= Samuel Wiselius =

Dutch lawyer and politician (1769–1845)

Samuel Iperuszoon Wiselius
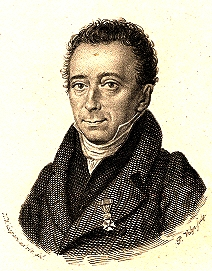
- Portrait by H. W. Caspari after being knighted in 1815

Committee on the East-Indies Trade and Possessions
- In office 1796–1801

Personal details
- Born: 4 February 1769 Amsterdam
- Died: 15 May 1845 Amsterdam
- Party: Patriotten
- Parent: Iperus Wiselius
- Education: Leiden University
- Occupation: Lawyer; writer; historian; police commissioner

Samuel Iperuszoon Wiselius (4 February 1769 – 15 May 1845) was a Dutch lawyer, politician, historian and poet. A prominent supporter of the Batavian Revolution, he advocated the establishment of a unitary state to replace the federal structure of the Dutch Republic. He participated in the revolution of 1795 and was subsequently involved in the dissolution of the Dutch East India Company (VOC) and the administration of Dutch colonial possessions. After the restoration of Dutch independence in 1813, he became head of the Amsterdam police, a position he held until 1840.

Wiselius maintained an extensive correspondence with leading political figures of the Batavian Republic, much of which is preserved in the Nationaal Archief. He also translated French comedies, and wrote plays influenced by classical literature.

== Biography ==
=== Early life ===
Uniform of Amsterdam's paid auxiliary soldiers (waardgelders), c. 1785.

Wiselius was born in Amsterdam, the only son of the merchant Iperus Wiselius. (Note: His father was a Patriot who had served as a lieutenant in the Amsterdam civic guard and was appointed colonel in May 1787. By late July, troops under his command were stationed in Utrecht. See Prussian invasion of Holland.) He grew up on the Nieuwezijds Kolk and received a classical education at the Athenaeum Illustre.

In 1786, Wiselius showed Theodorus van Kooten an early version of his historical and political treatise on the constitutional development of the Dutch Republic. Van Kooten retained the manuscript to examine it further and share it with other scholars. Following the political upheavals in September 1787, the manuscript remained out of Wiselius's hands until February 1793, when it was returned to him by Mr. F.L. Rambonnet, a lawyer in Kampen, with annotations by two readers. He subsequently revised the work extensively. (Note: In 1828, Wiselius explained that much of the original text had been written in 1786, but that the revisions justified dating the completed work to 1793.) Wiselius maintained his friendship with Van Kooten and Johan Valckenaer, who later became involved in the political events of 1795.

On 29 May 1787, Wiselius enrolled at Leiden University, where he studied law and attended lectures by David Ruhnken and Dionysius Godefridus van der Keessel. In 1789 Wiselius visited the University of Göttingen and travelled through Germany. On 6 November 1790, he obtained his doctorate in law at Leiden University.

During the orangist restoration following the Prussian intervention of 1787, Wiselius delivered three well-attended political lectures to the Amsterdam society Doctrina et Amicitia, in 1789, 1791 and 1793. He discussed self-defence, civil liberty, political equality and the relationship between different forms of government and public welfare. Wiselius became the society's librarian in 1792 and its secretary in 1794.

In his lectures, particularly in 1793, Wiselius rejected the Union of Utrecht as an adequate constitutional foundation for the Dutch Republic. Departing from the earlier Patriot programme of constitutional restoration, he advocated representative government and greater national unity, without ruling out a monarchical form of government. Influenced in part by the French Revolution, he argued for a fundamental reorganization of the state. His ideas anticipated the movement towards a unitary republic that culminated in the Batavian Constitution of 1798.

=== Batavian Republic ===
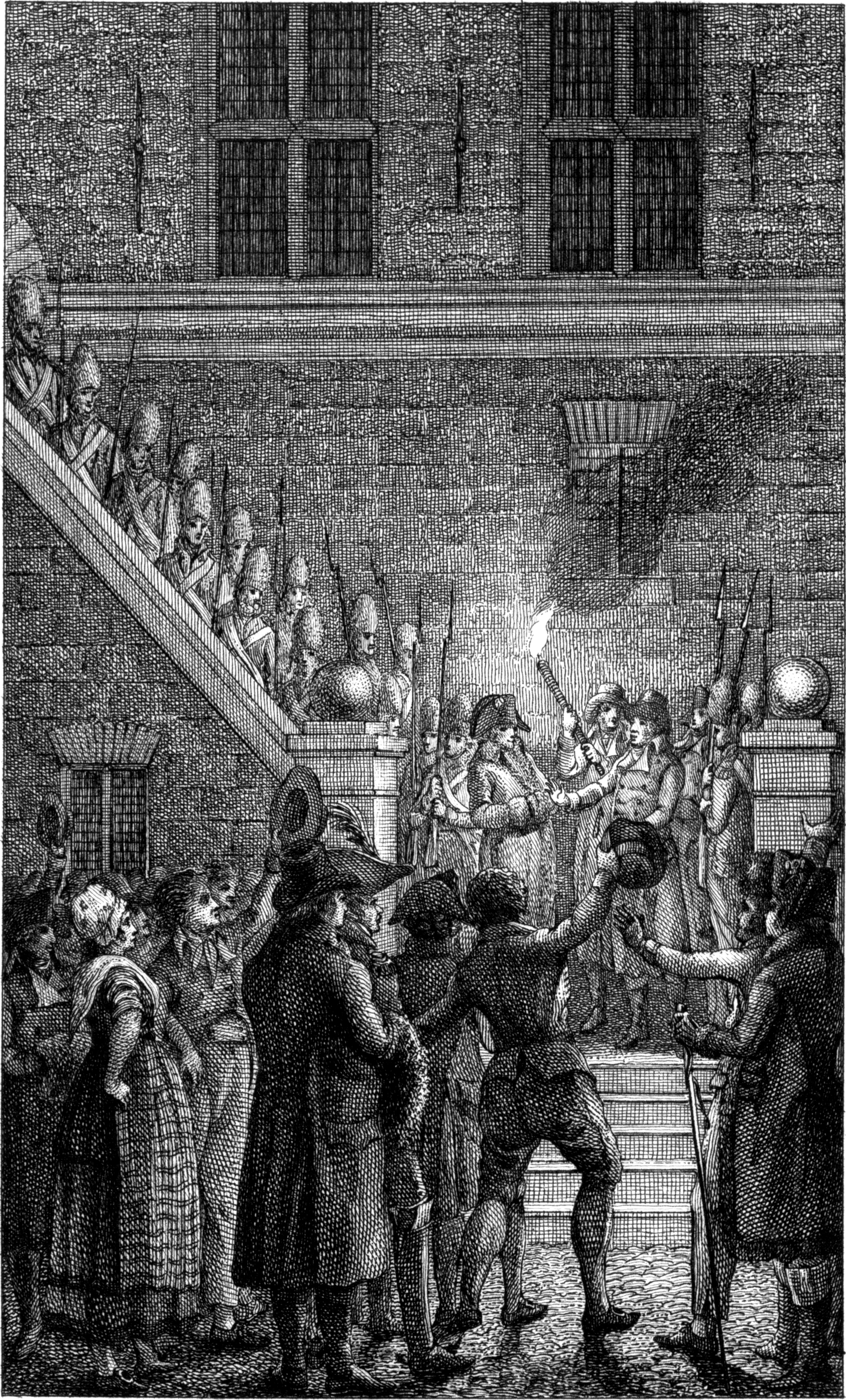
Beginning of the revolution in Amsterdam, 19 January 1795

=== Batavian Revolution (1794–1795) ===
In the autumn of 1794, as French troops advanced towards the Dutch Republic, Amsterdam Patriots prepared to overthrow the existing city government. Following the discovery of concealed weapons and the suppression of an earlier revolutionary initiative, a small group including Wiselius began planning a new uprising. Their aim was to replace the city magistrates with popular representatives without leaving Amsterdam without a functioning government. On 19 January 1795, the revolutionary committee took control of the town hall on Dam Square, removing the existing magistrates without bloodshed.

Following the Batavian Revolution, Wiselius became a member of the provisional representatives of Holland, serving as secretary in February 1795 and presiding over their meetings in July and November. He also participated in committees responsible for reorganizing the provincial administration. A committed advocate of a unitary state, he sought to replace the extensive autonomy of the provinces under the Union of Utrecht with a stronger central government, a position shared by Pieter Paulus and Alexander Gogel.

=== Political and colonial affairs (1796–1798) ===
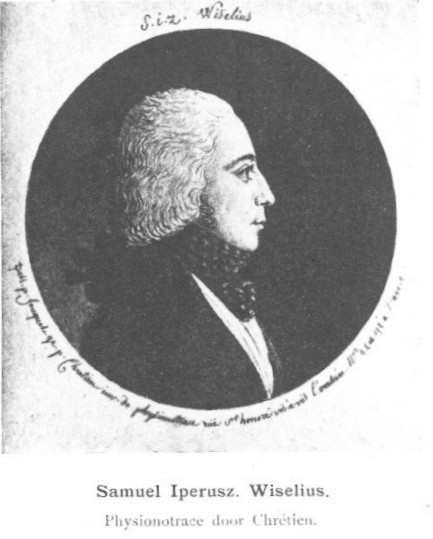
Physionotrace portrait of Wiselius, drawn by Pierre Fouquet and engraved by Gilles-Louis Chrétien in Paris, around 1798.

In 1796, Wiselius joined the Comité tot den Oost-Indischen Handel en Bezittingen, established to oversee the affairs of the Dutch East India Company (VOC) following the decision to dissolve it. According to historian René Koekkoek, Wiselius became the committee's leading figure. In December 1796, the committee submitted draft constitutional articles accompanied by a report written by Wiselius, proposing that the colonies should become inseparable parts of the "one and indivisible" Batavian Republic. The report extended the principle of equal rights and duties to the overseas territories, while allowing adjustments according to local circumstances and the common good. This conception of constitutional unity was subsequently rejected in favour of a colonial system in which overseas possessions remained subordinate to the state.

In 1797, Wiselius travelled to Middelburg to promote the Unitarist programme in Zeeland, where opposition to the loss of provincial sovereignty remained strong.

In July 1797, Wiselius and Von Liebeherr signed an agreement on behalf of the East India Committee to sell substantial quantities of colonial goods to the Copenhagen trading firm De Coninck, (Note: In September 1796 the cargo of six ships (in Norwegian ports), coming from China, Ceylon and Batavia, were sold to the Danish merchant De Coninck.) which undertook to collect the cargoes from Batavia.

In January 1798, Wiselius and several colleagues from the East India Committee held discussions in The Hague with Willem Ockerse and other radical unitarians. Initially concerned with constitutional and colonial affairs, the discussions took a different turn on 17 January, when they learned of plans by Wybo Fijnje and Ockerse to seize power by force. Wiselius strongly opposed proposals to confiscate the property of arrested representatives and warned against arbitrary violence. Unable to prevent the planned coup, he and his colleagues withdrew from the preparations. According to Simon Schama, Wiselius had not been aware of the conspiracy before these discussions.

In March 1798, Wiselius and Alexander Gogel opposed the growing influence of radical revolutionaries in Amsterdam. On 15 March, a commission appointed by the provincial administration of Holland dismissed the city's municipal government. Both men protested against the dismissal and the subsequent political purges, but their efforts had only limited success.

In April, Wiselius and Von Liebeherr were sent to Paris to negotiate with Talleyrand over the transport of goods from the Dutch East Indies under neutral Danish flags. The arrangement was intended to protect Dutch merchant ships from British interception, but also required assurances against seizure by French privateers. The negotiations encountered difficulties when the French authorities questioned the diplomatic status of the two envoys.

Suspecting Wiselius of involvement in a conspiracy, the Executive Authority recalled both men. Wiselius, Von Liebeherr and Quint Ondaatje were subsequently involved in opposition to the radical government of Pieter Vreede, which was overthrown on 12 June 1798.

=== Asian Council and dismissal (1800–1804) ===
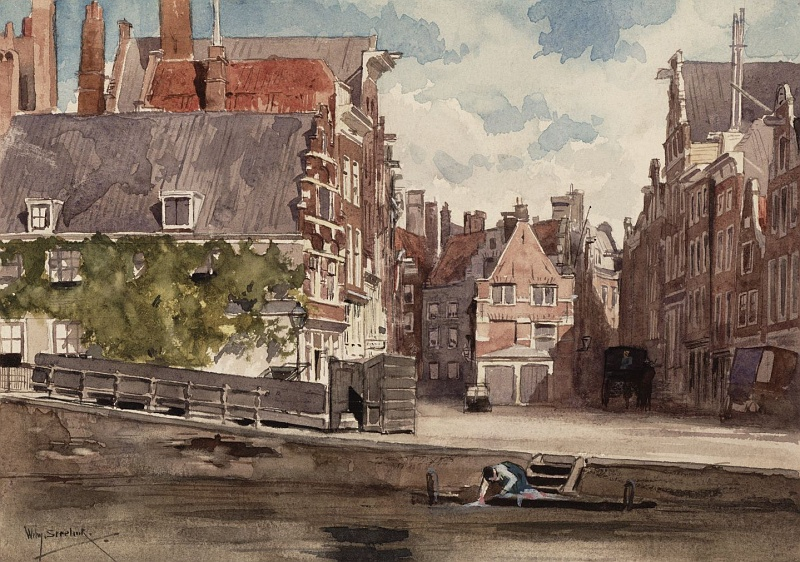
Willem Steelink jr, nl:Nieuwezijds Kolk, around 1880

In 1800, Wiselius continued his work in colonial administration as a member of the Council of Asian Possessions and Establishments (Raad der Aziatische Bezittingen en Etablissementen), established in late 1799 to succeed the East Indies Committee. The council resisted attempts by former Dutch East India Company officials to restore their administrative autonomy.

By March 1801, Wiselius had become critical of the representative system established under the Constitution of 1798. Although he remained committed to a unitary state, he advocated reducing the powers of the National Assembly and strengthening the executive.

Following the political changes of September 1801 and the establishment of the Staatsbewind, Wiselius retained his position on the council but opposed the government's reconciliation with former Orangists. In the summer of 1802, he complained to De Winter about the declining number of genuine Patriots in public office. According to Simon Schama, Wiselius also approached General Herman Willem Daendels about the possibility of another coup, similar to that of 22 January 1798. Daendels, however, declined to support the proposal.

In 1804, amid criticism of the council's financial administration, Wiselius was dismissed along with five other members. In his pamphlet Beroep op het Bataafsche Volk, he defended his conduct and challenged the accusations against the council. He regarded his dismissal as politically motivated and criticized the increasing influence of former Orangists. His removal ended his administrative career under the Batavian Republic.

=== Kingdom of Holland ===
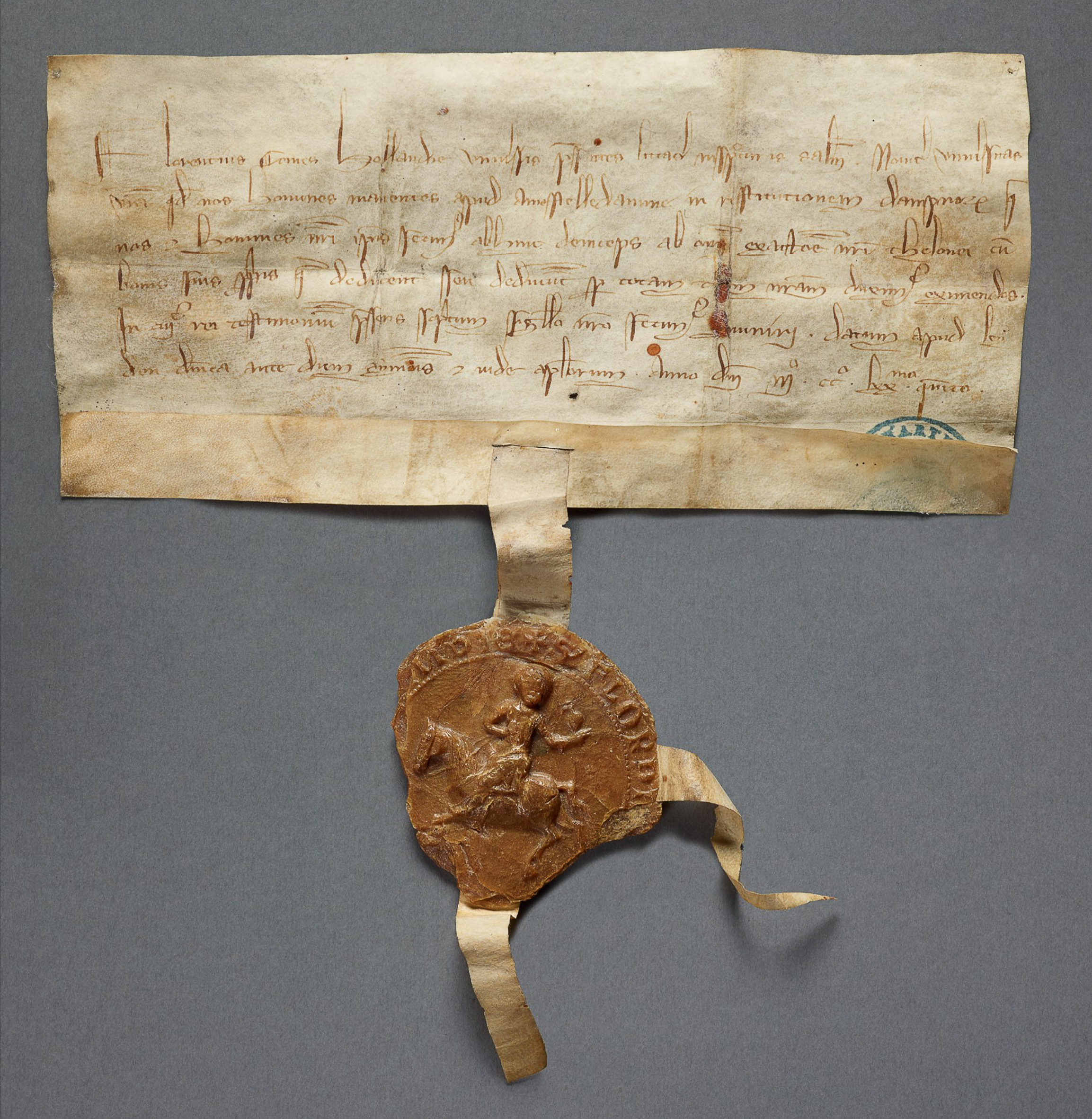
The toll privilege granted to Amsterdam by Floris V, Count of Holland, in 1275

The establishment of the Kingdom of Holland in 1806, with Louis Bonaparte as king, was unacceptable to Wiselius. He refused offers of public office, consistently referring to the new monarch as "Mr Louis Bonaparte" (den heer Lodewijk Bonaparte), thereby refusing to acknowledge his royal title. Having withdrawn from public administration in 1804, Wiselius continued his private commercial activities while devoting more time to history and literature.

In 1807, he moved to a small country residence near Sterrenbos, in Utrecht, until 1813, while maintaining his business address in Amsterdam. There he concentrated on gardening, classical history, poetry and drama, and sought literary advice from Willem Bilderdijk, despite their differing political views. His poem De Roem, which he recited privately, expressed his opposition to the new political order.

Wiselius also translated and annotated Jean-Baptiste Le Chevalier's account of his travels in the Troad. A contemporary review praised his independent translations of classical passages and extensive historical commentary. In 1810, he published Vertoog over de hooge oudheid van het letterschrift, challenging the theories of Christian Gottlob Heyne and Friedrich August Wolf concerning the origins of the Iliad and the Odyssey.

His early love poetry reflected his familiarity with classical Greek and Latin literature, particularly Anacreon, Theocritus and the Neo-Latin poet Janus Secundus.

In 1809, Wiselius defended the political legacy of the Patriots against criticism from the poet Jan Frederik Helmers. In his Brief en Dichtmatig Iets aan den Heere J.F. Helmers, Wiselius rejected these accusations and attributed the political disasters of the preceding decades to the aristocratic opponents of the Patriots. Despite the annexation of the Kingdom of Holland by France in 1810, he did not return to public office until the restoration of Dutch independence in 1813.

=== Kingdom of the Netherlands ===
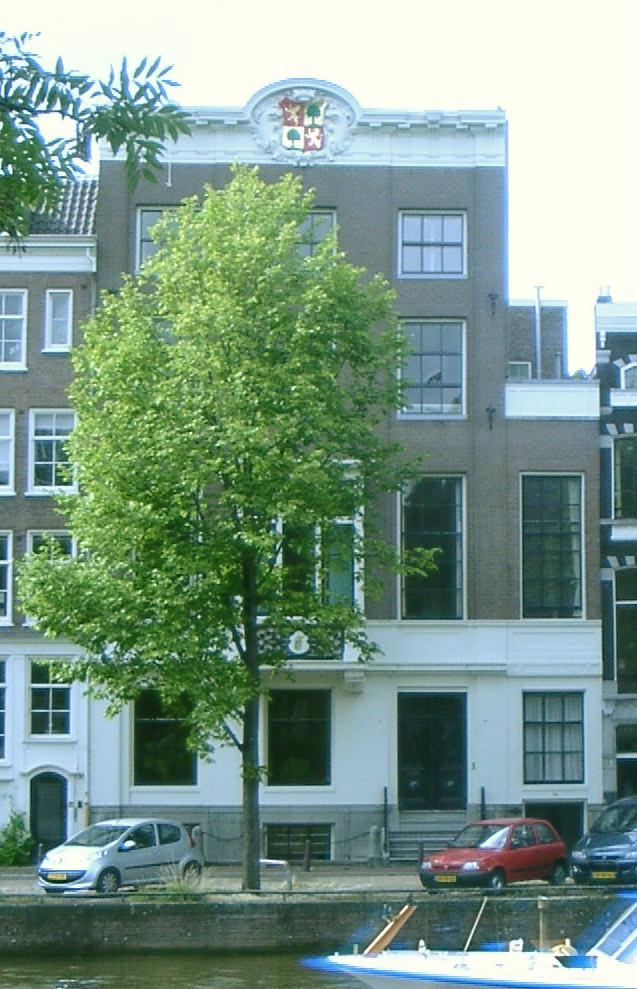
Nieuwe Herengracht 99

Following the restoration of Dutch independence in 1813, Wiselius returned to public service under William I. On 29 December 1813, he was appointed chief director of the Amsterdam police. He declined an offer to become governor-general of the Dutch East Indies, preferring to remain in the Netherlands with his ten children, following his wife's death in August 1813, and his elderly mother.

Historian Johan Joor, following C.H.E. de Wit, argued that the establishment of the modern constitutional unitary state in 1813 owed less to Gijsbert Karel van Hogendorp's political programme than to several other factors. These included the efforts of Joan Melchior Kemper, Anton Reinhard Falck, and former Amsterdam democrats Wiselius and Johan Valckenaer to give the revolution a national direction, the failure of the former regents to rally behind Van Hogendorp, the future William I's unwillingness to restore the pre-1795 political order, and the geopolitical interests of the Allied powers, particularly Britain.

In 1815, Wiselius became a member of the Royal Institute of Sciences, Literature and Fine Arts, located at Trippenhuis. He succeeded Willem Bilderdijk as secretary of its literary division in late 1816 and was formally appointed permanent secretary in 1817. In this capacity, he corresponded with scholars including Jacob Grimm.

Wiselius also contributed to the preservation and publication of historical documents. In 1821, he participated in the publication of early Amsterdam charters, including the toll privilege granted by Floris V, Count of Holland, in 1275. The commission included Cornelis Felix van Maanen, Jeronimo de Vries and P.A. Brugmans.

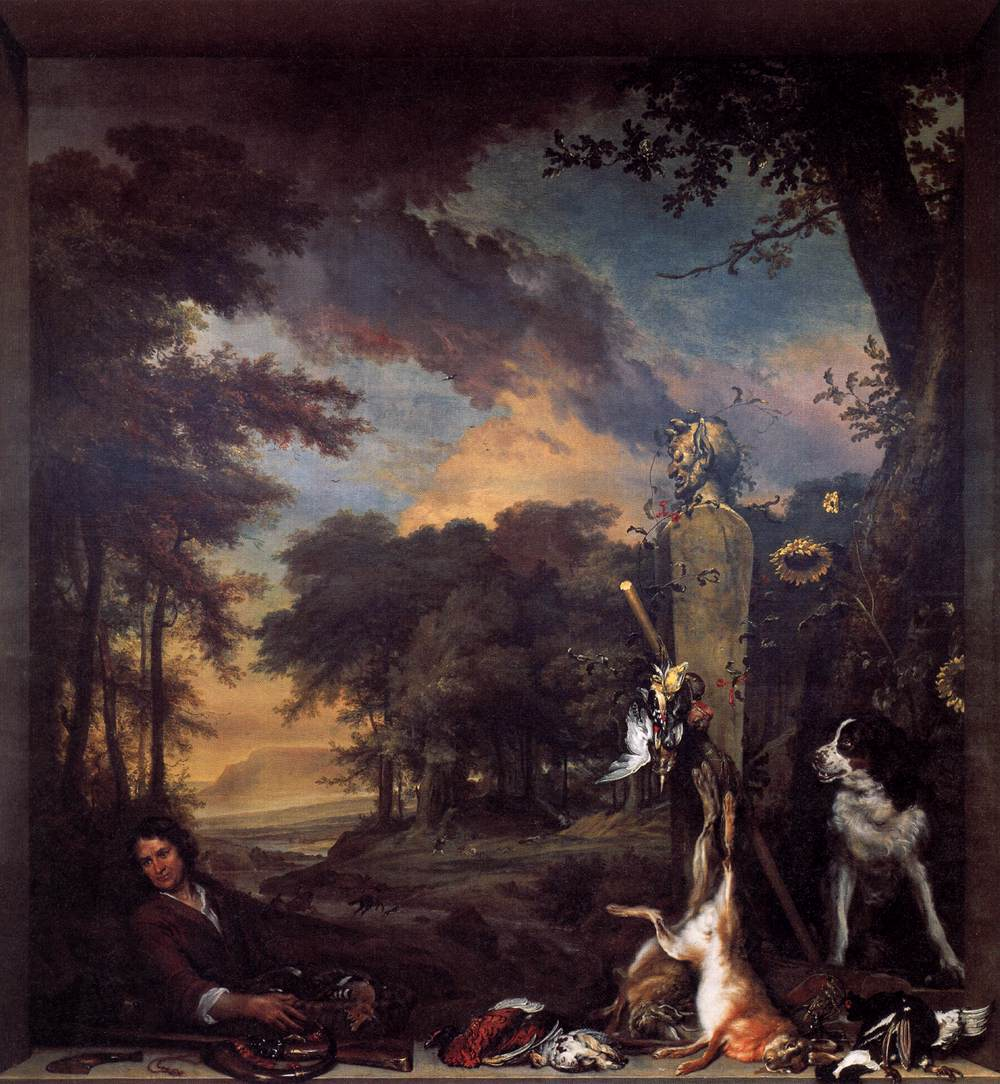
Landscape with a Huntsman and Dead Game (Allegory of the Sense of Smell) by Jan Weenix, formerly at Nieuwe Herengracht 99. National Galleries of Scotland.

In August 1824, Wiselius received a visit from Gustav IV Adolf of Sweden, the deposed king of Sweden, at his rented residence at Nieuwe Herengracht in Amsterdam. Gustav came to admire the five monumental paintings by Jan Weenix that formed part of the house's original interior decoration. Commissioned around 1697–1698 by Jacob Henriques de Granada, the paintings represented the five senses through elaborate hunting scenes, still lifes and allegorical compositions. They were installed as architectural wall panels in the principal reception room overlooking the Plantage, and remained there for more than two centuries. (Note: Following the sale of the house in 1922, the paintings were acquired by the American newspaper publisher William Randolph Hearst and subsequently dispersed. Two are in the Carlyle Hotel in New York, one in the National Galleries of Scotland in Edinburgh, and another in the Allen Memorial Art Museum in Oberlin, Ohio. The whereabouts of the fifth painting remain unknown. Their history has been documented by art historian Anke van Wagenberg-Ter Hoeven in her catalogue raisonné of the paintings of Jan Baptist and Jan Weenix.)

In 1825, he joined a committee of the Royal Institute opposing the proposed demolition of Muiderslot, the medieval castle associated with the poet and historian P. C. Hooft. The committee advocated preserving the building and converting it into a national historical museum. Although the castle was saved, the museum plans were not implemented at the time.

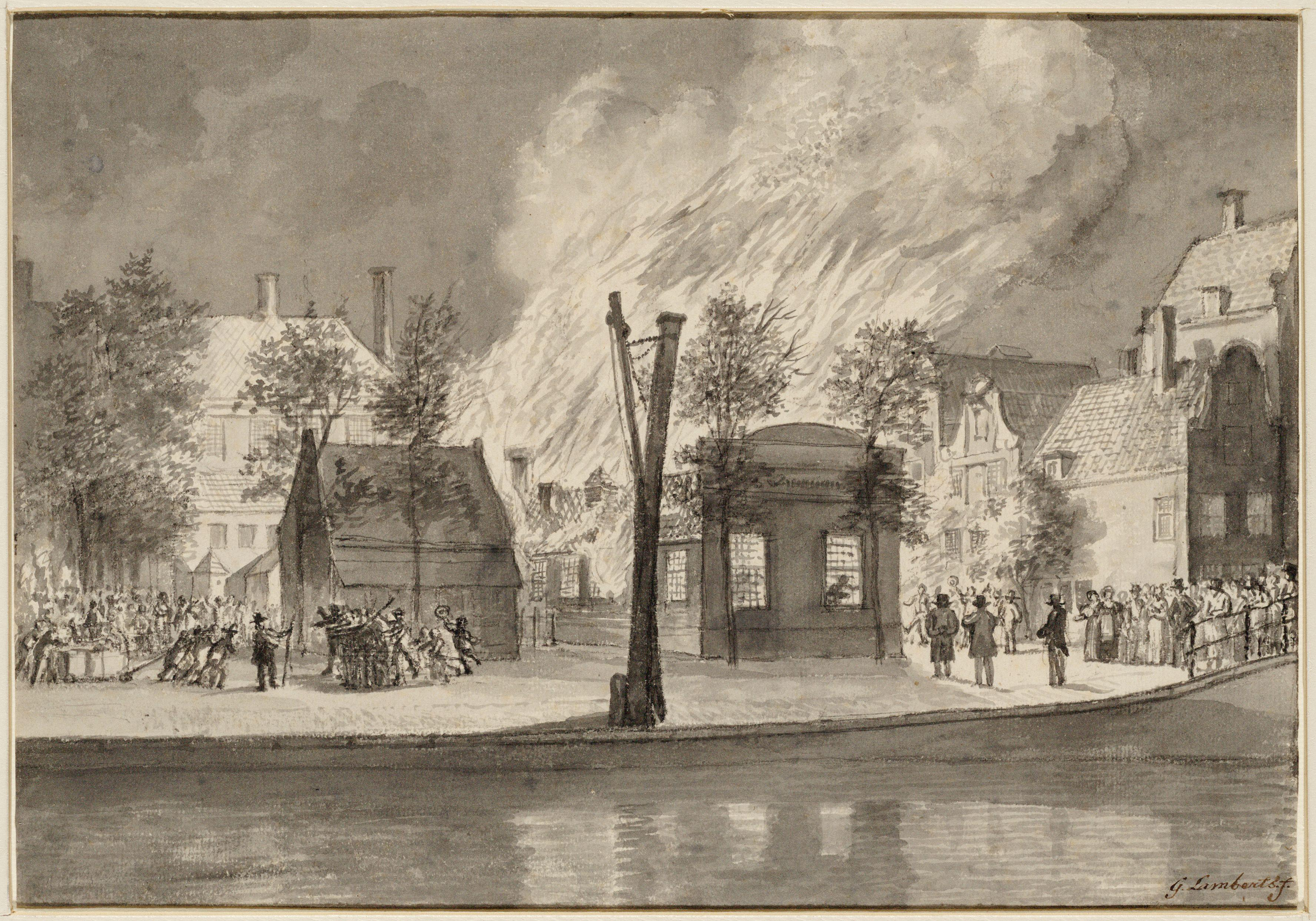
The soeploodsoproer on Herenmarkt in Amsterdam, July 1835

In July 1835, Wiselius faced criticism for the handling of the "Soeploodsoproer", a series of disturbances in Amsterdam organized by property owners protesting changes in the collection of property taxes. On 3 July, rioters set fire to a warehouse, and the authorities struggled to restore order. The response of the police and the city administration was widely criticized. Wiselius had delegated responsibility for policing the disturbances to a commissioner rather than personally directing the operation at the scene.

Wiselius retired from the police in 1840 but continued his literary and scholarly activities. He died in Amsterdam on 15 May 1845.

== Literary views ==
Le Théatre Hollandais by Cornelis de Kruyff (1825)

In 1797, Wiselius published a Dutch translation of the French comedy La Jeunesse du duc de Richelieu, ou Le Lovelace français (1796), by Alexandre Duval and Jacques-Marie Boutet de Monvel. (Note: The play by Duval was performed at the Amsterdam Schouwburg from December 1798 to at least March 1803.) His translation of Jean-Nicolas Bouilly's comedy L'Abbé de l'Épée was performed more than 50 times between 1800 and 1870.

Wiselius was also active as a theatre critic and theorist. A former commissioner of the Amsterdam theatre, he contributed to De tooneelkijker (1815–1819), a periodical devoted to improving Dutch theatrical standards. In his prose drama Walwais en Adelheid, he attempted to accommodate contemporary tastes while gradually encouraging audiences to appreciate classical dramatic conventions. Although critical of William Shakespeare, Friedrich Schiller and the popular German dramatists August von Kotzebue and August Wilhelm Iffland, he acknowledged certain merits in their works. Rather than advocating a strict return to French classicism, Wiselius sought a middle course between Greek tragedy and French classical drama, adapted to the tastes and expectations of contemporary audiences.

Wiselius's criticism reflected the conflict between French classicism and the growing influence of German Romanticism on Dutch literature#19th century. In 1834, Laurent van den Bergh responded to such criticism by publishing an anthology of translated scenes from sixteen Shakespeare plays, drawing on the interpretations of Goethe, Herder and August Wilhelm Schlegel.

== Reception ==
The former Police headquarters in the snow

Shortly after Wiselius's death, his son-in-law, the physician and writer Petrus van Limburg Brouwer, published a biography in 1846. The statesman Johan Rudolf Thorbecke reviewed the work that same year in an essay later included in his Historische schetsen (1860). Comparing Wiselius with Rutger Jan Schimmelpenninck, Thorbecke argued that the two men had different approaches to the revolution. Whereas Schimmelpenninck favoured compromise and reconciliation, Wiselius regarded the revolution as a matter of principle and resisted attempts to bring it to an early conclusion. Thorbecke nevertheless considered both men better suited to administration than legislation. He praised Van Limburg Brouwer's biography for illuminating several historical events, but criticized the author's repeated attempts to demonstrate that Wiselius had remained consistent in his political convictions.

In Patriots and Liberators (1977), historian Simon Schama offered a more critical assessment, portraying Wiselius as a relatively minor figure whose political radicalism and unwillingness to compromise contributed to his disillusionment with the Batavian Republic. Schama also characterised Wiselius and Johan Valckenaer as intellectuals rather than politicians who, despite their republican convictions, shared a patrician distaste for the conflicts and rivalries of political life.

Later historians have placed greater emphasis on Wiselius's contribution to the development of revolutionary political thought. N.C.F. van Sas identified his lectures of 1793 as an important departure from the traditional Patriot programme of constitutional restoration towards the establishment of a unitary state. René Koekkoek has similarly situated Wiselius among the intellectual figures involved in reformulating the Patriot political agenda in the early 1790s, particularly in debates about democratic government and citizenship.

== Sources ==
- This article is based partially on its equivalent on Dutch Wikipedia.
