= Rutger Jan Schimmelpenninck =

Dutch jurist, ambassador and politician

Rutger Jan Schimmelpenninck Count Schimmelpenninck
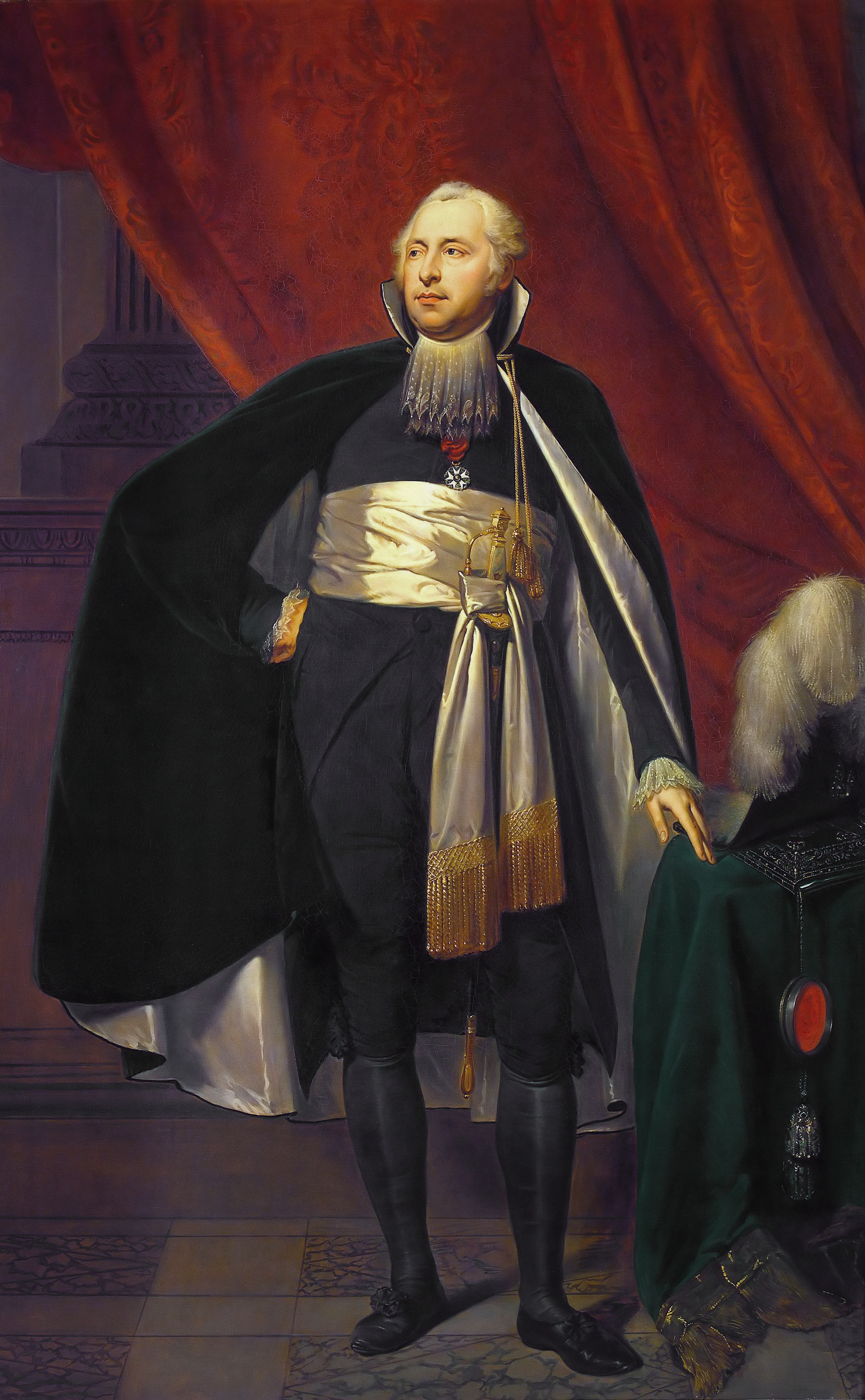
- Portrait by Charles Howard Hodges, 1806

Grand Pensionary of the Batavian Republic
- In office 29 April 1805 – 4 June 1806
- Preceded by: Staatsbewind
- Succeeded by: Carel de Vos van Steenwijk

Personal details
- Born: 31 October 1761 Deventer, Overijssel, Dutch Republic
- Died: 15 February 1825 (aged 63) Amsterdam, United Kingdom of the Netherlands
- Spouse: Catharina Nahuys
- Education: Leiden University

Rutger Jan, Count Schimmelpenninck (31 October 1761 – 15 February 1825), Lord of Nyenhuis, Peckedam and Gellicum, was a Dutch jurist, ambassador and politician who served as Grand Pensionary of the Batavian Republic from 1805 to 1806. Historian Niek Sas called him the first Dutch liberal politician.

== Education ==
Schimmelpenninck was born into a bastard branch of the noble family Schimmelpenninck van der Oye in Deventer, Overijssel on 31 October 1761. His father, Gerrit Schimmelpenninck, was a wine trader who had no rights in the Dutch Republic because of his commitment to the Mennonite Church. Schimmelpenninck attended Athenaeum Illustre of Deventer, and started studying Roman and Contemporary Law at Leiden University in 1781. He received his doctorate in 1784 with his essay De imperio populari rite temporato, in which he defended Rousseau's doctrine of popular sovereignty, although this is limited to the wealthy bourgeoisie. He also spoke positively of the Constitution of the United States with its dominating president in this thesis. The wealthy bourgeoisie, to which Schimmelpenninck belonged, was devoid of any power, particularly in the east of the Netherlands. This frustrated him and others who enjoyed a good education but weren't assigned influential positions in government because of their background and religion, since these were reserved to scions from the nobility and patricians, and limited to followers of the Reformed Church in the eastern provinces. He was one of the first Patriots as a student in Leiden. As the leader of an exercitiegenootschap, he suppressed an insurrection of Orangist students in June 1784. In October 1785 he was appointed by a congress of representatives of Holland exercitiegenootschappen in a commission, together with Wybo Fijnje and Pieter Vreede, to write the Patriot manifesto, known as the Leiden Draft.

After receiving his doctorate, on 11 December 1784, Schimmelpenninck left for Amsterdam to become a lawyer. In 1788, he married Catharina Nahuys, a scion of a wealthy family who provided him with a lot of money and the necessary connections in the capital. Together with these connections, he established the Patriotic Vaderlandsche Sociëteit. The society was short-lived; it was disbanded in 1787 due to Prussian intervention. The Prussians restored the power of the stadtholder, William V, and his Prussian consort Wilhelmina. The Patriots were thwarted since, and a portion fled to France. Schimmelpenninck and his friends decided to establish a "scientific" society, the Kunst- en letterlievend Genootschap Doctrina et Amicitia, which included several other prominent Patriots, including Cornelis Rudolphus Theodorus Krayenhoff, Alexander Gogel, Samuel Iperusz. Wiselius and Nicolaas van Staphorst. In 1792, Schimmelpenninck, together with the Van Staphorst brothers, participated in the Holland Land Company, a company investing in northern New York.

== Early career ==
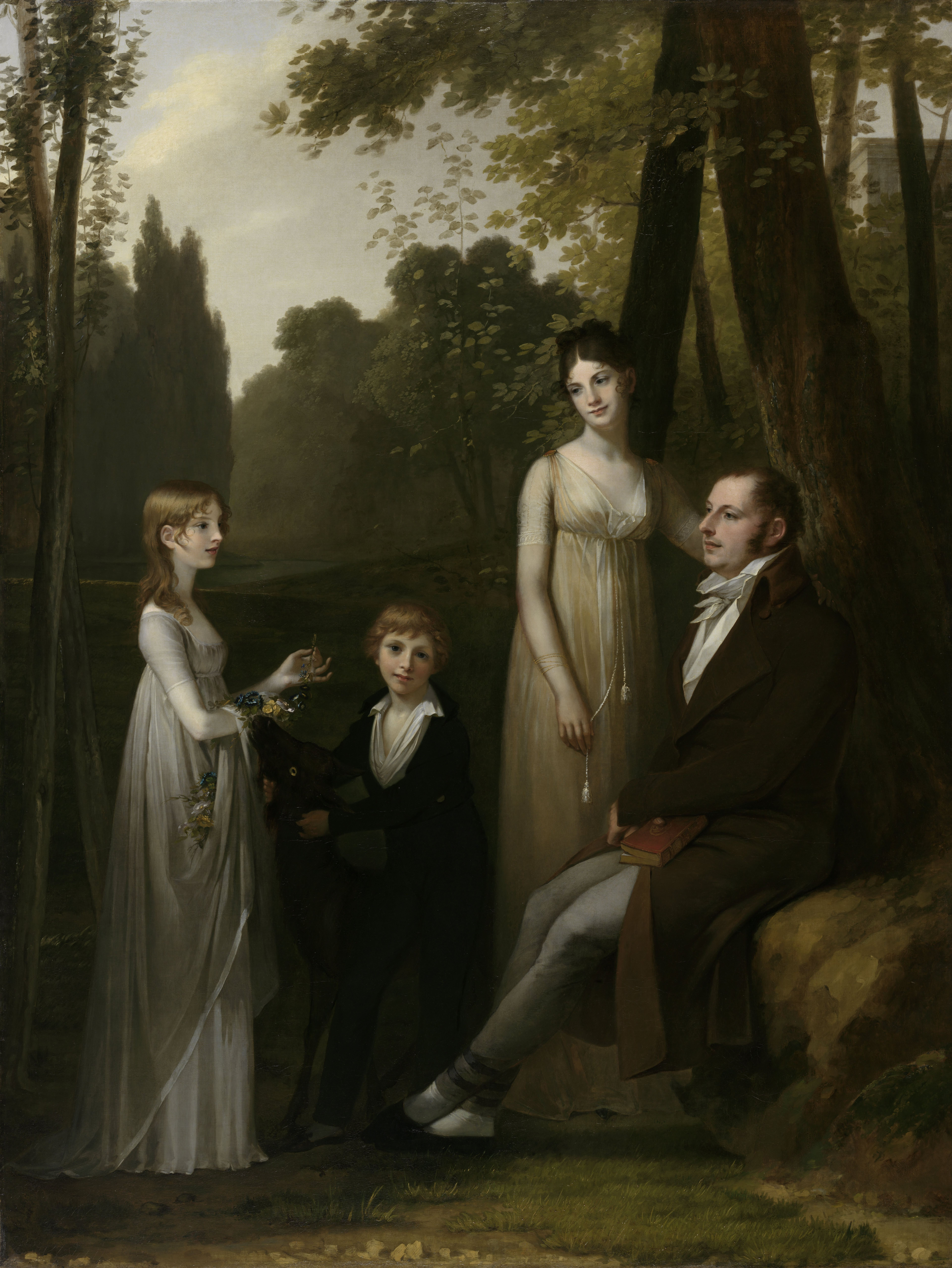
Schimmelpenninck with his wife and children ca. 1802

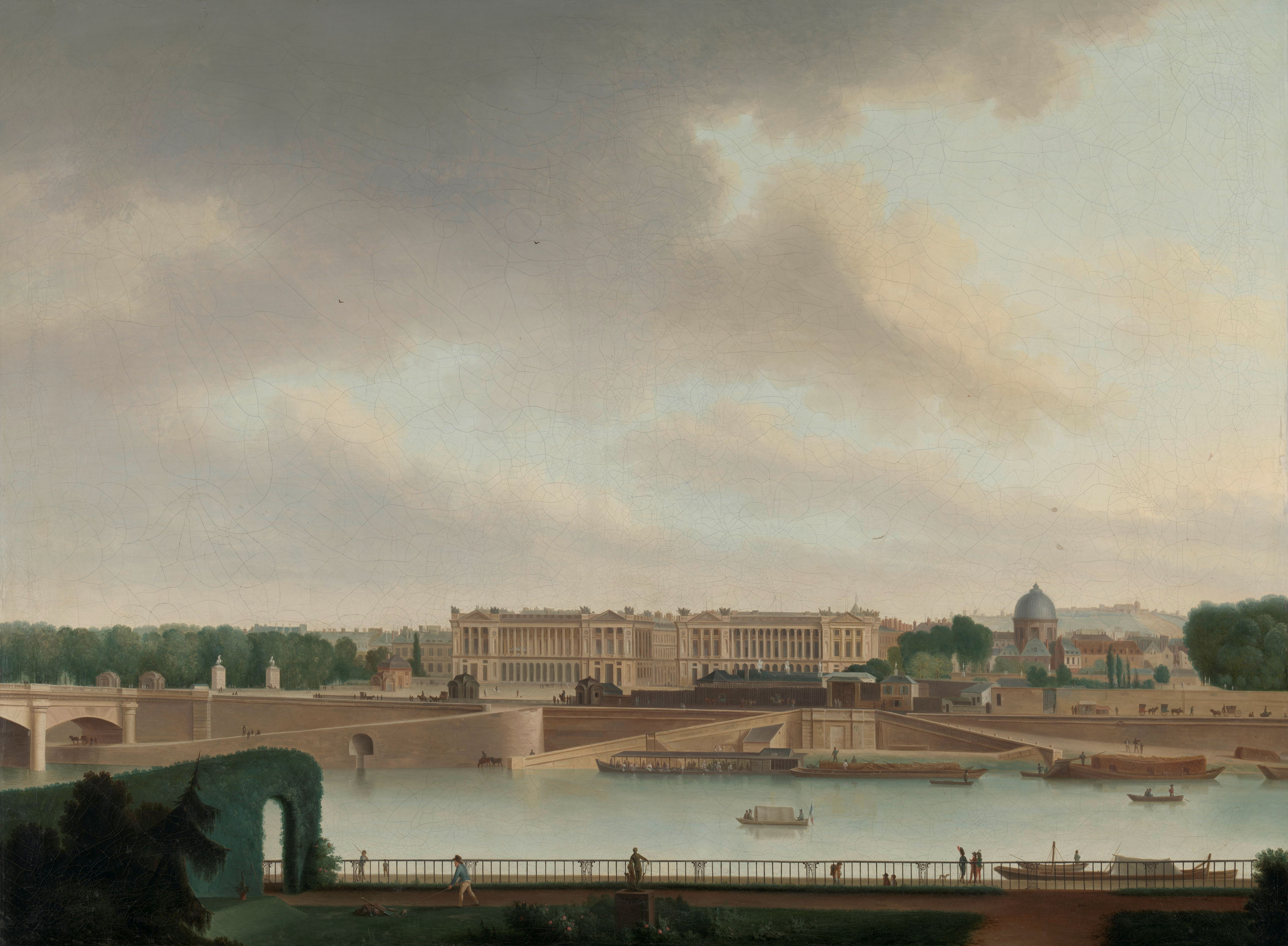
The view from the Batavian embassy, the Hôtel Beauharnais, in Paris on the Place de la Concorde at the time of Rutger Jan Schimmelpenninck's ambassadorship.

After the French invasion in the Batavian Revolution on 19 January 1795, Schimmelpenninck ended up in the temporary city government of Amsterdam. On 1 March 1796, he was elected into the 1st National Assembly for the electoral district Amsterdam-XIV. He seated with the Moderates, who opposed the Federalists and the Unitarians. The Federalists were conservative; they were satisfied with the departure of the stadtholder but opposed further reforms. They were proponents of provincial autonomy. The Unitarians, however, were radical, and wished to replace the provinces with departments and establish a powerful, democratic and centralised government for the Batavian Republic. Schimmelpenninck's Moderates took a central stance. They also wanted a centralised government like the Unitarians, but had no desire for profound broadening of electoral law. Schimmelpenninck presided the National Assembly from 17 May to 30 May 1796, and again from 15 May to 29 May 1797. In 1797, he was re-elected into the 2nd National Assembly, but immediately resigned when rumours spread that the "ultrademocrats" attempted to seize control with the aid of France. After the coup d'état of Herman Willem Daendels on 12 June 1798, Schimmelpenninck returned to the foreground. Although Daendels was an irascible Unitarian, he followed the line of "cautious tempering" and was supported by Schimmelpenninck.

On 14 June 1798, Schimmelpenninck was appointed Batavian ambassador to Paris. After Napoleon's coup d'état on 9 November 1799, Schimmelpenninck became captivated with his personality. In 1801 and 1802 he took part in the negotiations preceding the Treaty of Amiens. He saw himself as an independent negotiator between the French and British plenipotentiaries, Napoleon's brother Joseph Bonaparte and Charles Cornwallis, 1st Marquess Cornwallis respectively. In practice, the Batavian Republic had no independent foreign politics anymore, and had to comply to the wishes of France. On 8 December 1802, Schimmelpenninck was transferred to London, but he returned half a year later, on 14 June 1803, at the request of France. The war between Great Britain and France and its allies, including the Batavian Republic which had endured another coup d'était in 1801, continued. He returned to his office as ambassador to France on 15 September 1803, where he was noticed by Napoleon.

== Grand Pensionary ==
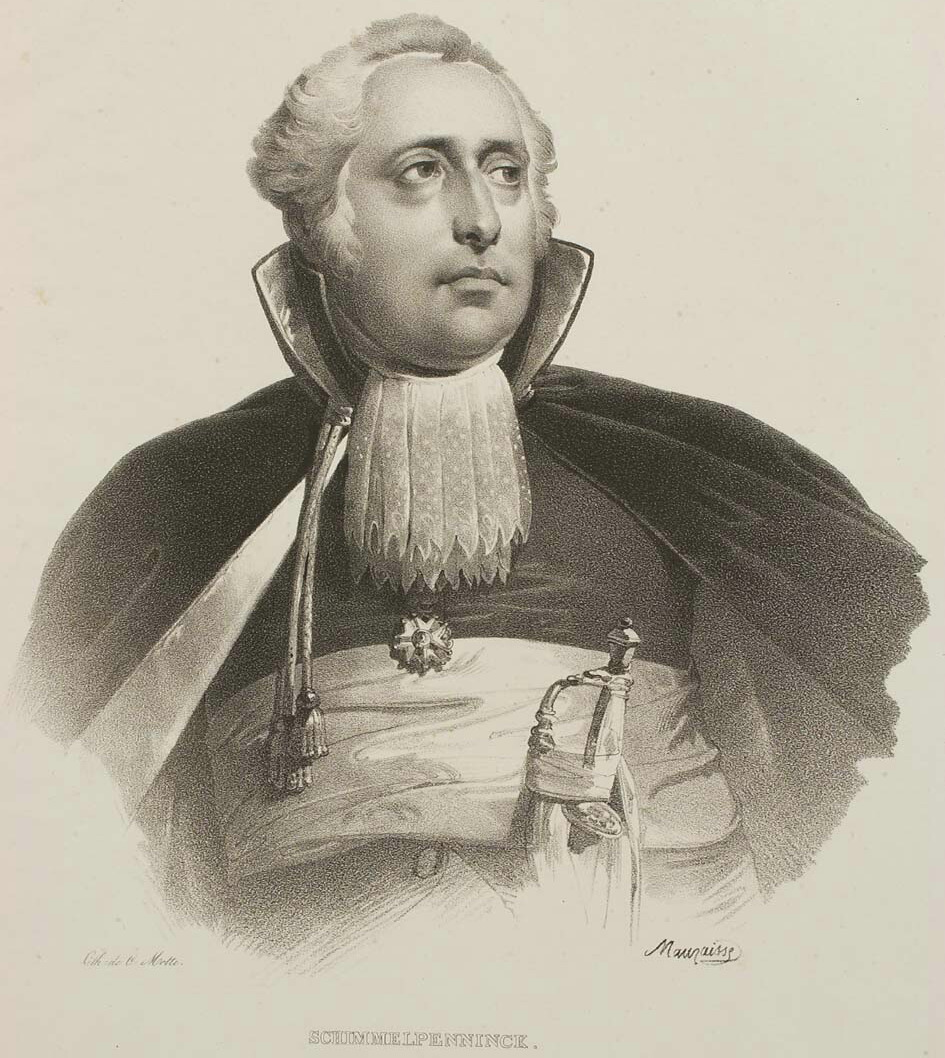
Schimmelpenninck as Grand Pensionary of the Batavian Republic in 1805–1806

In 1804, Schimmelpenninck was asked to write a new constitution for the Batavian Republic by Napoleon. When he finished this constitution a year later, he returned to the Netherlands to assume power from the Uitvoerend Bewind, being appointed Grand Pensionary of the Batavian Republic of the Batavian Republic on 29 April 1805. It is not clear whether he felt much desire to hold this office, but since Napoleon more or less forced him to, he accepted. Although on paper he was the republic's chief executive, in practice he had become a puppet to Napoleon. As Grand Pensionary, he was assisted by a legislative body of nineteen men which would assemble every six months to express its opinion on the policy. A kind of cabinet of secretaries of state was introduced. One of the most important secretaries of state was Alexander Gogel, who managed the department of Finance. In the short period of time in which Schimmelpenninck was Grand Pensionary he, assisted by Gogel, implemented several major reforms. Gogel managed to implement a new tax system. Excise on salt, soap, peat, alcoholic beverages, grain, flour and meat was introduced, as well as land tax, a cadastre, personal tax on clerks, horses, furniture, etc. Schimmelpenninck's secretary of Education, Hendrik van Stralen, implemented a new education act introducing subsidised public education. On 4 June 1806, Schimmelpenninck was replaced by Napoleon's brother Louis Bonaparte, who would be crowned king of the newly formed French puppet state, the Kingdom of Holland.

Schimmelpenninck was introduced into the French nobility in 1807. He was further elevated to Comte de l'Empire, i.e. "Count", by Napoleon himself on 10 April 1811. After his resignation as Grand Pensionary, he was unemployed for five years, until he became senator in the Sénat conservateur of France on 30 December 1811. The Netherlands had since been annexed by France. When Napoleon was defeated and the United Kingdom of the Netherlands was established in 1815, Schimmelpenninck took up a seat in the First Chamber of the States General on 21 September 1815. Due to an eye disease, he was forced to give up his seat in 1820, and retreat from the public eye. He died in Amsterdam on 15 February 1825.

== Honours ==
- Netherlands: Grand Cross of the Order of the Union (16 February 1807)
- France: Grand Cross of the Order of the Reunion (22 February 1812)
- France: Grand Eagle of the Legion of Honour (8 November 1813)

== Sources ==
- Historical Dictionary of the Netherlands
- Schimmelpenninck 1761-1825 (in Dutch)

Political offices
Preceded by Staatsbewind	Grand Pensionary of Batavia; 1805–1806	Succeeded by Carel de Vos van Steenwijk
