= Political history of the Netherlands =

National political history

The political history of the Netherlands covers the history of political movements and systems of government in the nation of the Netherlands, from the earliest stages of the history of the Netherlands until the present day.

The start of Dutch democracy was marked by the 1781 pamphlet Aan het Volk van Nederland (To the people of the Netherlands). The democratisation process unfolded in three phases: the creation of a sovereign state with a constitution and parliament (1780–1830), the formation of a parliamentary system (1848–1868), and the expansion of voting rights to the entire adult population (1887–1919).

== Early history ==
Early forms of government in the current territory of the Netherlands included water boards in the Middle Ages, which were necessitated because of common flooding. The area became part of the Holy Roman Empire, and it was divided into provinces, ruled by counts and dukes. When it came under power of the dukes of Burgundy in the 15th century, the provinces continued to exercise a significant degree of self-government. The Burgundian Netherlands transitioned into the Habsburg Netherlands, and its ruler, though more occupied with ruling other territories, bore the title Lord of the Netherlands. The Dutch parliament, the States General, first convened in 1464, but it had limited authority under the king's rule.

Opposed to King Philip II's consolidation of power and limiting of religious freedoms for Protestants, Dutch political elites attempted to halt these changes through petitions. A violent revolt ensued when their demands were not met, leading to the start of the Eighty Years' War in 1568. The Dutch rebellion was led by William the Silent, the stadtholder (king's deputy) of several provinces. The States General approved the Act of Abjuration in 1581, declaring that the Netherlands was no longer subjugated to the rule of Phillip II due to his tyrannical behaviour.

== Dutch Republic ==
The Dutch Republic was founded in 1588 as a confederation of seven provinces. The States General became the highest political body in the new state, while the provinces maintained much of their autonomy. The Dutch Republic was an oligarchy, where the countryside was administered by the nobility and the cities were run by regenten from prominent families. The provinces became responsible for appointing their stadtholder, who had several roles including commander-in-chief of the armed forces. William the Silent stayed on in his position. After his assassination in 1584, he was succeeded as stadtholder by his son, Maurice of Orange, in many provinces, establishing the tradition of the Prince of Orange holding the role. Other influential roles included the Land's Advocate of Holland (later grand pensionary). In that position, Johan van Oldenbarnevelt clashed with Maurice of Orange about the Twelve Years' Truce (1609–1621) and provincial autonomy. As a result of their disagreements, Van Oldenbarnevelt was sentenced to death in 1619 for high treason.

In 1648, the Eighty Year's War came to an end with the Peace of Münster, which turned the Dutch Republic into an internationally recognised state. The death of William II three years later gave rise to the First Stadtholderless Period, during which the power of the regenten increased and Grand Pensionary Johan de Witt became an important national figure. In the Disaster Year 1672, William III was appointed stadtholder after the lynching of De Witt and his brother, restoring the office to the House of Orange-Nassau. William III died without offspring, leading to the Second Stadtholderless Period from 1702 until 1747. The title of Prince of Orange was transferred to the descendants of William the Silent's brother, Johann VI. In 1747, when France invaded the Dutch Republic as part of the War of the Austrian Succession, William IV was made stadtholder in what became known as the Orangist Revolution. The Dutch Republic started to adopt a monarchical character, with the stadtholder assuming a king-like role.

=== Patriot Revolt ===
Influenced by the Age of Enlightenment, associations were established in the Dutch Republic where government was discussed starting in the 1750s, and new ideas appeared in pamphlets and periodicals. The country was considered in decline after the Dutch Golden Age, which some blamed on decadence and lust of power by the stadtholder and ruling elite. Support existed in the Dutch Republic for the American Revolution, causing Great Britain to declare the Fourth Anglo-Dutch War. The Netherlands was severely affected by a British sea blockade. An anonymous 1781 pamphlet by Joan Derk van der Capellen tot den Pol called Aan het Volk van Nederland (To the people of the Netherlands) blamed the country's problems on the tyrannical rule of William V. It called for a revolt and argued that sovereignty over the country belonged to its citizenry. Special militias were formed in opposition to the stadtholder by so-called Patriots, and they demanded in 1785 that city administrations should be chosen by citizens. A large number of cities came under control of the Patriots until the Prussian king supported William V with a military force in 1787.

== French period ==
After the French Revolution, the Patriots received support from the French army, who helped end the rule of the stadtholders in 1795. The Batavian Republic was established, and the States General were replaced by an elected National Assembly. Disagreements existed within the Patriots about the extent of suffrage and about whether the Netherlands should keep its federal government or copy of the unitary government of the French First Republic. A compromised constitution drafted by the assembly was rejected in a referendum, and a coup d'état by the supporters of a unitary state was supported by the French army because of the result and prolonged debates. The first constitution of the Netherlands went into effect in 1798 after federalist politicians had been removed from office, increasing the national government's power along with enshrining civil rights and equality between citizens. The Batavian Republic started to lose its relative independence and democracy when Napoleon came to power in 1799, and it was replaced by the Kingdom of Holland, led by Napoleon's brother Louis Bonaparte, in 1806. The Territory became part of the First French Empire in 1810, and French rule ended three years later.
