= Helmers =

Helmers is a surname. Notable people with the surname include:

- Jan Frederik Helmers (1767–1813), Dutch poet
- Knut Jøran Helmers (1957–2021), Norwegian chess player
- Matthew Helmers, American engineer
