= Uitvoerend Bewind =

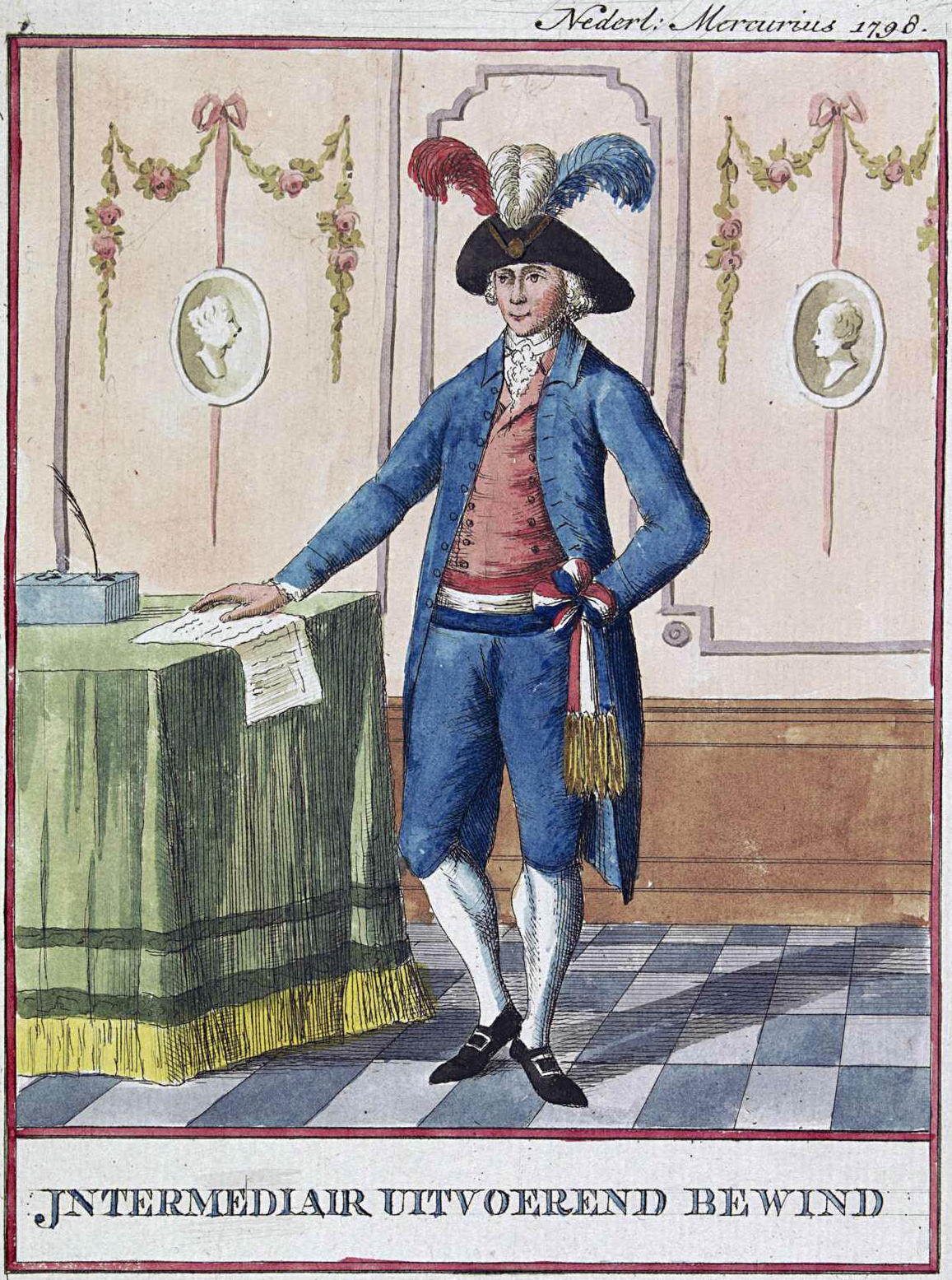
- Official costume of a member of the Uitvoerend Bewind of the Batavian Republic (1798)

Overview
- Established: 1798
- Dissolved: 1801
- Country: Batavian Republic

The Uitvoerend Bewind (Dutch for Executive Council/Authority) was the name of the government of the Batavian Republic between 1798 and 1801. The president of the Uitvoerend Bewind was head of state of the Batavian Republic.

== Unitarian Democrats ==
Following the French Revolution, the Patriots brought an end to the rule of stadtholder William V with support from the French army. They proclaimed the Batavian Republic, and founded the National Assembly to draft a constitution. Its members disagreed about the extent of suffrage and about whether to organise the republic as a federal or unitary state. The Patriots had originally supported a federal state with autonomy for the provinces, but some wanted to emulate the unitary model of the French First Republic with a strong central government. A compromised constitution was rejected by the electorate in August 1797.

The political group of unitarian democrats was dissatisfied with the prolonged debates, caused by the opposition to their ideas of the conservatives and moderates. Under the leadership of Pieter Vreede, the unitarian democrats engineered a coup d'état on 22 January 1798, with the help of general Herman Willem Daendels. National Assembly members favouring a unitary state were escorted to the chamber by the military, and they appointed the five-member executive Uitvoerend Bewind. This is considered to be the first Dutch government. It soon became highly unpopular among their own supporters in the country.

== Second Uitvoerend Bewind ==
A second coup followed on 12 June 1798, with the goal of removing the impopular rule. An interim government (the Intermediary Uitvoerend Bewind) was installed, which would reign until new elections would bring a new Representative Assembly, still under universal suffrage (This was replaced by census suffrage after the coup d'état of 1801). After the elections, a new Uitvoerend Bewind (also called the Constitutional Uitvoerend Bewind) was installed.

Between 1798 and 1801, the president of the Uitvoerend Bewind was the head of state of the Batavian Republic, and not as previously, the president of the Assembly. On 6 October 1801, the 1801 Batavian Republic constitutional referendum was held.

== Members ==
=== Provisional ===
Name	Membership term		President term		Ref.
Name	Begin date	End date	Begin date	End date	Ref.
Wybo Fijnje	23 January 1798	12 June 1798	25 February 1798	24 March 1798	
Johan Pieter Fokker	24 January 1798	12 June 1798	25 May 1798	12 June 1798	
Stefanus Jacobus van Langen	23 January 1798	12 June 1798	25 March 1798	24 April 1798	
Pieter Vreede	23 January 1798	12 June 1798	25 January 1798	24 February 1798	
Berend Wildrik	23 January 1798	12 June 1798	25 April 1798	24 May 1798	

=== Intermediary ===
Name	Membership term		Ref.
Name	Begin date	End date	Ref.
Alexander Gogel	13 June 1798	17 August 1798	
Abraham Jacques de la Pierre	13 June 1798	17 August 1798	
Gerrit Jan Pijman	13 June 1798	17 August 1798	
Jacob Spoors	13 June 1798	17 August 1798	
Reinier Willem Tadama	13 June 1798	17 August 1798	

=== Constitutional ===
Name	Membership term		President term		Ref.
Name	Begin date	End date	Begin date	End date	Ref.
Augustijn Gerhard Besier	5 June 1799	17 October 1801	17 July 1799	16 August 1799	
Augustijn Gerhard Besier	5 June 1799	17 October 1801	17 December 1799	16 January 1800	
Augustijn Gerhard Besier	5 June 1799	17 October 1801	17 May 1800	16 June 1800	
Augustijn Gerhard Besier	5 June 1799	17 October 1801	17 October 1800	16 November 1800	
Augustijn Gerhard Besier	5 June 1799	17 October 1801	17 March 1801	16 April 1801	
Augustijn Gerhard Besier	5 June 1799	17 October 1801	17 August 1801	16 September 1801	
François Ermerins	10 August 1798	19 September 1801	17 October 1798	16 November 1798	
François Ermerins	10 August 1798	19 September 1801	17 March 1799	16 April 1799	
François Ermerins	10 August 1798	19 September 1801	17 August 1799	16 September 1799	
François Ermerins	10 August 1798	19 September 1801	17 January 1800	16 February 1800	
François Ermerins	10 August 1798	19 September 1801	17 June 1800	16 July 1800	
François Ermerins	10 August 1798	19 September 1801	17 November 1800	16 December 1800	
François Ermerins	10 August 1798	19 September 1801	17 April 1801	16 May 1801	
François Ermerins	10 August 1798	19 September 1801	17 September 1801	16 October 1801	
Anthonie Frederik Robbert Evert van Haersolte	10 August 1798	17 October 1801	17 November 1798	16 December 1798	
Anthonie Frederik Robbert Evert van Haersolte	10 August 1798	17 October 1801	17 April 1799	16 May 1799	
Anthonie Frederik Robbert Evert van Haersolte	10 August 1798	17 October 1801	17 September 1799	16 October 1799	
Anthonie Frederik Robbert Evert van Haersolte	10 August 1798	17 October 1801	17 February 1800	16 March 1800	
Anthonie Frederik Robbert Evert van Haersolte	10 August 1798	17 October 1801	17 July 1800	16 August 1800	
Anthonie Frederik Robbert Evert van Haersolte	10 August 1798	17 October 1801	17 December 1800	16 January 1801	
Anthonie Frederik Robbert Evert van Haersolte	10 August 1798	17 October 1801	17 May 1801	16 June 1801	
Anthonie Frederik Robbert Evert van Haersolte	10 August 1798	17 October 1801	17 October 1801	17 October 1801	
Joannes Willem van Hasselt	10 August 1798	11 June 17999	17 September 1798	16 October 1798	
Joannes Willem van Hasselt	10 August 1798	11 June 17999	17 February 1799	16 March 1799	
Albert Willem Hoeth	10 August 1798	9 June 1801	17 August 1798	16 September 1798	
Albert Willem Hoeth	10 August 1798	9 June 1801	17 January 1799	16 February 1799	
Albert Willem Hoeth	10 August 1798	9 June 1801	17 June 1799	16 July 1799	
Albert Willem Hoeth	10 August 1798	9 June 1801	17 November 1799	16 December 1799	
Albert Willem Hoeth	10 August 1798	9 June 1801	17 April 1800	16 May 1800	
Albert Willem Hoeth	10 August 1798	9 June 1801	17 September 1800	16 October 1800	
Albert Willem Hoeth	10 August 1798	9 June 1801	17 February 1801	16 March 1801	
Joannes Franciscus Rudolphus van Hooff	31 August 1798	1 June 1800	17 December 1798	16 January 1799	
Joannes Franciscus Rudolphus van Hooff	31 August 1798	1 June 1800	17 May 1799	16 June 1799	
Joannes Franciscus Rudolphus van Hooff	31 August 1798	1 June 1800	17 October 1799	16 November 1799	
Joannes Franciscus Rudolphus van Hooff	31 August 1798	1 June 1800	17 March 1800	16 April 1800	
Gerrit Jan Pijman	4 June 1801	17 October 1801	17 July 1801	16 August 1801	
Jean Henri van Swinden	4 June 1800	19 September 1801	17 August 1800	16 September 1800	
Jean Henri van Swinden	4 June 1800	19 September 1801	17 January 1801	16 February 1801	
Jean Henri van Swinden	4 June 1800	19 September 1801	17 June 1801	16 July 1801	
