= Carel de Vos van Steenwijk =

Dutch politician and diplomat

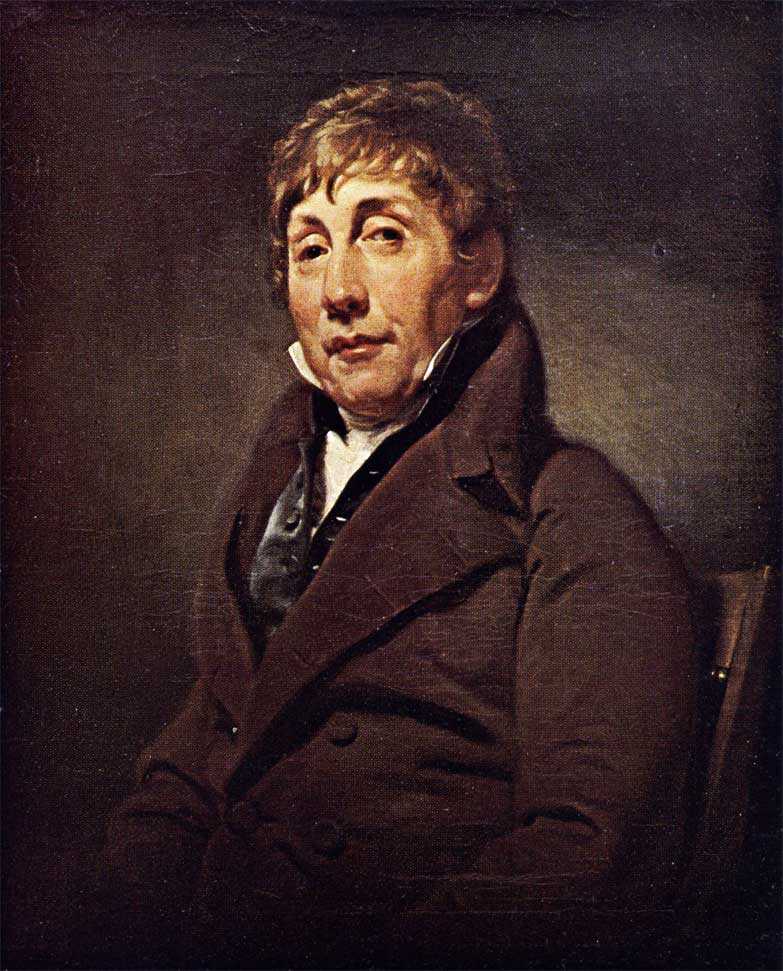

Personal details
- Born: March 11, 1758 Vollenhove. Dutch Republic
- Died: January 2, 1830 (aged 71)
- Party: Patriot

Military service
- Rank: Colonel
- Unit: exercitiegenootschap
- Battles/wars: Batavian Revolution

Carel de Vos van Steenwijk (11 March 1759 – 2 January 1830) was a Dutch politician and diplomat.

== Life ==
He was born in Vollenhove in 1759 into a rich noble family from Overijssel – his father was Jan Arent Godert de Vos van Steenwijk, a representative in the Estates General of the United Provinces and landdrost of Vollenhove and Kuinre. Carel and his brothers Godert Willem and Jan Arend de Vos van Steenwijk all played a major part in the Batavian Revolution, whilst Carel's son Jan Arend Godert also became a politician.

An ardent Patriot, he began as secretary to Pieter Johan van Berckel, the Dutch Republic's first ambassador to the United States of America, from 26 June 1783 to 8 July 1784. From 1785 to 1787 he was intendant for the lands of Drenthe and member of the region's diet. He was also colonel of the exercitiegenootschap of the village of De Wijk, but after the Batavian Revolution was initially defeated he was dismissed from all his roles.

The Revolution broke out again early in 1795 when Patriots rose up (with French military support led by Pichegru) in all of the United Provinces. William V, Prince of Orange opted for exile on 19 January, leaving the field open for the Batavian Republic to be set up. Carel de Vos van Steenwijk formed a revolutionary committee in Drenthe on 7 February and twelve days later this became Drenthe's provisional assembly, of which he was elected president. A federalist, he played a major role in gaining a provincial statute for Drenthe, previously only one of the Generality Lands. On 27 January 1796 he was elected deputy for Meppel in the first national Batavian assembly and appointed to the committee charged with writing a new constitution. He was president of the assembly from 6 to 20 February 1797 and re-elected as a deputy in August 1797. A unitarist coup d'État on 22 January 1798 ejected the Federalists from the assembly – De Vos van Steenwijk was imprisoned at Huis ten Bosch until 10 July, after another coup toppled the unitarists on 12 June.

He held no further posts until 4 June 1802, when he was briefly made a member of the general council for the department of Overijssel, before being made the Republic's ambassador to France on 14 September. When he returned from Paris in 1804 he was made Drenthe's representative on the legislative corps of the Republic. From 4 to 18 June 1806 De Vos acted as the Republic's grand pensionary, before Louis Bonaparte became king of Holland. On 16 February 1807 he was made a commander of the Order of the Union and in 1810 a baron of the Empire.

After France annexed the new kingdom in 1811, De Vos was made deputy for Bouches-de-l'Yssel on the legislative corps of the French Empire. He was also a member of the 'syndicat' for Holland, charged with paying off the former kingdom's debts, and on 29 February 1812 he was made a commander of the Order of the Reunion. After Napoleon's abdication in 1814, De Vos van Steenwijk entered the Estates General of Overijssel then the first chamber of the Estates General of the United Kingdom of the Netherlands from 1816 until his death in Zwolle in 1830. On 28 August 1814 he was made a jonkheer and on 11 March 1821 a baron (he was also lord of Dikninge and Hogerhof).
