= Fijnje =

Fijnje is a Dutch surname. Notable people with the surname include:

- Bobby Fijnje (born c. 1976), American criminal defendant
- Wybo Fijnje (1750–1809), Dutch Mennonite minister, publisher, and politician
