= Batavian coup of 22 January 1798 =

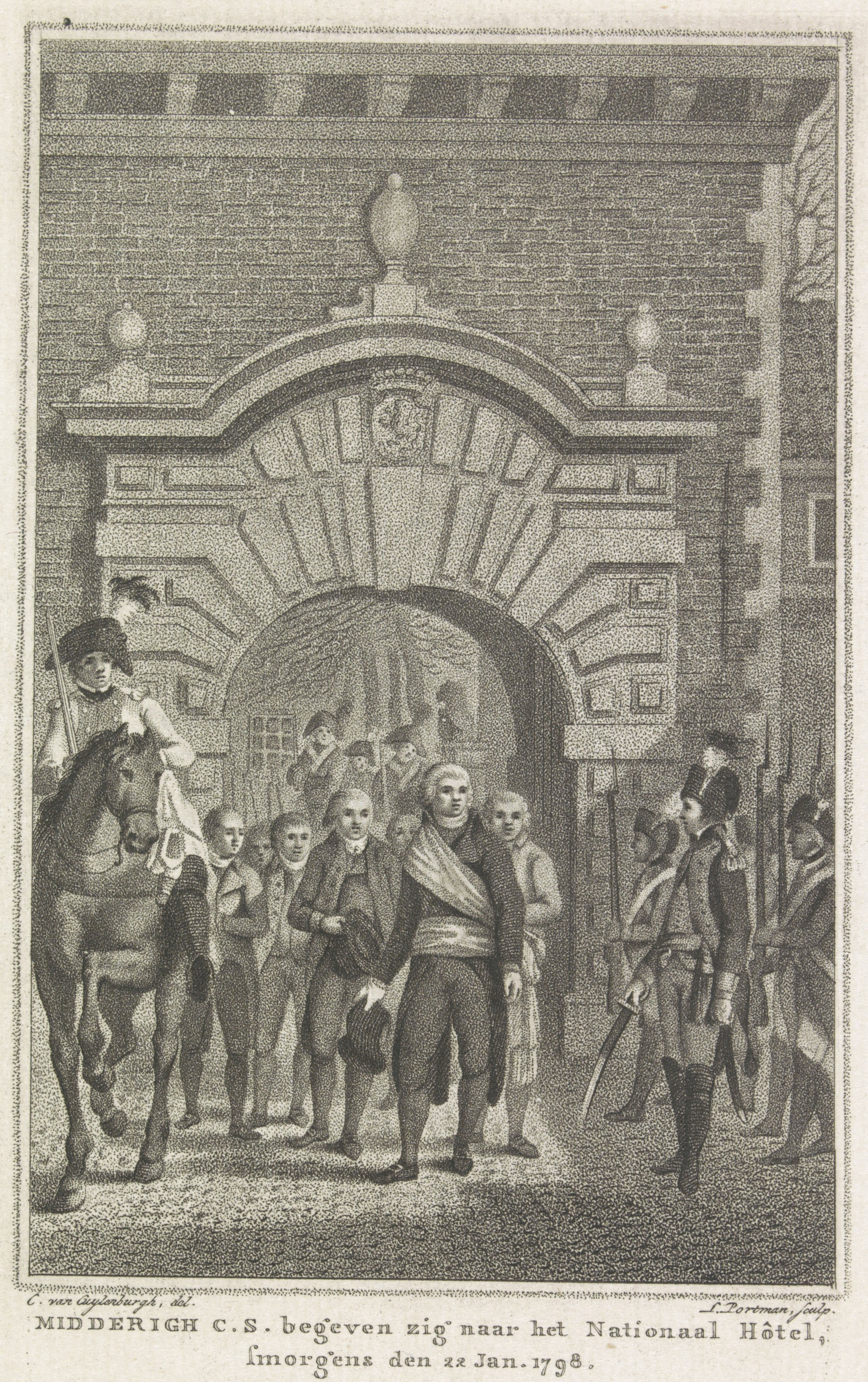
Chairman Johannes Henricus Midderigh is on his way to the National Assembly of the Batavian Republic on 22 January 1798.

The Batavian coup of 22 January 1798 was a successful non-violent coup d'état in the Batavian Republic that took place on 22 January 1798. The coup was staged by a radical minority in the National Assembly and had the support of the French envoy and generals of the French–Batavian army. Vital players in the coup were the radical politician Pieter Vreede, chairman of the National Assembly Johannes Henricus Midderigh, general Herman Willem Daendels and the French ambassador Charles Delacroix.

== Background ==
=== Dutch politics ===
The regime change that took place during the Batavian Revolution in 1795 was a fairly smooth affair. The foundations of the new political system were up for debate: the form of government, the structure of the state, and the nature of the sovereignty of the "people". It took more than a year for the Dutch revolutionaries to reach a consensus that a National Assembly of the Batavian Republic should convene to decide on these matters in the first place. Opinions diverged about the new form of the state. There was a faction of unitarists, who advocated the unitary state. Their direct opponents were the federalists, who wanted to improve the old system of the Dutch Republic. Besides these two groups, there was also a group of moderates, who practised realism between the two other political directions.

After endless debates the assembly voted in favour of a draft constitution, which several members of the assembly had to write. When it was finished, a referendum was held, and an overwhelming majority rejected it. New national elections in September 1797 resulted in a predominantly federalist and moderate assembly.

=== International dimensions ===
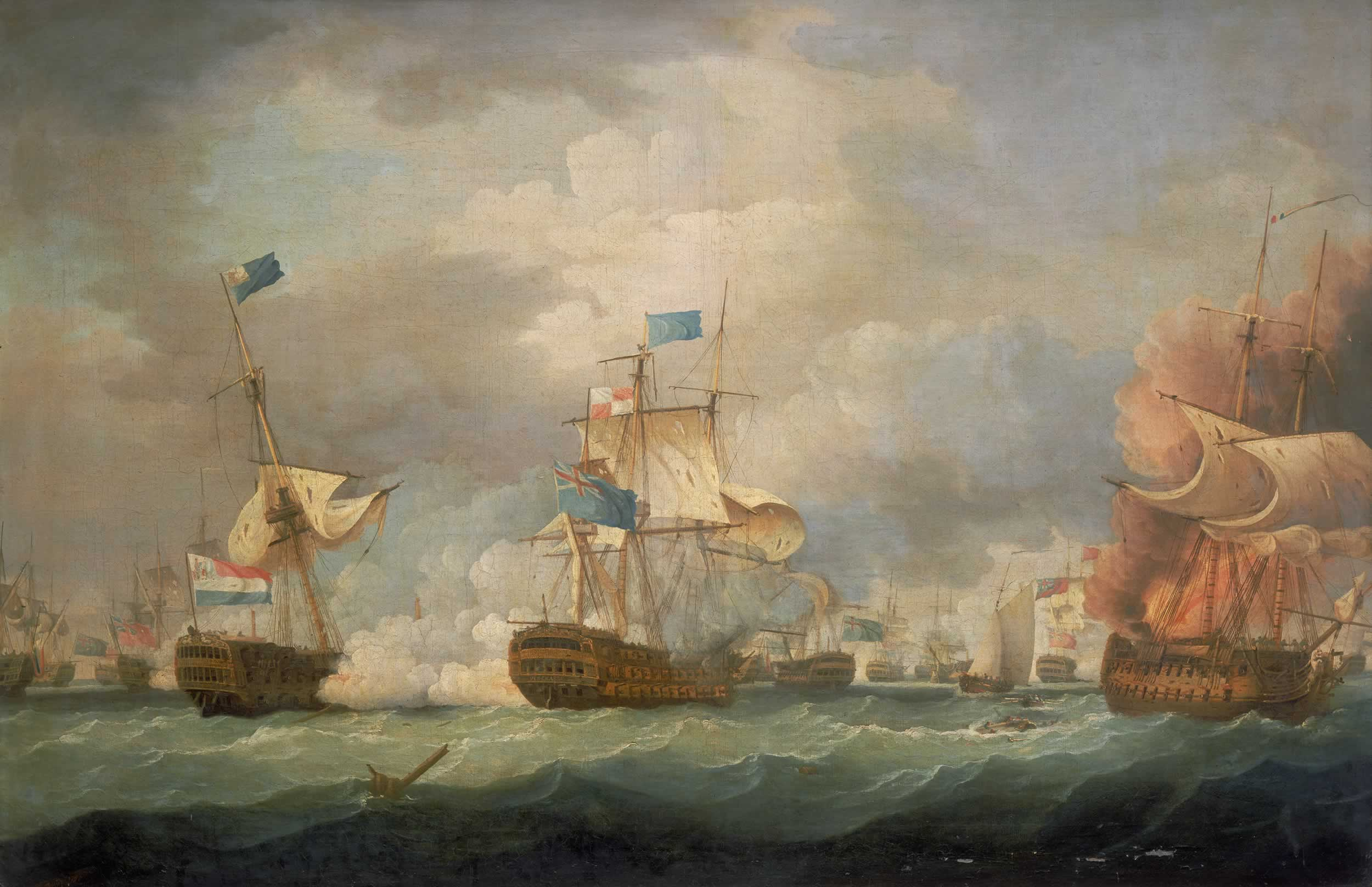
The battle of Camperdown, Thomas Whitcombe

On 4 September 1797 the coup of 18 Fructidor took place in the French Republic. The coup was directed against the royalists who had been elected and, in general, against the moderate, reactionary political climate that had prevailed in France since 1794. A month later, the Battle of Camperdown resulted in a staggering defeat of the Dutch fleet. This battle was perceived as a disaster. Despite agreements with France for a coordinated attack on England, France decided to postpone the plan, and the Dutch set sail on their own way. To prove their devotion to the revolutionary cause to the French, given their substandard contribution to the war effort, the Batavian Committee of Foreign Affairs decided to send Vice-Admiral Jan Willem de Winter to sea anyway. The international impotence and the national political deadlock were identified after the battle, including by the French ally. One of the conspirators, Stephanus Jacobus van Langen, described the failure of the committee as the main cause of the coup of 22 January.

The French French ambassador in The Hague, François-Joseph-Michel Noël and general Pierre de Ruel, marquis de Beurnonville were called back to Paris. The French Directoire replaced them with Charles Delacroix as ambassador and Barthélemy Catherine Joubert as commander of the French forces in the Batavian Republic. When Delacroix arrived in The Hague he brought with him a constitution for the republic, written by Pierre Daunou and had the instruction to get in contact with Pieter Vreede, the leader of the radical politicians. Delacroix contacted the radicals and asked them to draw up a script for the coup and to draw up a list of representatives who would be removed from the chamber. Meanwhile, Johannes Henricus Midderigh was elected as chairman of the assembly, and he would assume this office on 19 January. Midderigh was on the side of the conspirators, and with his help the coup could have been carried out through a semi-legal means.

== Coup ==
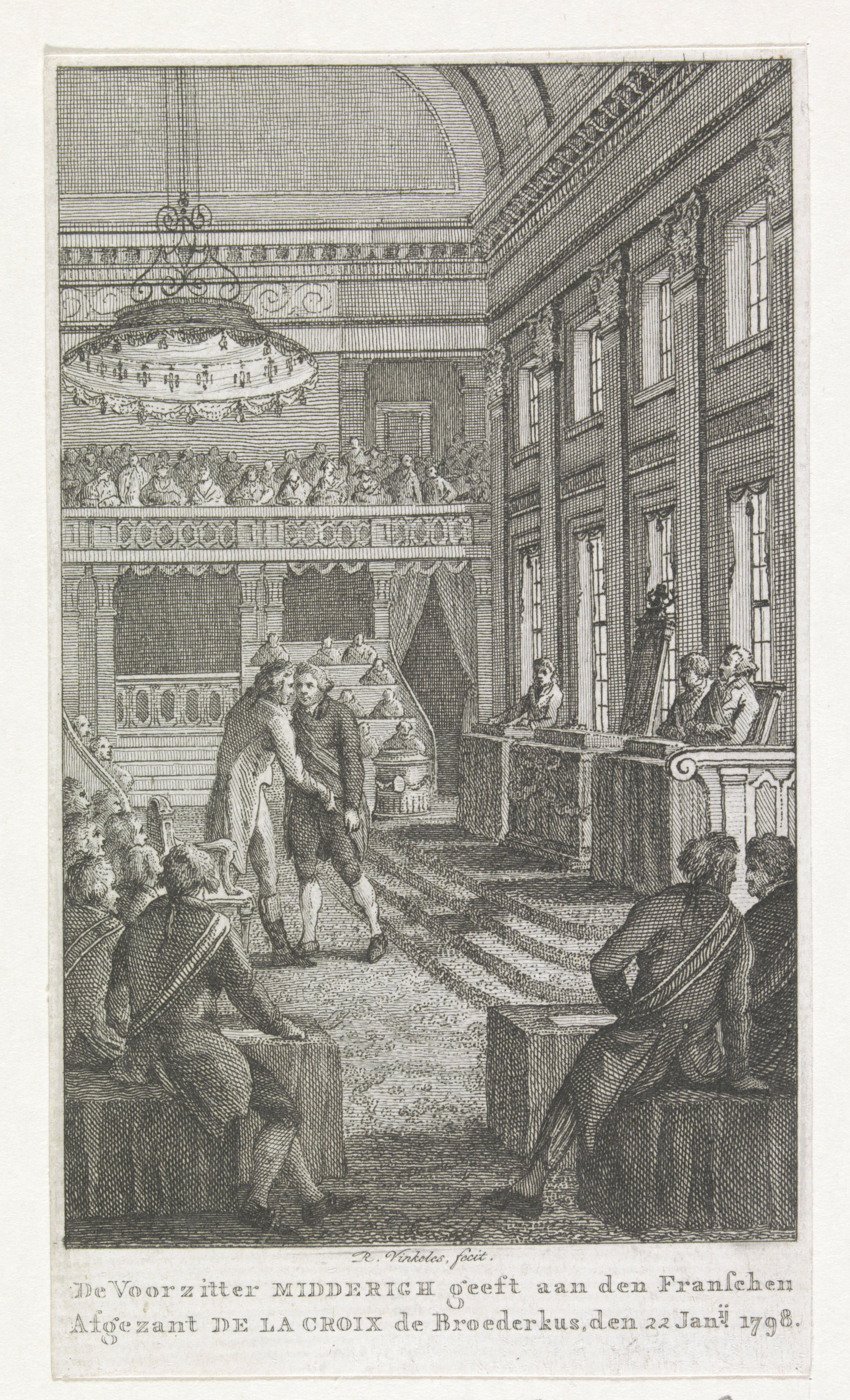
The brotherly kiss between Delacroix and Midderigh

On the night of 21 to 22 January, exactly at twelve o'clock, the coup began. Chairman Midderigh ordered the garrison to block every road into The Hague. All the representatives received a message that they had to come to the Binnenhof early in the morning. At the hall where the assembly was held, twenty representatives were arrested, including the members of the Committee of Foreign Affairs. Some of them got a house arrest, and others were brought to Huis ten Bosch where they were confined. At the National Assembly, the remaining representatives were forced to make a statement against the lack of government, the stadtholdership and to reject federalism and aristocracy. Eleven representatives refused to do this and left the assembly.

After they left, Midderigh came up with several proposals which gave the assembly the right to fill the vacant seats, to destroy the regional sovereignty and to reform the assembly to a Constitutional Assembly. After these proposals were accepted, there was loud cheering in the room. With a Vive les republiques! Delacroix was welcomed at the assembly and congratulated the Batavians, which was sealed by a brotherly kiss.

== Aftermath ==
The coup of 22 January had taken place in an orderly way. In the next days, a new Constitutional Committee was formed and a second committee, which was to advise on the formation of the executive power. This committee proposed to form the Uitvoerend Bewind, with Vreede, Van Langen, Wybo Fijnje, Berend Wildrik and Johannes Fokker as its members. After three months, a new Constitution was drafted, which was presented to the public. In a referendum, the Dutch public voted in favour of the new constitution. In the new constitution, the republic was transformed into a unitary state, and every citizen gained citizenship regardless of religion or church.

After the new Constitution had been accepted by the Batavian people, the radical assembly and government remained. This led to a counter coup on 12 June 1798 by the moderates and new elections resulted in a more moderate assembly and government.
