= 1798 Batavian Republic constitutional referendum =

Constitutional referendum held in the Batavian Republic in 1798

A constitutional referendum was held in the Batavian Republic on 23 April 1798, approving the Constitution for the Batavian People.

== Background ==
Following the French Revolution, the Patriots brought an end to the rule of stadtholder William V in the Dutch Republic, with support from the French army. They proclaimed the Batavian Republic, and established the National Assembly to draft a constitution. Its members disagreed about the extent of suffrage and about whether to organise the republic as a federal or unitary state. The Patriots had originally supported a federal state with autonomy for the provinces, but some wanted to emulate the unitary model of the French First Republic with a strong central government. A compromised constitution was rejected by the electorate in an August 1797 referendum.

On 22 January 1798, a coup d'état was carried out by those favouring a unitary state with the support of the French, who were dissatisfied with the referendum result and prolonged debates. The remaining members of the National Assembly finished drafting the Constitution for the Batavian People two months later.

== Results ==
Voters were asked on 21 April 1798 to approve the Constitution for the Batavian People. An overwhelming majority voted in favour, but only those who swore allegiance to the coup were allowed to vote.

Choice	Votes	%
For	153,913	92.99
Against	11,597	7.01
Total	165,510	100
Registered voters/turnout	400,000	–
Source: Direct Democracy

== Aftermath ==
After the referendum, another coup d'état was carried out by the Unitarians, and the constitution became effective in July 1798. The French, who had a major influence on the Batavian Republic, were not satisfied with the 1798 constitution, so a new constitution was written, for which a referendum in 1801 was organized.
