= Wybo Fijnje =

Dutch Mennonite minister, publisher, Patriot, exile, coup perpetrator and politician

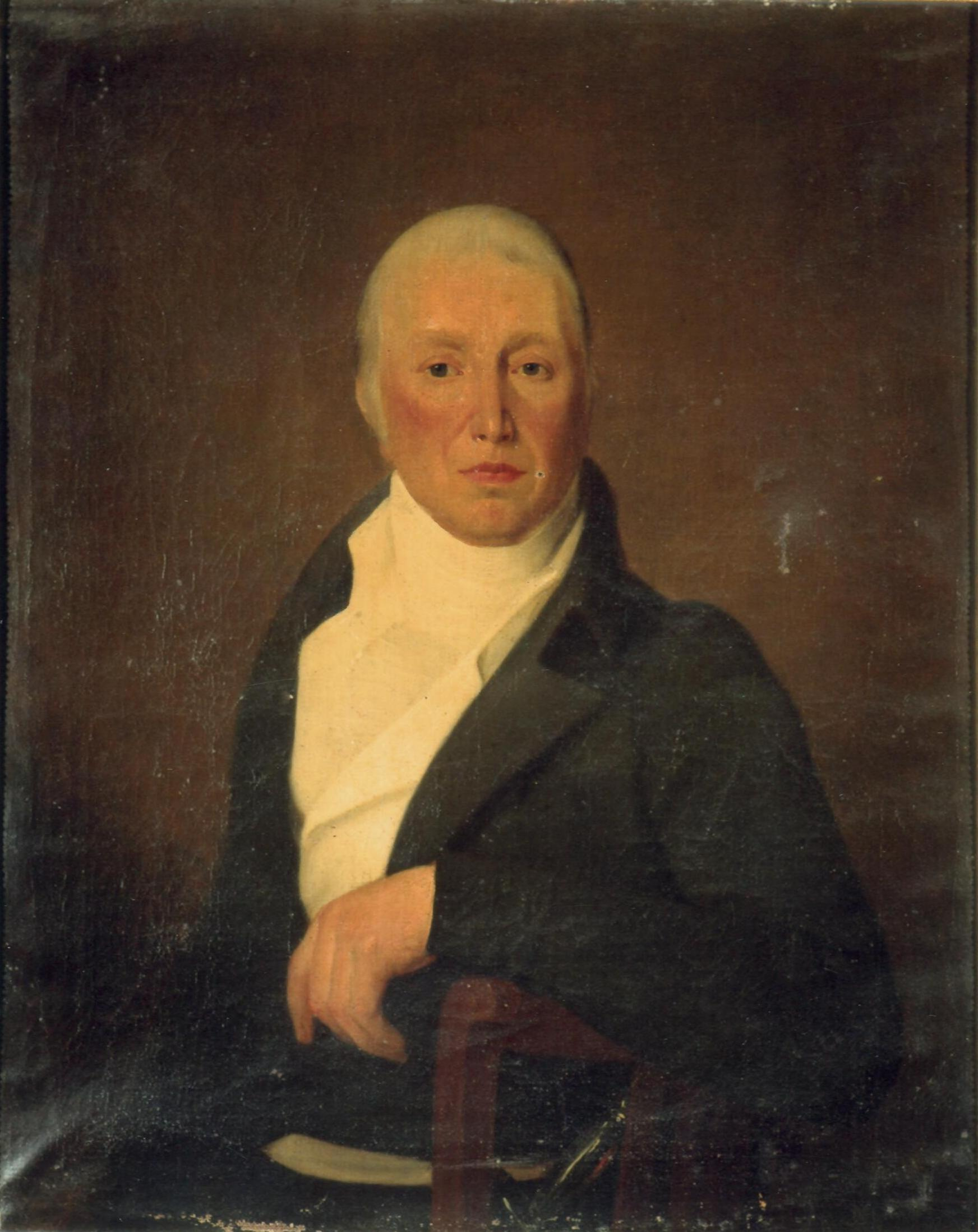
Wybo Fijnje; portrait attributed to Taco Scheltema

Wybo Fijnje (24 January 1750 in Zwolle – 2 October 1809 in Amsterdam) was a Dutch Mennonite minister, publisher in Delft, Patriot, exile, coup perpetrator, politician and - during the Batavian Republic and Kingdom of Holland - manager of the predecessor of the Staatscourant publication.

== Life ==
=== Early life ===
Fijnje grew up in Haarlem, where his father Jan Fijnje, originally from Harlingen, was also a minister. His parents died in 1763. He studied in Amsterdam, but moved in 1771 to Leiden and came in contact with the Collegiants in Rijnsburg. Fijnje began his career as a Mennonite preacher in Deventer (1774); he completed his PhD in the same year. He was then called to Delft, where he had already (c.1775) taken up an editorial desk for the "Hollandsche Historische Courant". Fijnje was probably inspired by the publishing activities and the internationally renowned paper of his wife's family in Leiden, for in November 1775 he had married Emilie Luzac, the publisher's daughter.

=== Patriots ===
In January 1783 Fijnje came into conflict with the Prussian ambassador to the Dutch Republic, Friedrich Wilhelm von Thulemeyer, who felt insulted by one of Fijnje's articles in the Courant. Fijnje was forced to apologize by the Delft burgemeesters (as freedom of the press was still limited in the old Republic). Johan Luzac, writing under the pseudonym Attica in Fijnje's Dutch-language paper, therefore warned his brother-in-law to practice more discretion in dealing with his co-worker, the journalist Gerrit Paape, who routinely expounded anti-orangist points of view. In 1783 Fijnje was involved in the foundation of the exercitiegenootschappen. In 1785 he was one of the drafters of the Leids Ontwerp ("Leiden Draft", a Patriot manifesto), together with Pieter Vreede and Rutger Jan Schimmelpenninck, among others. On 21 August 1785 Fijnje - as a delegate - read a revolutionary declaration in the council hall of Delft. Eleven members of the vroedschap were asked to leave, after which eight Patriots could be installed. All this happened without the stadholder's knowledge or consent (necessary under the Regeringsreglementen - "Government Regulations"), but with the assent of the population, although they apparently remained outside, silent, watching the flying column under the leadership of Adam Gerard Mappa, a type-setter. A baker who sold "orange cakes" (a symbol of the Orangist party) was court-martialed and put under house arrest. The exercitiegenootschap took over Delft's ammunition and weapons store (largest in the Republic), where later the army museum was housed for a number of years. Their example was followed in Leiden, Dordrecht, Alkmaar, Hoorn and Monnikendam, even under the threat of a Prussian ultimatum and raid.

=== Exile in northern France ===
Wijbo Fijnje was one of the convinced and militant Patriots who were forced to leave the city on 19 September 1787, when the Prussian army occupied Delft. The population of Delft took revenge on the exercitiegenootschap by smashing up a room full of Delftware painted with symbols of freedom, and throwing its contents into a city canal. The Fijnje family went to Antwerp, later to Brussels and finally to Watten (French-Flanders). Johan Valckenaer, Herman Willem Daendels and Mappa rented - on Fijnje's initiative - a castle, on top of a hill. The four families and three bachelors cleaned up the rooms, grew vegetables and played billiards. Emilie died in 1788 and Fijnje married a Frenchwoman, Marie Françoise Constance Ténar. When the members of the association were accused by the local population of growing and selling grain, the commune was dissolved in 1792. Mappa emigrated to the U.S. and began the first type foundry in New York; Valckenaer moved to Paris.

=== Batavian Republic ===
In 1795 Fijnje returned to the Netherlands (after the Batavian Revolution), after which he became a member of the commité van waakzaamheid (the Batavian version of the French Committee of Public Safety), chaired the Provisional Representatives of the People of Holland for a while. and - together with Samuel Iperusz Wiselius and professor Theodorus van Kooten - served on the committee for the liquidation of the VOC. In all these posts he took radical viewpoints, but he also enjoyed himself thoroughly. On 22 January 1798, he performed a Coup d'état with general Herman Willem Daendels, Pieter Vreede and Van Langen to guarantee "the unity and indivisibility" of the Batavian republic. Fijnje represented the Uitvoerend Bewind and founded the "Binnenlandse Bataafse Courant" (Interior Batavian Courier). The controversial unitarissen did not long remain in power, for on 12 June 1798 general Daendels led another coup, this time putting the "moderates" in power in the Uitvoerend Bewind. For the corrupt former exiles with explicit opinions, whether democrat or aristocrat, there was no longer any place. Fijnje and Van Langen were locked up until the end of the year in the Gevangenpoort, accused of embezzling state money by the public prosecutor Van Maanen, but never put on trial.

Fijnje became a private citizen and busied himself with an old hobby, higher mathematics, and stayed indoors for weeks at a time. On recommendation of Rutger Jan Schimmelpenninck, Alexander Gogel and Hendrik van Rays, Fijnje became editor-in-chief of the Bataafse Staatscourant (Batavian state courier) in 1805; his son Jean was deputy editor. He got the use of the domain het Kleine Loo. When the editorial office was moved to Amsterdam, Jonas Daniel Meijer was appointed editor-in-chief. Fijnje seems to have been unable through illness to keep up the job, but was kept on as a nominal manager.

== Works ==
- 1774 Theoriae Systematis Universi specimen philosophicum (dissertations)
- 1783 Beknopte tijdrekenkundig begrip der algemeene geschiedenis; 2 delen, waarvan het tweede deel verloren is gegaan. (Brief summary of the general history; 2 parts, of which the second part is lost.)

== Bibliography ==
- Fijnje-Luzac, E. Myne beslommerde boedel; brieven in ballingschap 1787 - 1788. Ed. Jacques J.M. Baartmans 2003.
- Kroes-Ligtenberg, C. (1957) Dr. Wybo Fijnje (1750 - 1809); belevenissen van een journalist in de patriottentijd.
- Roosendaal, J. (2003) Bataven! Nederlandse vluchtelingen in Frankrijk 1787-1795.
- Schama, S. (1977) Patriots and Liberators. Revolution in the Netherlands 1780 - 1830.
