= Theodorus van Kooten =

Dutch poet, professor and politician

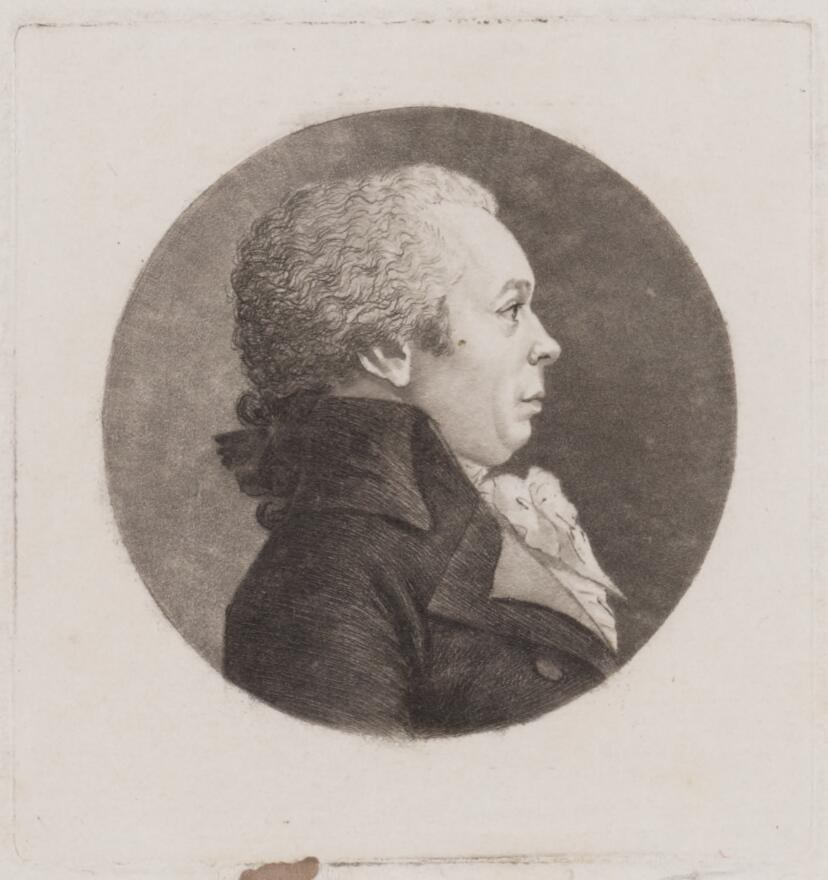
Theodorus van Kooten

Dr. Theodorus van Kooten (Leeuwarden, 22 October 1749 – Bennebroek, 1 February 1813) was a Dutch poet, professor and politician.

Van Kooten was the son of the sexton at Leeuwarden, and amazed all visitors to his father's house by translating randomly selected pieces from the Greek bible into Dutch. Van Kooten became Kampen's rector in 1772. From 1784, he was professor of Latin language and history at the College of Franeker; his students included Adam Nodell, Hendrik van Waardenburg and Herman Bosscha. He had to take forced redundancy from there in 1787 due to his Patriot sympathies. He remained in exile in Saint-Omer until 1795, where he wrote Latin poems.

Van Kooten was - together with Wybo Fijnje and Samuel Iperusz Wiselius - a member of the committee for the deconstruction of the VOC (Dutch East India Company). On the recommendation of Johannes Henricus Nieuwold, in 1798 Van Kooten became the first minister of education ("Agent for National Education"). A year later he was replaced by Johannes van der Palm. He traveled to Madrid as secretary to Johan Valckenaer, who had become the Batavian Republic's extraordinary ambassador to Spain; in 1801 they returned, but van Kooten remained Valckenaer's housemate in Bennebroek, while his wife and children lived in Kampen. "Dorus Droefheid" died aged 63.

== Publications ==
Van Kooten’s books include;

- Deliciae Poeticae (1792)
- Incerti auctoris vulgo Pindari Thebani Epitome Iliadas Homericae, (1806) (with Henricus Weytingh)
