= 1801 Batavian Republic constitutional referendum =

1801 constitutional referendum in the Batavian Republic

A constitutional referendum was held in the Batavian Republic on 6 October 1801. After a previous referendum in 1798 resulted in a new constitution being approved, the French were not satisfied with this constitution, and under their influence a new constitution was written.

In 1801, a referendum was held about the new constitution. Non-voters were counted as if they agreed to the new constitution, and the constitution passed with 87.46% in favour. On 16 October 1801, the new constitution became official.

== Results ==
Choice	Votes	%
For	364,200	87.46
Against	52,219	12.54
Total	416,419	100
Registered voters/turnout	416,419	100
Source: Direct Democracy
