= Matthew Helmers =

American engineer

- Born: Matthew Justin Helmers
- Education: Iowa State University; Virginia Tech; University of Nebraska–Lincoln
- Occupation: Civil engineer

Matthew Justin Helmers is an American engineer.

Helmers earned his bachelor's degree in civil engineering from Iowa State University and pursued master's level study in the same field at Virginia Tech, which he completed in 1997. He then obtained a doctorate in agricultural engineering from the University of Nebraska–Lincoln in 2003, and returned to Iowa State as a faculty member. At ISU, Helmers holds the Dean's Professorship in the College of Agriculture and Life Sciences.
