= Jan Frederik Helmers =

Dutch poet (1767–1813)

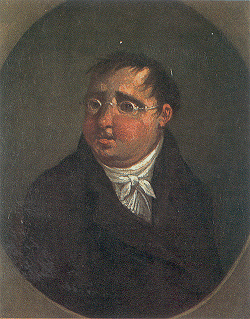
Jan Frederik Helmers.

Jan Frederik Helmers (March 7, 1767 – February 26, 1813), was a Dutch poet born in Amsterdam.

== Works ==
His early poems, Night (1788) and Socrates (1790), were tame and sentimental, but after 1805 he determined, in company with his brother-in-law, Cornelis Loots (1765–1834), to rouse national feeling by a burst of patriotic poetry.

His Poems (2 vols, 1809–1810), but especially his great work The Dutch Nation, a poem in six cantos (1812), created great enthusiasm and enjoyed immense success. Even the published censored version was contentious enough that only his premature death prevented an arrest by the French occupation. He owed his success mainly to the integrity of his patriotism and the opportune moment at which he sounded his counter-blast to the French oppression. His posthumous poems were collected in 1815.

A neighbourhood in Amsterdam is named Helmersbuurt in his honour, built 1891–1902, with not less than three streets called after Helmers: the Eerste, Tweede and Derde Helmersstraat (First, Second and Third Helmers Street in English).
