= 1797 Batavian Republic constitutional referendum =

1797 referendum on the constitution of the Batavian Republic

A referendum on the constitution of the Batavian Republic was held on August 8, 1797. The draft constitution was rejected, eventually culminating in a coup d'état.

== Background ==
Following the French Revolution, the Patriots brought an end to the rule of stadtholder William V in the Dutch Republic, with support from the French army. They proclaimed the Batavian Republic, and established the National Assembly to draft a constitution, which would be put to a referendum. Its members disagreed about the extent of suffrage and about whether to organise the republic as a federal or unitary state. The Patriots had originally supported a federal state with autonomy for the provinces, but some wanted to emulate the unitary model of the French First Republic with a strong central government. After two years of debate, a draft constitution with compromises was completed on May 10, 1797.

== Results ==
Official results (Note: The official result differs slightly from the actual result due to counting errors and the late receipt of some changes. The actual result is 27,941 votes in favor and 108,854 votes against.)
Choice	Votes	%
For	27,955	20.45
Against	108,761	79.55
Total	136,716	100
Registered voters/turnout	~400,000	–

== Aftermath ==
The draft constitution had been rejected by almost eighty percent, which meant that a new Constitution would have to be drafted. In the elections for the National Assembly a few months later, the supporters of a unitary state won the majority, but the supporters of a federal state retained the majority in the constitutional commission. Meanwhile, in France, the radicals led by Pierre Augereau had seized power. With French help, the radical unitarists staged a coup d'état in January 1798. A new draft constitution, establishing a unitary republic, was quickly adopted in the National Assembly. The Constitution for the Batavian People was approved in a referendum on April 23, 1798.
