= National Assembly of the Batavian Republic =

Defunct legislature in the Netherlands

National Assembly Nationale Vergadering

History
- Founded: 1 March 1796
- Disbanded: 22 January 1798
- Preceded by: States General of the Batavian Republic

Meeting place
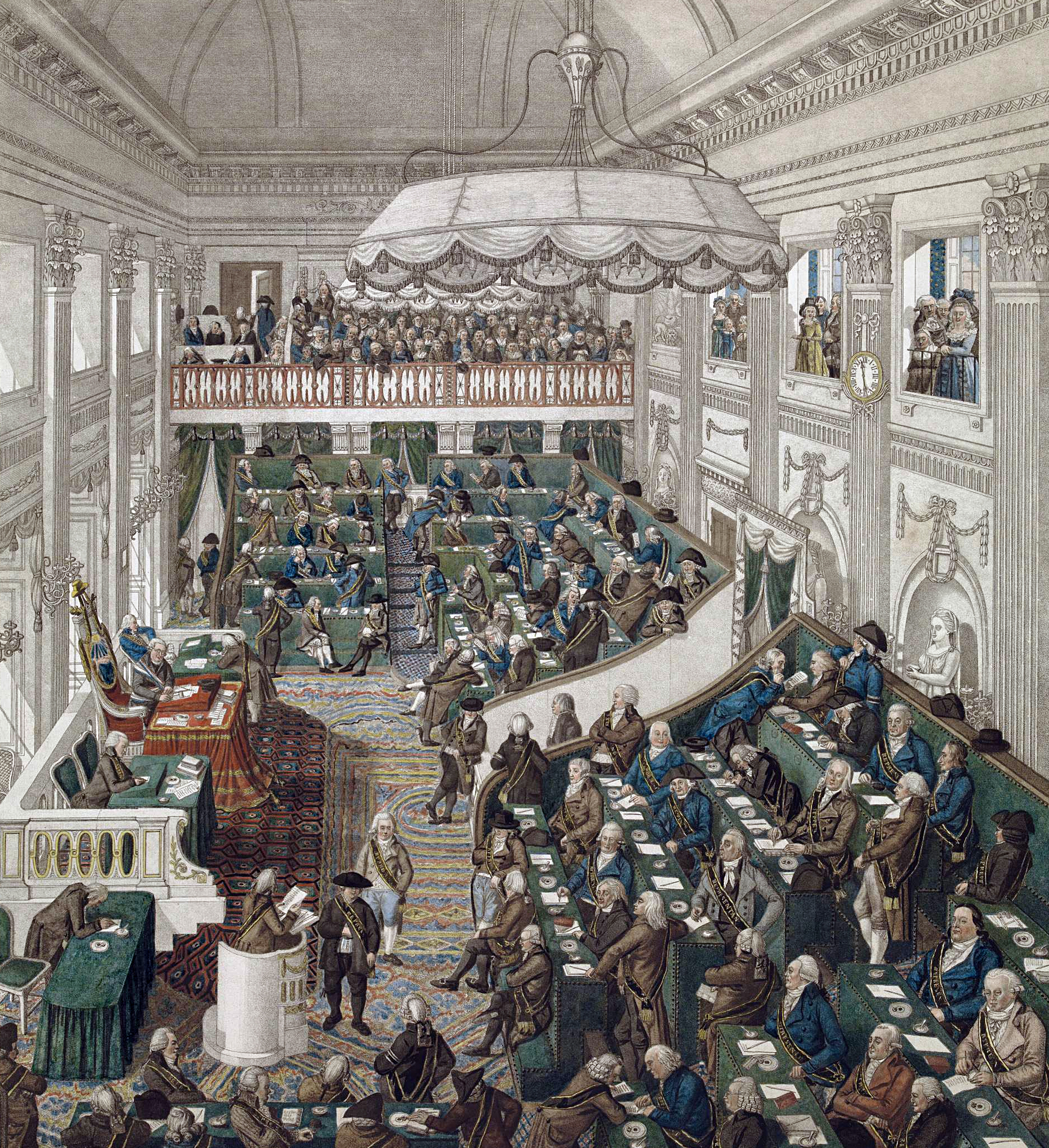
- Oude Zaal, Binnenhof, The Hague

Constitution
- Reglement volgens het welke eene algeemene Nationaale Vergadering door het Volk van Nederland zal worden by een geroepen en werkzaam zyn

The National Assembly of the Batavian Republic (Dutch: Nationale Vergadering) was the Dutch parliament between 1796 and 1798.

== History ==
Following the proclamation of the Batavian Republic, the States General of the Netherlands disbanded itself in January 1796 and called for elections for the National Assembly. Wealthy adult men who had sworn an oath to popular sovereignty were allowed to vote. The First National Assembly met on 1 March 1796 in the ballroom of former stadtholder William V, which would remain the seat of parliament until 1992. The President of the National Assembly was head of state of the Batavian Republic between 1796 and 1798, during his term in office (usually just half a month).

The assembly was tasked with drafting a constitution, which would be put to a referendum. Members were divided about the extent of suffrage as well as between those supporting a federal state, with most power vested in regional governments, and those supporting a unitary state, with most power vested in the national government. Autonomy of provinces had been important in the preceding Dutch Republic, but some wanted to copy the revolutionary unitary government of the French First Republic. The constitution that was drafted contained many compromises. It was rejected in the August 1797 referendum.

The French government, dissatisfied with the result and prolonged discussions, ordered French troops in the Batavian Republic to support a coup d'état by the supporters of a unitary state. On 22 January 1798, members of the Second National Assembly in favour of a unitary state were escorted to the chamber by the military, while those opposing it were imprisoned. The rump assembly abolished provincial autonomy, and it appointed the five-member executive Uitvoerend Bewind. Pieter Vreede and General Herman Willem Daendels played an important role in this coup. The rump assembly drafted the Constitution for the Batavian People, which was adopted by an overwhelming majority in an April 1798 referendum. Only those who had sworn allegiance to the coup were allowed to vote. The rump assembly was itself dissolved after a second coup on 12 June 1798, again supported by Daendels.

A new parliament under the name Representative Body (Dutch: Vertegenwoordigend Lichaam) came into being in May 1798 after elections held under a new constitution. Under that new constitution, the head of state of the Batavian Republic was a member of the Uitvoerend Bewind. Following the June 1798 coup, the name changed to Intermediary Legislative Body (Dutch: Intermediair Wetgevend Lichaam), but it was changed back to Representative Body a month later. In 1801 it was replaced with a new 35-member parliament named the Legislative Body (Dutch: Wetgevend Lichaam).

== Presidents of the National Assembly ==
- Pieter Paulus 1 March 1796 – 17 March 1796
- Pieter Leonard van de Kasteele 18 March 1796 – 1 April 1796
- Albert Johan de Sitter 1 April 1796 – 17 April 1796
- Jan Bernd Bicker 17 April 1796 – 3 May 1796
- Daniël Cornelis de Leeuw 3 May 1796 – 17 May 1796
- Rutger Jan Schimmelpenninck 17 May 1796 – 30 May 1796
- Joan Arend de Vos van Steenwijk 30 May 1796 – 13 June 1796
- Jacob George Hieronymus Hahn 13 June 1796 – 27 June 1796
- Paulus Hartog 27 June 1796 – 11 July 1796
- Willem Aernout de Beveren 11 July 1796 – 25 July 1796
- Ludovicus Timon de Kempenaer 25 July 1796 – 8 August 1796
- Jan Pieter van Wickevoort Crommelin 8 August 1796 – 22 August 1796
- Paulus Emmanuel Anthonie de la Court 22 August 1796 – 5 September 1796
- Jacob Jan Cambier 5 September 1796 – 19 September 1796
- Jacobus Kantelaar 19 September 1796 – 3 October 1796
- Tammo Adriaan ten Berge 3 October 1796 – 17 October 1796
- Bernardus Blok 17 October 1796 – 31 October 1796
- Gerrit David Jordens 31 October 1796 – 14 November 1796
- Abraham Gijsbertus Verster 14 November 1796 – 28 November 1796
- IJsbrand van Hamelsveld 28 November 1796 – 12 December 1796
- Cornelis van Lennep 12 December 1796 – 26 December 1796
- Jan Hendrik Stoffenberg 26 December 1796 – 9 January 1797
- Lambert Engelbert van Eck 9 January 1797 – 23 January 1797
- Willem Queysen 23 January 1797 – 6 February 1797
- Carel de Vos van Steenwijk 6 February 1797 – 20 February 1797
- Hendrik van Castrop 20 February 1797 – 6 March 1797
- Meinardus Siderius 6 March 1797 – 20 March 1797
- Cornelis Wilhelmus de Rhoer 20 March 1797 – 3 April 1797
- Jan Couperus 3 April 1797 – 17 April 1797
- Jacob Abraham de Mist 17 April 1797 – 1 May 1797
- Jan Bernd Bicker 1 May 1797 – 15 May 1797
- Rutger Jan Schimmelpenninck 15 May 1797 – 29 May 1797
- Gerard Willem van Marle 29 May 1797 – 12 June 1797
- Herman Hendrik Vitringa 12 June 1797 – 26 June 1797
- Johan Herman de Lange 26 June 1797 – 10 July 1797
- Ambrosius Justus Zubli 10 July 1797 – 24 July 1797
- Willem Hendrik Teding van Berkhout 24 July 1797 – 7 August 1797
- Scato Trip 7 August 1797 – 21 August 1797
- Pieter Leonard van de Kasteele 21 August 1797 – 1 September 1797
- Jan David Pasteur 1 September 1797 – 18 September 1797
- Adrianus Ploos van Amstel 18 September 1797 – 2 October 1797
- Joachim Nuhout van der Veen 2 October 1797 – 16 October 1797
- Hugo Gevers 16 October 1797 – 30 October 1797
- Jacob van Manen 30 October 1797 – 13 November 1797
- Pieter Vreede 13 November 1797 – 27 November 1797
- Stefanus Jacobus van Langen 27 November 1797 – 11 December 1797
- Jacobus Blaauw 11 December 1797 – 25 December 1797
- Joan Bernard Auffmorth 25 December 1797 – 8 January 1798
- Joannes Franciscus Rudolphus van Hooff 8 January 1798 – 19 January 1798
- Johannes Henricus Midderigh 19 January 1798 – 25 January 1798
