= Pieter Vreede =

Dutch politician (1750–1837)

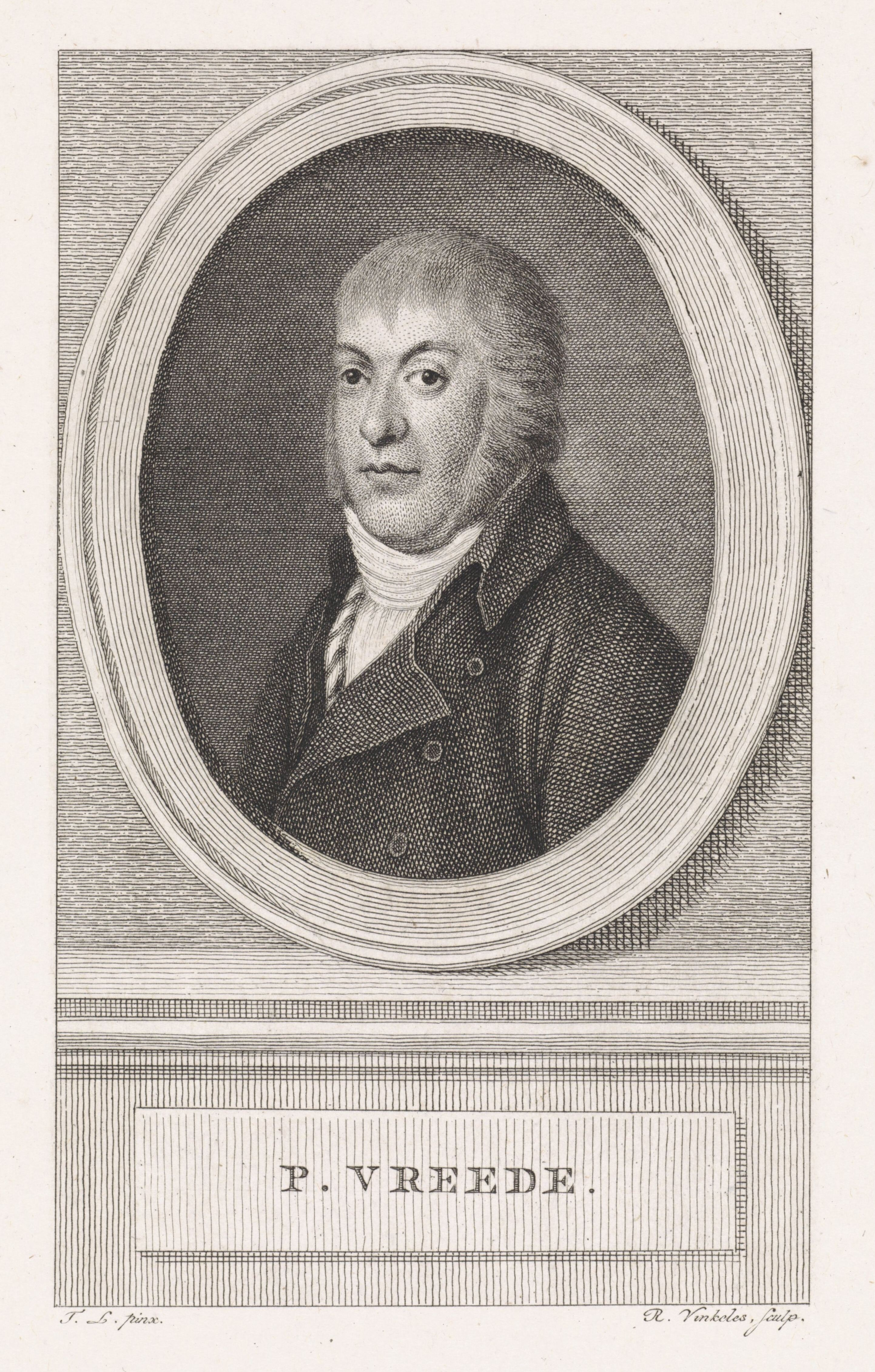
Portrait of Pieter Vreede

Pieter Vreede (October 8, 1750 – September 21, 1837) was a Dutch politician of the Batavian Republic in the 18th century. Vreede was born in Leiden and died in Heusden. He was a prominent critic of stadholderian misrule and of the urban patriciate.

== Early life ==
In Leiden, Vreede worked as a cloth and wool manufacturer, as his father had. Pieter Vreede was member of the Maatschappij der Nederlandsche Letterkunde (organization of writers and readers) and published some writings about the bad shape of the Dutch society.

== Revolution and later ==
The patriotic revolution broke out in the 1780s in the Netherlands and Pieter Vreede was one of the enthusiastic participants. Pieter and his friend Wijbo Fijnje made a constitution for Leiden, helped found the local exercitiegenootschap, a drill society, and helped draft the celebrated Leiden Draft. In 1786, he became a member of the revolutionary town council of Leiden. Vreede joined in a diplomatic expedition in Woerden in 1786. The revolution came to an end, when the Prussian army invaded the Netherlands in 1787. Pieter lost his business in Prussian Emmerich, so his business was reverted to Lier in the Austrian Netherlands.

Revolution broke out in the Austrian Netherlands as well in 1790, when the United States of Belgium were proclaimed. Pieter left Leiden, stopped his business in Lier and settled in Brabant of the States in the city Tilburg, where he continued his business as cloth and wool manufacturer until 1800.

France conquered Brabant in 1794 and Pieter Vreede immediately sided with the French. The French were very popular in the Netherlands. Many opposed the Orangist regime due to the Prussian Invasion of 1787. In 1794, he became a member of Batavian committee of Den Bosch. The same year, he became a member of the revolutionary committee of Brabant. The French continued their advance into the Netherlands and Pieter Vreede became a member of the administration of the conquered areas of the Netherlands in January 1795. Revolution broke out in the Netherlands and William V, Prince of Orange had to flee to England. The Batavian Republic was proclaimed.

== Life in government ==
Pieter Vreede became a member of the municipality of Tilburg in April 1795. He became a member of the provisional government council of North Brabant in June 1795. He was chosen in the first democratically elected parliament of the Netherlands, the National Assembly of the Batavian Republic in 1796 for the district of Bergen op Zoom. He was chairman of the parliament from 13 November 1797 to 27 November 1797.

Vreede was the most outspoken spokesman of the unitarian democratic parliament members. The unitarian democrats were in favour of a centralized government and of general elections for all adult men. The majority in the parliament was in favour of federalism and semi-democratic elections for property owners. Pieter Vreede and Wijbo Fijnje did a coup d'état in January 1798 and ruled for a few months, alienating both enemies and friends. Another coup d'état in June brought an end to his rule and Vreede had to flee from the Netherlands to Lier, which was French territory at that time.

=== Later life ===
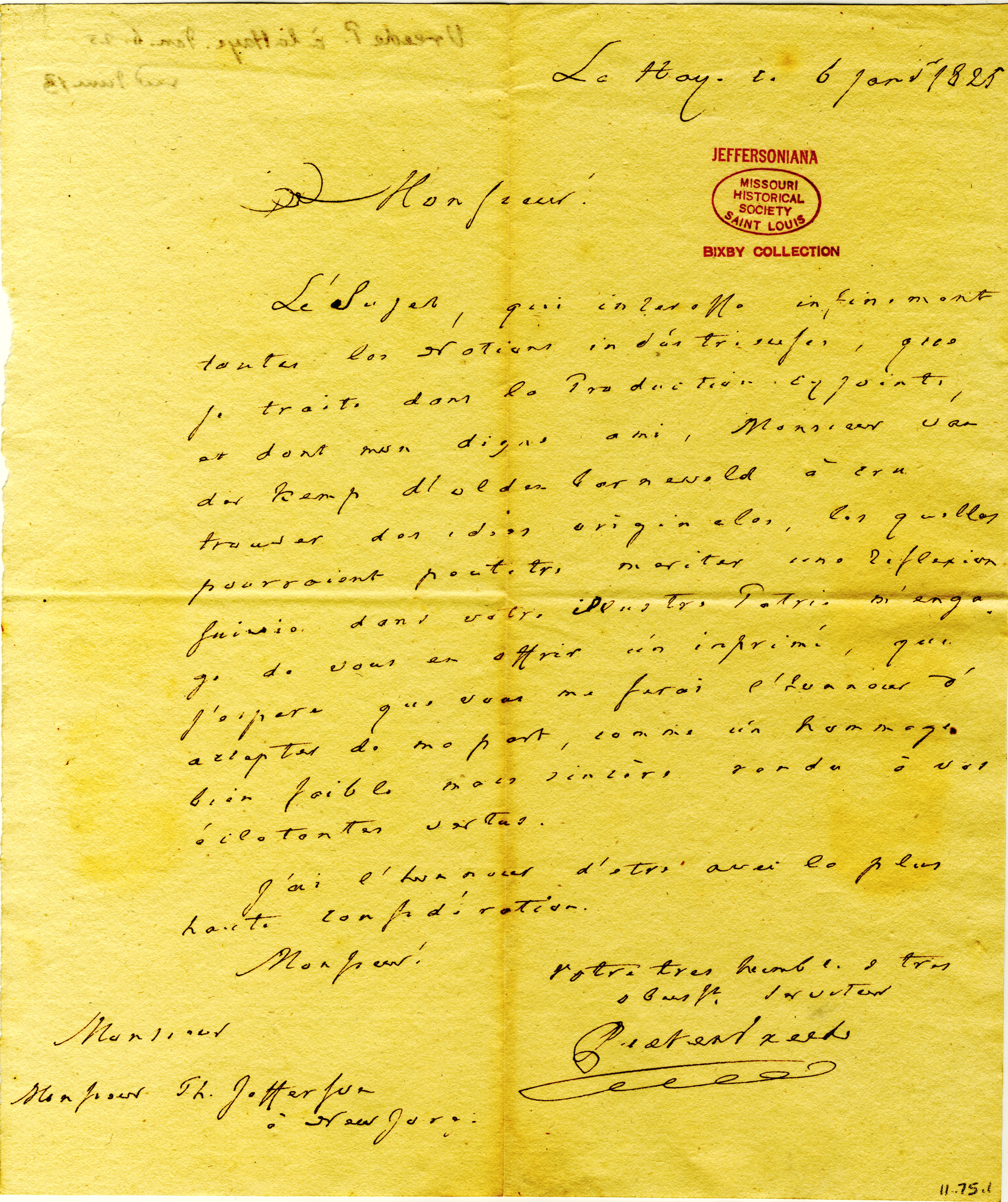
Letter by Pieter Vreede to Thomas Jefferson (1825)

He came back to the Netherlands in the same year and settled in Tilburg where his manufactury was. He stopped his business in 1800 and settled in Waalre.

His political career continued in 1815, when the French were gone and the United Kingdom of the Netherlands was proclaimed. He was a member of the provincial council of North Brabant from 1815 onwards. He worked as commissionary of the customs office first local and then on a national level until his death in 1837.

== Family ==
Pieter Vreede was married and widowed three times. He had 12 children.
