= Constitution for the Batavian People =

Supreme law of the Batavian Republic

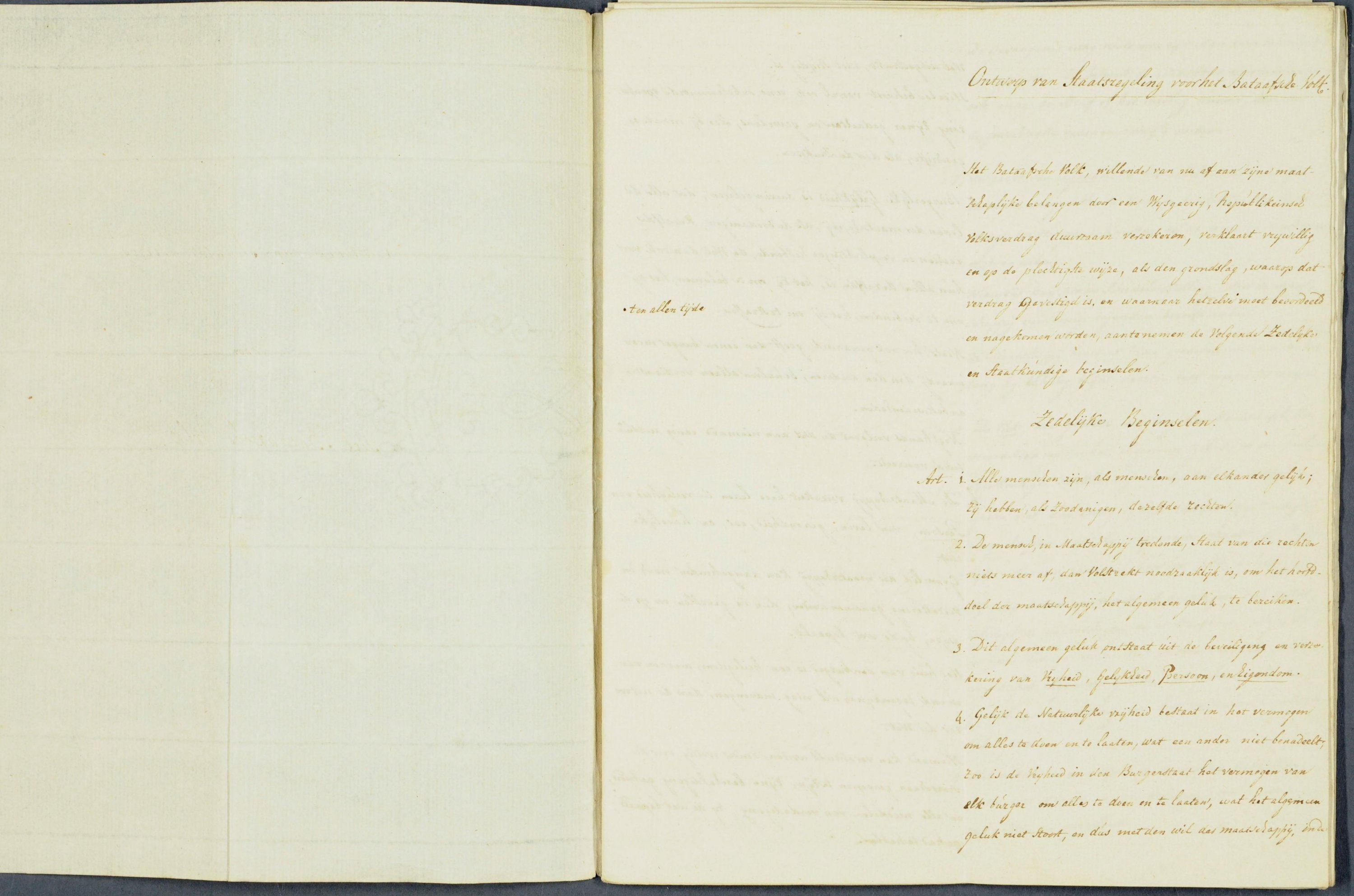

The Constitution for the Batavian People (Dutch: Staatsregeling voor het Bataafsche Volk) was the first constitution of the Netherlands. It was the supreme law of the Batavian Republic after it was enacted in 1798.

== Contents ==
The document declared that the Batavian people had formed an indivisible state. It outlined the organisation of the national government, with an elected parliament that was superior to other government organs. It enshrined equality between citizens and the right to due process. It included civil rights such as freedom of speech, assembly, the press, and religion as well as the right to property.

== Background ==
Following the French Revolution, the Patriots brought an end to the rule of stadtholder William V with support from the French army. They proclaimed the Batavian Republic, named after the Batavi tribe, and founded the National Assembly to draft a constitution, which would be put to a referendum. Its members disagreed about the extent of suffrage and about whether to organise the republic as a federal or unitary state. The Patriots had originally supported a federal state with autonomy for the provinces, but some wanted to emulate the unitary model of the French First Republic with a strong central government. A compromised constitution was rejected by the electorate in August 1797.

On 22 January 1798, a coup d'état was carried out by those favouring a unitary state with the support of the French, who were dissatisfied with the referendum result and prolonged debates. The remaining members of the National Assembly finished drafting the Constitution for the Batavian People two months later, and it was adopted by referendum on 23 April 1798 with an overwhelming majority. Only those who swore allegiance to the coup were allowed to vote.
