= Exercitiegenootschap =

1700s Dutch militia

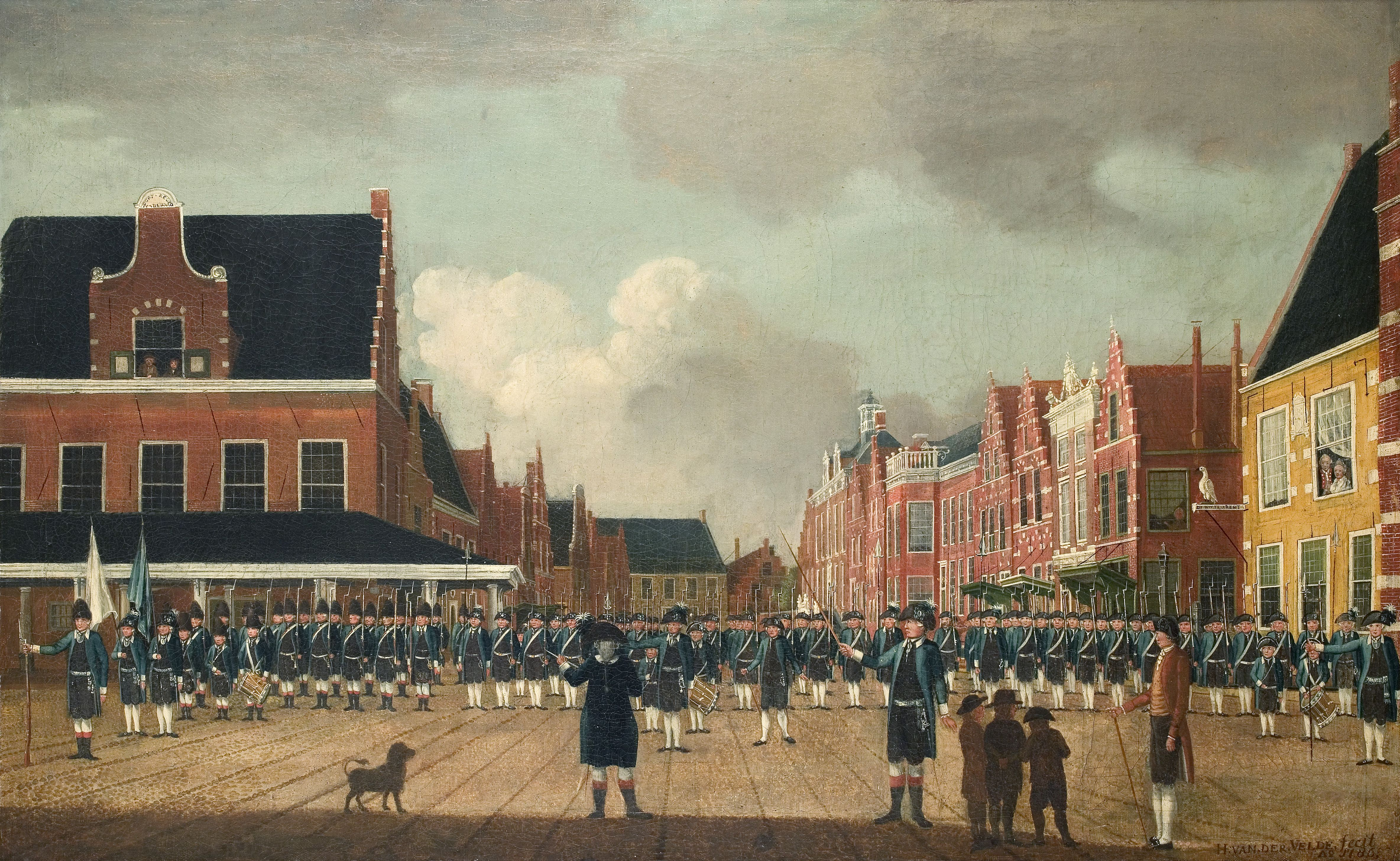
1786 painting of the exercitiegenootschap of Sneek

An exercitiegenootschap (Dutch pronunciation: [ɛksərˈsitsi.ɣəˌnoːtsxɑp], exercise company) or militia was a military organisation in the 18th century Netherlands, in the form of an armed private organization with a democratically chosen administration, aiming to train the citizens and the lower bourgeoisie in use of muskets. Exercitiegenootschappen were propagated by Joan Derk van der Capellen tot den Pol, who translated an old book (1732) by Andrew Fletcher on arming a nation's citizens and so got the idea from Scotland. He also saw them as necessary due to the serious decline in the existing, Orangist schutterijen.

== Cause and context ==
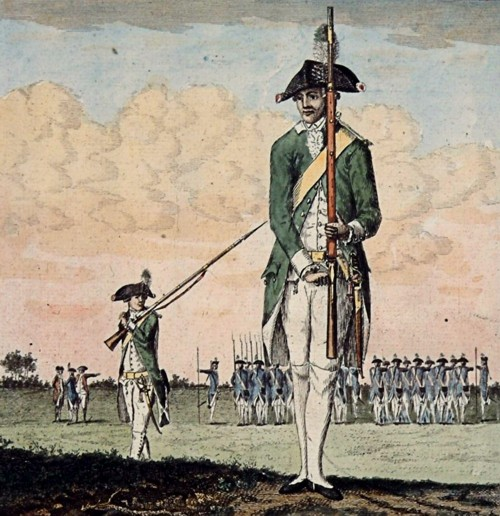
An exercitiegenootschap in 1783

Exercitiegenootschappen were set up after the Scottish, American and Swiss examples of musket-armed citizens. The expenses of a standing army, the attracting of foreign officers into the Dutch States Army and the neglect of the Dutch Admiralties were all loudly criticised and reform was called for. The leaders of the Patriots tried to seek a solution during the Fourth Anglo-Dutch War, at the cheapest possible cost. Immediately the war (which had begun badly) developed disastrously, a wave of deprivation spreading through the country, and this result of the attempted reform was widely felt as a matter of national shame, with the harrowing contrast between the famous past and the miserable present becoming clear to everyone.

== Organisation and structure ==
The first exercitiegenootschappen were set up in the beginning of 1783 in Deventer, Dordrecht, and Utrecht. Further in Leiden, Edam, Woerden, Enkhuizen, Gouda, Hoogkarspel, Amsterdam, Weesp, Rotterdam, Schiedam, Heusden, Westzaan.

Quint Ondaatje was the leader of the exercitiegenootschap in Utrecht, and he soon spoke in deeds as well as words. He knew that the exercitiegenootschappen had to be organized firstly at provincial (and later at national) levels. In 1784 a number of nationally organized free-corps (vrijcorpsen) signed the Acte van Verbintenis (Act of Agreement), in which they promised to come to the aid of each other as the Patriots saw necessary. This Act especially stimulated the exercitiegenootschappen and vrijcorpsen in the small cities to confidence and action. Gerrit Paape set himself the task of being a historian of these local societies.

Many people wanted to become a member, with Catholics and Mennonites no longer excluded. Not only many shopkeepers, but also ministers, such as François Adriaans van der Kemp, reported for duty. They exercised at least once a week, mostly on Sundays after the religious service or, in bad weather, actually inside the church. (There were almost no chairs, but a few benches for the nobility and members of the vroedschap). Members never needed to be wealthy enough to buy their own weapon, unlike in the schutterijen. Non-attendance earned a fine of a few stuivers.

Exercitiegenootschappen had the preference above free corps, being completely independent of the existing schutterij. "Vrijcorpsen" arose mainly in the countryside, because there was no schutterij for their area. After the Rotterdam exercitiegenootschap in 1784 was forbidden, more and more so-called "genootschappen in de wapenhandel" (societies for weapons training) sprang up, as in Bolsward, and they were very progressive for their time and would speak out regularly.

- In 1784: Purmerend, Huizen, Alblasserdam, Buiksloot, Hoorn, Rijnsburg, Schoonhoven, Alkmaar.
- In 1785: Papendrecht, Delft, Rotterdam, Gouderak en Nieuwland.
- in 1786: Boskoop, Den Haag, Giessen, Gorinchem, Haastrecht, Oudewater, Hellevoetsluis, Hillegom, Oud-Beyerland, Vianen, Vlaardingen, Voorburg, Maassluis, Bodegraven en Wormerveer.

In 1787 about 25 new free corps or "societies in weapon training" were erected, but also the orangists organized themselves better.

== Escalation ==
A brief Dutch conflict with Joseph II, Holy Roman Emperor over the Scheldt, known as the Kettle War - for two hundred years closed off by Holland and Zeeland - led to organization of the provincial armies in January 1785. Court Lambertus of Beyma took the initiative in Friesland, causing a wave of new exercitiegenootschappen and free-corps that spring. The Provincial States reached an understanding in their regulations. In the regulations of the exercitiegenootschappen, their underlying aim of bringing the people republican principles and petitioning for and demanding their participation in choosing the composition of the city administration had never been taken up.

Initial support, however, turned into a discouraging administration in the summer of 1785, with the aristocrats moving more and more towards the prince. At the beginning of August 1786 in Utrecht, the exercitiegenootschappen gathered together to commemorate the Battle of Dogger Bank, with 20,000 men marching through the city. At that meeting, a radical decision was taken: sixteen democratically chosen Patriots were appointed to the council. This was a unique event in Europe. A few weeks later Herman Willem Daendels, captain of the local exercitiegenootschap, was inspired to take action in Hattem, upon which all exercitiegenootschappen meetings and mutual support were banned in Friesland and Gelderland. Freedom of assembly had reached its limits. Moreover, it was a war in propaganda.

In May 1787, the professors and students in Franeker were forbidden from joining the local exercitiegenootschappen or militia. Near Zeist, east of Utrecht, the Dutch States Army camped; there were several shootings Vreeswijk and Soestdijk, but not very many people were hurt. In June 1787, the Rhinegrave of Salm was appointed in Utrecht to organize the city defense; a Commission of Defense was installed in Woerden. Not long after the officers of the Gouda exercitiegenootschap stopped princess Wilhelmina of Prussia, at the Vlist and sent back to Nijmegen. A flying column under Adam Gerard Mappa occupied a number of cities in Holland, and another did the same in Friesland. They tried to take the election of burgomasters and the member of the city councils into their own hands, shortly before Charles William Ferdinand, Duke of Brunswick the commander of the troops of king of Prussia occupied the Republic, on 13 September. The Orange restoration became established, with its superior force of 20.000 soldiers. Stadholder William V was returned to his position. All the officers of the exercitiegenootschappen who had not already escaped to northern France (Pas-de-Calais) were captured and condemned, if they had been involved in an exercitiegenootschap or defense commission.

== Bibliography ==
- Klein, S.R.E. (1995) Patriots Republikanisme. Politieke cultuur in Nederland (1766–1787).
- Verweij, G. (1996) Geschiedenis van Nederland. Levensverhaal van zijn bevolking.
