= National Assembly =

Section of a legislature

In politics, a national assembly is either a unicameral legislature, the lower house (Note: Nepal and Tajikistan being the exception, with their National Assembly as the higher houses of bicameral Parliament) of a bicameral legislature, or both houses of a bicameral legislature together. In the English language it generally means "an assembly composed of the representatives of the nation." The population base represented by this name is manifestly the nation as a whole, as opposed to a geographically select population, such as that represented by a provincial assembly. The powers of a national assembly vary according to the type of government. It may possess all the powers of government, generally governing by committee, or it may function solely within the legislative branch of the government.

The name also must be distinguished from the concept. Conceptually such an institution may appear under variety of names, especially if "national assembly" is being used to translate foreign names of the same concept into English. Also, the degree to which the National Assembly speaks for the nation is a variable. To achieve a quorum, the ancient Athenian Assembly employed Scythian police to arrest citizens at random from the street. On the other hand, the early Parliaments of Europe were mainly of an aristocratic composition. The word had its origins and inspirations from the National Assembly that was responsible for drafting a constitution during the French Revolution.

The exact words, "national assembly," have been used prolifically in the international community of nations since the 18th and 19th centuries, considered the Age of Revolution in western Europe. Nations that formed republics in this age subsequently formed empires. Extensive cross-cultural influences brought much of their language and institutions to the provinces. When these empires collapsed finally, the emancipated countries formed states and other institutions on the model of the former imperial nations. Some examples of international influences are as follows:

In Germany, a Nationalversammlung was elected following the revolutions of 1848–1849 and 1918–1919, to be replaced by a permanent Diet (Reichstag) later. The legislature of the Estado Novo regime in Portugal was known as the National Assembly. The national assembly was also defined in the Republic of China constitution. This is different from the Legislative Yuan by the ROC constitution. In 2005, Taiwan revised the constitution and the national assembly was abolished. Examples have multiplied greatly under the policy of self-determination adopted by the western nations. Many more are to be found in the articles listed below.

== Origin of the expression ==
Perhaps the best known National Assembly was that established during the French Revolution in 1789, known as the Assemblée nationale. Consequently, the name is particularly common in Francophone countries. It was also the name of the legislature during France's Second Republic and the Third Republic, and since 1946 has been the lower house of the French parliament, first under the Fourth Republic, and from 1958, the Fifth Republic.

The expression, however, did not originate in 1789. It was already in use in the French language of the times. Louis XIII (1601–1643), par la grace de Dieu Roy de France & de Navarre, in a Declaration of April 14, 1627, concerning the sovereignty of his kingdom, prohibits ministers of foreign countries from any jurisdiction in France, citing, as precedent, his Lettres de Declaration of April 17, 1623, forbidding religious officials from treating with foreign countries. He describes his Declaration as ordonné qu'en Assemblées Provinciales & Nationales des nosdites sujets. This was the "registration" that the Parlement of Paris refused to perform for Louis XVI in 1787–1788. When the Estates-General of 1789 formed the National Assembly of 1789, they did not believe they were instituting anything new. In the Assembly of Notables of 1787, Gilbert du Motier, Marquis de Lafayette had used National Assembly and Estates General synonymously when he suggested that France needed a national assembly to solve its financial problems.

National Assembly is also found in some Commonwealth countries. Its use there is not a translation of Assemblée nationale, as the phrase is equally embedded in the English language. For example, at the end of the First English Civil War, an Act of Parliament, 1648, "Concerning the Members of the Classical and Congregational Presbyteries, in the several counties of the Kingdom of England, and Dominion of Wales," establishes a national congregational church in England and Wales, corresponding to the presbyteries of Scotland. The language is: "The National Assembly shall be constituted of members chosen by and sent from the several Provincial Assemblies." This National Assembly appears to have no direct link to any French words, although the concept is the same.

== Unicameral national legislatures ==
Country	Article	Local name
Angola	National Assembly of Angola	Assembleia Nacional
Armenia	National Assembly of Armenia	Ազգային Ժողով (Azgayin Zhoghov)
Azerbaijan	National Assembly of Azerbaijan	Milli Məclis
Benin	National Assembly of Benin	Assemblée nationale
Bhutan	National Assembly of Bhutan	རྒྱལ་ཡོངས་ཚོགས་འདུ་ (Gyelyong Tshogdu)
Botswana	National Assembly of Botswana	
Bulgaria	National Assembly of Bulgaria	Народно събрание (Narodno Sǎbranie)
Burkina Faso	National Assembly of Burkina Faso	Assemblée nationale
Cape Verde	National Assembly of Cape Verde	Assembleia Nacional
Central African Republic	National Assembly of the Central African Republic	Assemblée nationale
Chad	National Assembly of Chad	Assemblée nationale
Cuba	National Assembly of People's Power	Asamblea Nacional del Poder Popular
Djibouti	National Assembly of Djibouti	Assemblée nationale
Ecuador	National Assembly of Ecuador	Asamblea Nacional
Eritrea	National Assembly of Eritrea	ሃገራዊ ባይቶ (Hagerawi Baito)
Gambia	National Assembly of Gambia	
Guinea	National Assembly of Guinea	Assemblée nationale
Guinea-Bissau	National People's Assembly of Guinea-Bissau	Assembleia Nacional Popular da Guiné-Bissau
Guyana	National Assembly of Guyana	
Hungary	National Assembly of Hungary	Országgyűlés
Ivory Coast	National Assembly of Ivory Coast	Assemblée nationale
Kuwait	National Assembly of Kuwait	مجلس الامة (Majlis al-ʾUmma al-Kuwaytiyy)
Laos	National Assembly of Laos	ສະພາແຫ່ງຊາດ (Sapha Aehngsad)
Malawi	National Assembly of Malawi	
Mali	National Assembly of Mali	Assemblée nationale
Mauritius	National Assembly of Mauritius	Assemblée nationale
Nicaragua	National Assembly of Nicaragua	Asamblea Nacional
Niger	National Assembly of Niger	Assemblée nationale
North Korea	Supreme People's Assembly	최고인민회의 (Choego Inmin Hoe-ui)
Panama	National Assembly of Panama	Asamblea Nacional de Panamá
Saint Kitts and Nevis	National Assembly of Saint Kitts and Nevis	
São Tomé and Príncipe	National Assembly of São Tomé and Príncipe	Assembleia Nacional
Senegal	National Assembly of Senegal	Assemblée nationale
Serbia	National Assembly of Serbia	Народна скупштина Србије (Narodna skupština Srbije)
Seychelles	National Assembly of Seychelles	Lasanble Nasyonal
South Korea	National Assembly (South Korea)	국회 (Gukhoe)
Sudan	National Assembly of Sudan	المجلس الوطني السوداني (Al-Maǧlis al-Waṭaniy)
Suriname	National Assembly of Suriname	Nationale Assemblée
Tanzania	National Assembly of Tanzania	Bunge la Tanzania
Togo	National Assembly of Togo	Assemblée nationale
Turkey	Grand National Assembly of Turkey	Türkiye Büyük Millet Meclisi
Venezuela	National Assembly of Venezuela	Asamblea Nacional
Vietnam	National Assembly of the Socialist Republic of Vietnam	Quốc hội nước Cộng hòa xã hội chủ nghĩa Việt Nam
Zambia	National Assembly of Zambia	

== Lower house of bicameral national legislature ==
Country	Article	Local name
Algeria	People's National Assembly	al-Majlis al-Sha'abi al-Watani (Arabic: المجلس الشعبي الوطني)/Asqamu Aɣerfan Aɣelnaw (Berber)/Assemblée populaire nationale (French)
Bhutan	National Assembly of Bhutan	འབྲུག་གི་རྒྱལ་ཡོངས་ཚོགས་འདུ་ (Druk gi gyel yong tshok du)
Burundi	National Assembly of Burundi	Assemblée nationale
Cambodia	National Assembly of Cambodia	រដ្ឋសភាកម្ពុជា (Rodsaphea)
Cameroon	National Assembly of Cameroon	Assemblée nationale
Democratic Republic of the Congo	National Assembly of the Democratic Republic of the Congo	Assemblée nationale
Republic of the Congo	National Assembly of the Republic of the Congo	Assemblée nationale
France	National Assembly of France	Assemblée nationale
Republic of Ireland	Assembly of Ireland	Dáil Éireann
Ivory Coast	National Assembly of Ivory Coast	Assemblée nationale
Kenya	National Assembly of Kenya	
Gabon	National Assembly of Gabon	Assemblée nationale
Lesotho	National Assembly of Lesotho	Lekhotleng la Sechaba
Madagascar	National Assembly of Madagascar	Antenimieram-Pirenena
Mauritania	National Assembly	الجمعية الوطنية (Arabic)/Assemblée nationale (French)
Namibia	National Assembly of Namibia	
Pakistan	National Assembly of Pakistan	ایوانِ زیریں (Aiwān-e-Zairīñ)/قومی اسمبلی (Qọ̄mī Assembly)
Slovenia	National Assembly of Slovenia	Državni zbor
South Africa	National Assembly of South Africa	

== Upper house of bicameral national legislature ==
Country	Article	Local name
Tajikistan	National Assembly of Tajikistan	Majlisi Milliy
Nepal	National Assembly of Nepal	Rāṣṭriya sabhā

== Entire bicameral legislature ==
In such cases, the individual lower or upper houses have a name other than "assembly".

Country	Article	Local name
Bahrain	National Assembly of Bahrain	المجلس الوطني البحريني (al-Majlis al-Watani)
Belarus	National Assembly of Belarus	Nacyjanalny schod Respubliki Bielaruś (Belarusian: Нацыянальны сход) / Natsionalnoye sobran'ye Respubliki Belarus' (Russian: Национальное собрание)
Belize	National Assembly of Belize	
Haiti	National Assembly of Haiti	Assemblée nationale
Nigeria	National Assembly of Nigeria	
Poland	National Assembly	Zgromadzenie Narodowe
Russia	Federal Assembly of the Russian Federation	Федеральное Собрание (Federalnoye Sobraniye)
Switzerland	Federal Assembly of the Swiss Confederation	Bundesversammlung (German) / Assemblée fédérale (French) / Assemblea federale (Italian) / Assamblea federala (Romansh)
Thailand	National Assembly of Thailand	รัฐสภา (Ratthasapha)

== Historical ==
Country/Territory	Name		Period	Notes
Afghanistan	National Assembly of Afghanistan	ملی شورا (Pashto: Mili Shura) / شورای (Dari: Shura-e Milli)	2004–2019	Dissolved by the Taliban
Batavian Republic, Netherlands	National Assembly of the Batavian Republic: First National Assembly; Second National Assembly		1 March 1796 – 31 August 1797; 1 September 1797 – 22 January 1798 (coup)	
Republic of China	National Assembly (Beiyang government); National Assembly of the Republic of China		1913 – 1925; 1947 – 2005	Congress (Beiyang); Defunct constitutional convention
Estonia	Rahvuskogu		1937	Constituent assembly
Germany (Weimar Republic)	Weimar National Assembly		1919 – 1920	
Iraq	National Assembly of Iraq		2004 – 2005	A constitutional convention
Nepal	National Assembly of Nepal		1990 – 1997	
Philippines	National Assembly of Representatives; National Assembly of the Philippines; National Assembly of the Second Philippine Republic		1898 – 1899; 1935 – 1941; 25 September 1943 – 2 February 1944	
Portugal	National Assembly of Portugal		1933 – 1974	During Estado Novo dictatorship
Wales	National Assembly for Wales	Cynulliad Cenedlaethol Cymru	July 1, 1999 – May 6, 2020	Can make Acts of the Assembly and Delegated legislation; The title 'National Assembly' was formerly used to refer to the Welsh devolved unicameral legislature until 6 May 2020, when it was renamed to a parliament, "the Welsh Parliament" or the direct Welsh translation "Senedd Cymru" (simply as Senedd)

== Other ==
Country/Territory	Name	Local name	Notes
Northern Ireland	Northern Ireland Assembly	Tionól Thuaisceart Éireann	Can make Acts of the Assembly and Delegated legislation
Quebec, Canada	National Assembly of Quebec	Assemblée nationale du Québec	A unicameral provincial legislative assembly
Republika Srpska	National Assembly (Republika Srpska)	Народна скупштина Републике Српске (Narodna Skupština Republike Srpske)	Autonomous entity of Bosnia and Herzegovina.

== See also ==
- List of national legislatures
