= Gerard Bacot =

Dutch politician (1743–1822)

Gerard Jacob George Bacot
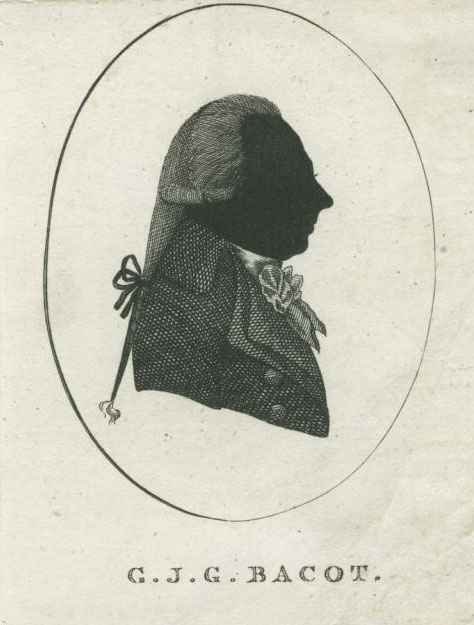

Member of the First National Assembly of the Batavian Republic
- In office 1 March 1796 – 31 August 1797
- Constituency: Onderdendam

Member of the Second National Assembly of the Batavian Republic
- In office 1 September 1797 – 22 January 1798
- Constituency: Onderdendam

Member of the Representative Body of the Batavian Republic
- In office 31 July 1798 – 29 July 1800
- Constituency: Onderdendam
- In office 29 July 1800 – 17 October 1801
- Constituency: Zuidhorn

Personal details
- Born: 8 March 1743 Doornik
- Died: 14 March 1822 (aged 79) The Hague

Gerard Jacob George Bacot (8 March 1743 – 14 March 1822) was a Dutch politician, poet and judge.

== Early life ==
Bacot was born in Doornik, he was the son of Daniel Schaffer Bacot and Anna Aurelia van der Uijl. Bacot studied at the University of Groningen, where he earned a doctorate in philosophy in 1768 and later in law in 1797. Bacot was a minister in Eenrum between 1770 and 1787. He gained recognition as a philosopher with the publication of De zedelijke natuur in verband met de burgerlijke maatschappij door Een mensch in 1770. He also wrote several award-winning poems published by the Leiden society 'Kunst wordt door arbeid verkregen', including s Mensche plicht and Gods wijsheid in zijne werken.

== Exile ==
Bacot was an active Patriot. Under the pseudonym Justus Volkshart, he authored an open letter. He was suspected of drafting a petition criticizing the princely court and was among candidates considered for negotiating an alliance with France. After the Prussian invasion of Holland in 1787, he fled to Burgsteinfurt. There he taught the children of the count in the Burgsteinfurt Castle. In 1789, he moved to Dunkirk where he became minister for protestant congregation for other exiles.

== Return ==
After the Batavian Revolution in 1795, he returned to the Netherlands. He became a member of the Provisional Representatives of the Ommelanden and a member of the States General of the Batavian Republic on behalf of the district Groningen. In October 1795, he was appointed judge in the Court of Justice in Groningen.

For the district of Ommelanden, he was elected to the First and Second National Assembly. In the Assembly, he was member of the committee for drafting a plan for national education. In the Assembly, he remained independent, aligning with neither the Republicans nor the moderates. He was considered a federalist. After the coup d'état of 22 January 1798, he swore the oath against federalism, but nevertheless did not join the Constituent Assembly, which replaced the National Assembly.

After leaving the Assembly, he returned to Groningen where he became judge again. He was briefly fired in April 1798 by the Uitvoerend Bewind, but was reinstated when a moderate Uitvoerend Bewind came to power. Later that year, he elected member of the Representative Body, which replaced the Constituent Assembly.

After the Incorporation of the Netherlands by France, Bacot was appointed member of the Imperial Court of Justice in The Hague. After the Netherlands became independent again in 1813, he was appointed in the Supreme Court of the Netherlands. He remained judge until his death in 1822.

== Personal life ==
Bacot married Abelina Johanna Entrup in 1771 and divorced her in 1776. Bacot had no children. He was part of the Dutch Reformed Church.

His literary works, including poems and philosophical essays, were collected and published in Wijsgerige en dichtlievende mengelstoffen in 1811.
