= First National Assembly of the Batavian Republic =

Legislative term

First National Assembly
Second	→
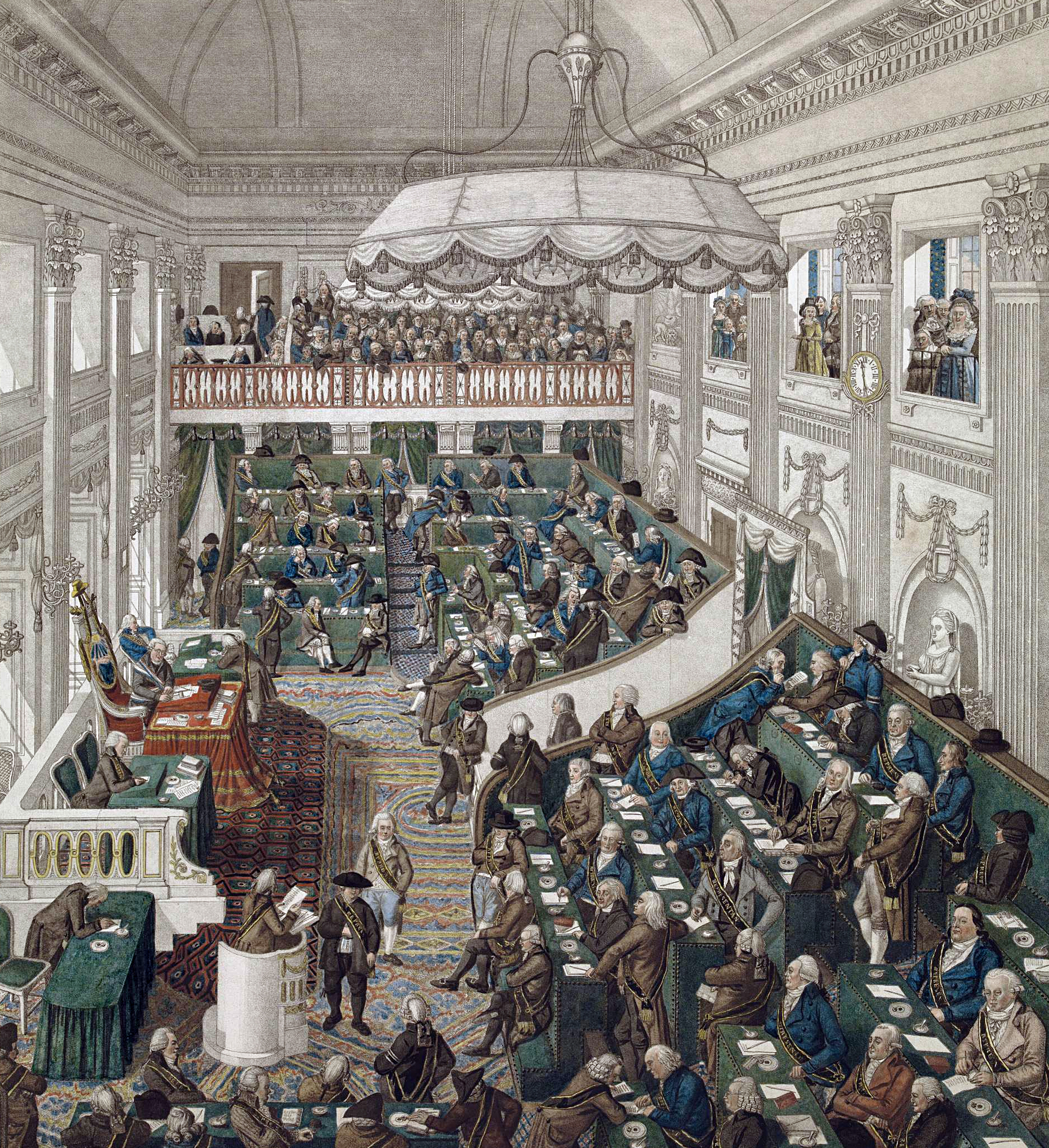
- The assembly's first session on 1 March 1796

Overview
- Meeting place: Oude Zaal, Binnenhof, The Hague
- Term: 1 March 1796 – 31 August 1797
- Election: 1796 Batavian general election

The First National Assembly (Dutch: Eerste Nationale Vergadering) was the term between 1796 and 1797 of the National Assembly of the Batavian Republic. The First National Assembly was elected in the 1796 Batavian general election. The assembly was responsible for governing the new republic as well as writing a constitution. It was replaced by the Second National Assembly after the 1797 Batavian general election.

== Members ==
Members of the First National Assembly
Name	Begin date	End date	Electoral district	Ref.
Theodorus Aaninck	1 March 1796	31 August 1797	Amsterdam IV	
Hector Livius van Altena	11 April 1796	31 August 1797	Leeuwarderadeel	
Joan Bernard Auffmorth	11 March 1796	31 August 1797	Goor	
Jacobus Egmondt Austen	22 April 1796	31 August 1797	Middelburg B	
Gerard Bacot	1 March 1796	31 August 1797	Onderdendam	
Wilhelmus Theodorus van Bennekom	22 July 1796	31 August 1797	Doesburg	
Tammo Adriaan ten Berge	1 March 1796	31 August 1797	Groningen II	
Willem Hendrik Teding van Berkhout	1 March 1796	31 August 1797	Delft	
Augustijn Gerhard Besier	1 May 1796	10 November 1797	Zwolle	
Willem Aernout de Beveren	14 April 1796	31 August 1797	Middelburg A	
Eduard Marius van Beyma	23 December 1796	31 August 1797	Dokkum	
Coert Lambertus van Beyma thoe Kingma	17 June 1796	31 August 1797	Ferwerd	
Jan Bernd Bicker	1 March 1796	31 August 1797	Polanen	
Bernardus Blok	1 March 1796	31 August 1797	Enkhuizen	
Dirk Boellaard	1 March 1796	31 August 1797	Sliedrecht-Geertruidenberg	
Derk Sebes Bonthuis	2 April 1796	10 November 1796	Appingedam	
Johannes Petrus van der Borght	1 March 1796	31 August 1797	Breda	
Hermanus Borgrink	6 April 1796	31 August 1797	Leeuwarden	
Bernardus Bosch	1 March 1796	31 August 1797	Medemblik	
Paulus Bosveld	1 March 1796	31 August 1797	Dordrecht	
Johannes Josephus Brands	1 March 1796	31 August 1797	Rotterdam III	
Cornelis Ignatius Branger	1 March 1796	31 August 1797	Amsterdam VI	
François Breekpot	27 June 1796	31 August 1797	Kortgene	
Jacob Jan Cambier	29 March 1796	10 November 1796	Gorinchem	
Steven Camp	29 March 1796	10 November 1796	Zeist	
Hendrik van Castrop	1 March 1796	31 August 1797	Amsterdam III	
Hermanus ten Cate	1 March 1796	31 August 1797	Zuidhorn	
Jan Jacob Cau	1 March 1796	31 August 1797	The Hague III	
Hendrik Jan Colmschate	1 March 1796	31 August 1797	Almelo	
Jan Couperus	1 March 1796	13 August 1797	Gouda	
Paulus Emanuel Antonius de la Court	1 March 1796	13 August 1797	Zaltbommel	
Wilhelmus Christianus de Crane	24 March 1796	31 August 1797	Zierikzee	
Jan Pieter van Wickevoort Crommelin	1 March 1796	31 August 1797	Amsterdam IX	
Lambert Engelbert van Eck	12 December 1796	31 August 1797	The Hague II	
Jan Willem Evers	1 March 1796	13 August 1797	Arnhem	
Johan Pieter Farret	1 March 1796	31 August 1797	Amsterdam X	
Jacob Hendrik Floh	1 March 1796	31 August 1797	Hengelo	
Johan Geelvinck	25 April 1796	10 November 1796	Amsterdam X	
Hugo Gevers	11 April 1796	31 August 1797	The Hague I	
Oene Gerrits Gorter Gorter	20 April 1796	31 August 1797	Oosterwierum	
Joan Michaël de Graaff	14 April 1796	27 July 1796	The Hague II	
Egbert Johan Greve	1 March 1796	31 August 1797	Bredevoort	
Willem Gerard van der Grijp	9 May 1796	10 November 1796	Goes	
Stefanus van Gulick	1 March 1796	31 August 1797	Oirschot	
Petrus Franciscus Guljé	1 March 1796	31 August 1797	Veghel	
Antony Coenraad Willem van Haersolte	29 April 1796	10 November 1796	Kampen	
Johan Willem Simon van Haersolte	1 March 1796	31 August 1797	Elst	
Jacob George Hieronymus Hahn	1 March 1796	31 August 1797	Den Helder	
Tjeerd Halbes	29 April 1796	31 August 1797	Balk	
IJsbrand van Hamelsveld	1 March 1796	31 August 1797	Hoorn	
Paulus Hartog	1 March 1796	31 August 1797	Rotterdam IV	
Johannes Josephus Havermans	1 March 1796	31 August 1797	Etten	
Godefriedus Dominicus van Hellenberg	1 March 1796	31 August 1797	Druten	
Michaël Helmich	1 March 1796	31 August 1797	Raalte	
Hendrik Jacob van Hengst	19 April 1796	10 November 1796	Utrecht I	
Bernardus Wilhelmus Hoffman	1 March 1796	31 August 1797	Appingedam	
Joannes Franciscus Rudolphus van Hooff	1 March 1796	31 August 1797	Leende	
Herman Hoogewal	1 March 1796	31 August 1797	Amsterdam VIII	
Hendrik Daniël van Hoorn	1 March 1796	31 August 1797	Amsterdam XIII	
Diderik van Horbag	1 March 1796	10 November 1797	Schoonhoven	
Johannes Lambertus Huber	12 December 1796	31 August 1797	Harlingen	
Willem Pieter Hubert	1 March 1796	31 August 1797	's-Hertogenbosch	
Godefridus Franciscus Antonius Henricus Cornelius van Hugenpoth tot Aerdt	8 July 1796	31 August 1797	Nijmegen	
Teunis Izaäks Hulshoff	1 March 1796	31 August 1797	Groningen I	
Jacobus Janssen	6 June 1796	31 August 1797	Middelharnis	
Gerrit David Jordens	1 March 1796	31 August 1797	Hattem	
Jacobus Kantelaar	29 March 1796	10 November 1796	Lochem	
Pieter Leonard van de Kasteele	1 March 1796	31 August 1797	Leiden I	
Johannes van Kempen	11 April 1796	10 November 1796	Schoonhoven	
Ludovicus Timon de Kempenaer	1 March 1796	31 August 1797	Alkmaar	
Theodorus Bernardus Kock	29 March 1796	31 August 1797	Oldenzaal	
Joseph Koene	1 March 1796	31 August 1797	Geertruidenberg	
Joannis Alexander Krieger	1 March 1796	31 August 1797	Grave	
Dirk Cornelis Kuiken	19 April 1796	31 August 1797	Berlikum	
Gerardus Wilhelmus Josephus van Lamsweerde	1 March 1796	31 August 1797	Doetinchem	
Johan Herman de Lange	1 March 1796	31 August 1797	Oost-Zaandam	
Stefanus Jacobus van Langen	30 May 1796	31 August 1797	Noordwijk	
Daniël Cornelis de Leeuw	1 March 1796	31 August 1797	Soestdijk	
Johannes Diederik van Leeuwen	1 March 1796	31 August 1797	Tiel	
Cornelis van Lennep	1 March 1796	31 August 1797	Amsterdam I	
Estienne Lespinasse	23 June 1796	31 August 1797	Amsterdam XII	
Willem Anne Lestevenon	1 March 1796	31 August 1797	Haarlem	
Franciscus Josephus van Lilaar	24 May 1796	31 August 1797	Montfoort	
Johannes Bernardus van Loenen	24 May 1796	31 August 1797	Wolvega	
Johannes van Lokhorst	30 May 1796	31 August 1797	Brielle	
Johannes Lublink de Jonge	11 April 1796	10 November 1796	Weesp	
Johannes Gerardus Luyken	1 March 1796	31 August 1797	Weesp	
Jacobus Adriaansz. van Manen	1 March 1796	31 August 1797	Zeist	
Gerard Willem van Marle	1 March 1796	31 August 1797	Kampen	
Eisso Metelerkamp	31 March 1796	10 November 1796	Veendam	
Melchior Joachim de Meuse	19 April 1796	10 November 1796	Grave	
Jan Hendrik Meyer	1 March 1796	31 August 1797	Amsterdam XI	
Johannes Henricus Midderigh	1 March 1796	31 August 1797	Rotterdam I	
Jacob Abraham Uitenhage de Mist	17 May 1796	31 August 1797	Deventer	
Tonco Modderman	29 April 1796	10 November 1796	Meppel	
Arnoldus Molengraaff	1 March 1796	31 August 1797	Oisterwijk	
Bernardus Nieuhoff	3 March 1796	31 August 1797	Barneveld	
Jacobus Jzn. Nolet	1 March 1796	31 August 1797	Schiedam	
Jan Christiaan ten Oever	18 April 1796	10 November 1796	Bodegraven	
Nicolaas Jan Okhuysen	1 March 1796	31 August 1797	Nieuwerkerk	
Jan David Pasteur	1 March 1796	31 August 1797	Strijen	
Pieter Paulus	1 March 1796	17 March 1796	The Hague I	
Petrus Mattheus Pertat	11 July 1796	31 August 1797	Leiden II	
Adrianus Ploos van Amstel	1 March 1796	31 August 1797	Amstelveen	
Abraham Pompe van Meerdervoort	1 March 1796	31 August 1797	Ridderkerk	
Jan Proot	1 March 1796	31 August 1797	Hazerswoude	
Henry Louis Quesnel	1 March 1796	31 August 1797	Wateringen	
Willem Queysen	1 March 1796	31 August 1797	Zwolle	
Henri Rabinel	29 March 1796	31 August 1797	Goes	
Christianus Norbertus Reyns	12 April 1796	16 July 1797	Steenbergen-Bergen op Zoom	
Cornelis Wilhelmus de Rhoer	1 March 1796	31 August 1797	Harderwijk	
Johannes Wilhelmus van Rijswijk	27 May 1796	10 November 1796	Sneek	
Simon Schermer	1 March 1796	31 August 1797	Purmerend	
Rutger Jan Schimmelpenninck	1 March 1796	31 August 1797	Amsterdam XIV	
Taco Schonegevel	6 April 1796	31 August 1797	Drachten	
Meinardus Siderius	6 April 1796	31 August 1797	Wolvega	
Albert Johan de Sitter	1 March 1796	31 August 1797	Winschoten	
Johannes Slootmans	3 August 1797	31 August 1797	Steenbergen-Bergen op Zoom	
Jan Carel Smissaert	29 July 1796	10 November 1796	Harderwijk	
Nicolaas van Staphorst	31 March 1796	31 August 1797	Amsterdam VII	
Simon Stijl	25 April 1796	31 August 1796	Sneek	
Jan Hendrik Stoffenberg	14 March 1796	31 August 1797	Buren-Culemborg	
Andries Jan Strick van Linschoten	1 March 1796	31 August 1797	Utrecht I	
Henricus Sypkens	7 March 1796	31 August 1797	Scheemda	
Willem Bruigom Tip	1 March 1796	31 August 1797	West-Zaandam	
Joachimus Lunsingh Tonckens	1 March 1796	31 August 1797	Vries	
Scato Trip	1 March 1796	31 August 1797	Veendam	
Johan Valckenaer	1 March 1796	27 May 1796	Leiden II	
Gerrit Carel Coenraad Vatebender	5 April 1796	10 November 1796	Gouda	
Henricus Verhagen	1 April 1796	10 November 1796	Helmond	
Hendrik Verhees	1 March 1796	31 August 1797	Oss	
Johannes Baptista Verheyen	19 October 1796	31 August 1797	Tilburg	
Petrus Verhoysen	1 March 1797	31 August 1797	Helmond	
Abraham Verster	1 March 1796	31 August 1797	Amsterdam II	
Gerardus Anthony Visscher	1 March 1796	31 August 1797	Utrecht II	
Herman Hendrik Vitringa	1 March 1796	31 August 1797	Lochem	
Lambertus Christoffel Vonk	1 March 1796	31 August 1797	Rotterdam II	
Leonardus van der Voort	1 March 1796	31 August 1797	Heusden	
Carel de Vos van Steenwijk	1 March 1796	31 August 1797	Meppel	
Joan Arend de Vos van Steenwijk tot Nijerwal	1 March 1796	31 August 1797	Vollenhove	
Joachim Nuhout van der Veen	1 March 1796	31 August 1797	Beverwijk	
Pieter Vreede	1 March 1796	31 August 1797	Bergen op Zoom	
Berend Wildrik	1 March 1796	31 August 1797	Zutphen	
Michaël Hendrik Witbols	1 March 1796	31 August 1797	Bodegraven	
Joannes Baptist de Witt	31 March 1796	31 August 1797	Eindhoven	
Dirk Wormer	8 April 1796	10 November 1796	Leiden I	
Derk Jan van der Wyck	1 March 1796	31 August 1797	Zweeloo	
Petrus van Zonsbeek	1 March 1796	31 August 1797	Vlaardingen	
Gerard van der Zoo	1 March 1796	31 August 1797	Nieuwersluis	
Ambrosius Justus Zubli	1 March 1796	31 August 1797	Amsterdam V	
