= Theodorus Aaninck =

Dutch physician and politician (1760–1819)

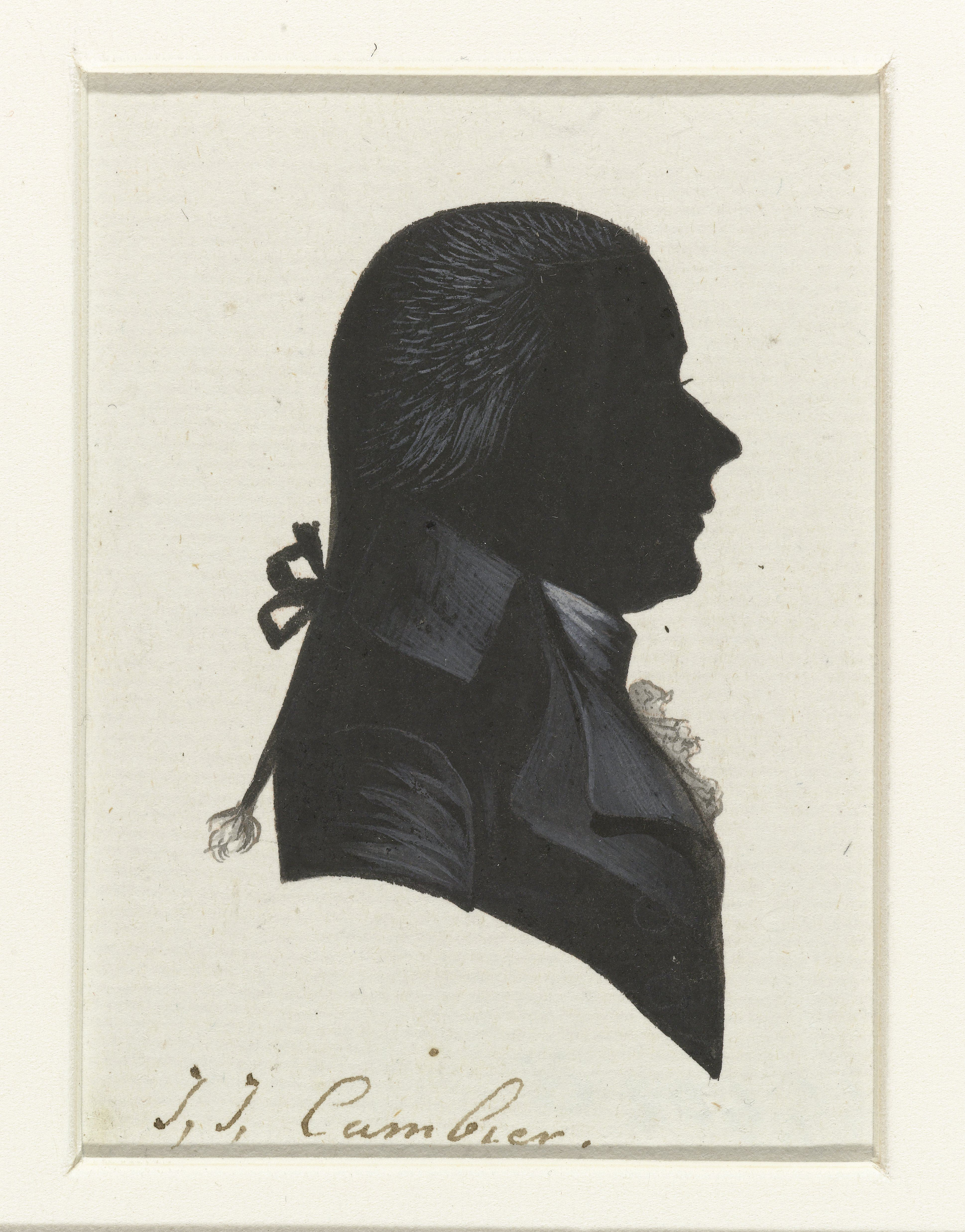

Member of the First National Assembly of the Batavian Republic
- In office 1 March 1796 – 31 August 1797
- Constituency: Amsterdam IV

Member of the Second National Assembly of the Batavian Republic
- In office 28 September 1797 – 22 January 1798
- Constituency: Soestdijk

Personal details
- Born: 7 March 1760 Amsterdam
- Died: 13 March 1819 (aged 59) Haarlem
- Spouse(s): Alida Brouwer (1790-1799); Maria Beukman (from 1802)

Theodorus Aaninck (7 March 1760 – 13 March 1819) was a Dutch physician and politician. He was a member of the National Assembly of the Batavian Republic.

== Early life and education ==
Aaninck was born in Amsterdam. His father was Jacobus Aaninck and his mother Johanna Kalf. He initially pursued his studies in Amsterdam and in Leuven before enrolling at Leiden University on 28 March 1783. He obtained his doctorate in medicine there on 1 May 1784, defending a dissertation titled De purgentibus.

== Political career ==
Aaninck was a supporter of the Patriot movement. On 27 January 1796, he was elected as a member of the National Assembly of the Batavian Republic, representing the electoral district of Amsterdam IV.

On 15 March 1796, he proposed an amendment to a motion regarding the takeover of the old chancery of the States General, seeking to implement cost-cutting measures and to prevent Orangists from retaining employment. On 14 June 1796, he introduced another motion to discharge and immediately suspend 700 artillerymen garrisoned in Amsterdam, some of whom had been involved in riots. Neither proposal was taken up for consideration.

Initially, Aaninck was a follower of the radical priest Pieter Witbols, but over time he adopted a more moderate stance. He was not re-elected on 2 August 1797, but won a by-election on 14 September 1797 for the districts of Soestdijk and Montfoort. A draw determined that he would take his seat for Soestdijk.

Following the coup d'état of 22 January 1798, Aaninck was among the members who resigned in protest, as the regulations to which they had sworn an oath had been abolished. After this, he withdrew from political life.

== Later life ==
Aaninck relocated to Haarlem, where he lived until his death on 13 March 1819.

== Personal life ==
He got engaged on 5 August 1790, to Alida Brouwer (1746–1799). With her, Aaninck had at least one child. After Brouwer's death, Aaninck got engaged again on 13 August 1802, to Maria Beukman (1760–1819). Aaninck was a Roman Catholic.
