= Second National Assembly of the Batavian Republic =

Second National Assembly
←	First National Assembly	Constituent Assembly	→

Overview
- Meeting place: Oude Zaal, Binnenhof, The Hague
- Term: 1 September 1797 – 22 January 1798
- Election: 1797 Batavian general election

The Second National Assembly (Dutch: Tweede Nationale Vergadering) was the term between 1797 and 1798 of the National Assembly of the Batavian Republic. The Second National Assembly was elected in the 1797 Batavian general election. The assembly was responsible for governing the new republic as well as writing a constitution, after the previous proposal was rejected in the 1797 referendum. It was replaced by the Constituent Assembly after the January 1798 coup d'état.

== Members ==
Name	Begin date	End date	Ref.
Theodorus Aaninck	28 September 1797	22 January 1798	
Willem Andries Abbema	10 January 1798	22 January 1798	
Hector Livius van Altena	16 October 1797	22 January 1798	
Gerard Jacob George Bacot	1 September 1797	22 January 1798	
Ale Ales Bakker	9 October 1797	22 January 1798	
Gerard Beljaart	1 September 1797	22 January 1798	
Wilhelmus Theodorus van Bennekom	28 December 1797	22 January 1798	
Arent Julianus Carel de Bère	26 September 1797	22 January 1798	
Arnoldus Anthonius van Berenbroeck	1 September 1797	22 January 1798	
Tammo Adriaan ten Berge	1 September 1797	22 January 1798	
Willem Aernout de Beveren	1 September 1797	22 January 1798	
Eduard Marius van Beyma	1 September 1797	22 January 1798	
Coert Lambertus van Beyma thoe Kingma	1 September 1797	22 January 1798	
Jan Bernd Bicker	1 September 1797	22 January 1798	
Casparus Bijleveld	3 October 1797	22 January 1798	
Jacobus Blaauw	27 November 1797	22 January 1798	
François Blondel	25 September 1797	22 January 1798	
Derk Bodde	8 September 1797	22 January 1798	
Harm Jan van Bolhuis	1 September 1797	22 January 1798	
Derk Sebes Bonthuis	2 October 1797	22 January 1798	
Franciscus Johannes van der Borght	1 September 1797	22 January 1798	
Bernardus Bosch	1 September 1797	22 January 1798	
Johannes Josephus Brands	15 September 1797	22 January 1798	
Cornelis Ignatius Branger	1 September 1797	22 January 1798	
Hermanus Leonardus Bromet	1 September 1797	22 January 1798	
Petrus Brouwer	2 October 1797	22 January 1798	
Bernardus Bruins	1 September 1797	22 January 1798	
Johannes van Buul	1 September 1797	22 January 1798	
Jacob Jan Cambier	1 September 1797	22 January 1798	
Hendrik van Castrop	9 October 1797	22 January 1798	
Hermanus ten Cate	9 October 1797	22 January 1798	
Hendrik Jan Colmschate	4 September 1797	22 January 1798	
Hendrik Costerus	21 September 1797	22 January 1798	
Paulus Emanuel Antonius de la Court	1 September 1797	22 January 1798	
Willebrordus Anthonius Dams	22 January 1798	22 January 1798	
Franciscus Derks	11 September 1797	22 January 1798	
Lambert Engelbert van Eck	17 October 1797	22 January 1798	
Jan van Esen	3 October 1797	22 January 1798	
Jacob Hendrik Floh	9 October 1797	22 January 1798	
Cornelius Floren	1 September 1797	22 January 1798	
Johan Pieter Fokker	1 September 1797	22 January 1798	
Nanning van Foreest	20 November 1797	22 January 1798	
Johannes Fronhoff	1 September 1797	22 January 1798	
Abraham Gevers	1 September 1797	22 January 1798	
Hugo Gevers	1 September 1797	22 January 1798	
Oene Gerrits Gorter Gorter	20 October 1797	22 January 1798	
Johannes Petrus Goudsblom	6 November 1797	22 January 1798	
Franciscus Xaverius Govers	1 September 1797	22 January 1798	
Hendrikus de Wekker de Groot	1 September 1797	22 January 1798	
Petrus Franciscus Guljé	1 September 1797	22 January 1798	
Abraham de Haan	26 October 1797	22 January 1798	
Antony Coenraad Willem van Haersolte	14 November 1797	22 January 1798	
Jacob George Hieronymus Hahn	21 September 1797	22 January 1798	
IJsbrand van Hamelsveld	20 October 1797	22 January 1798	
Johannes Josephus Havermans	1 September 1797	22 January 1798	
Tjaart van Heloma	1 September 1797	17 January 1798	
Cornelis van der Hoeven	13 October 1797	22 January 1798	
Bernardus Wilhelmus Hoffman	1 September 1797	22 January 1798	
Johannes Linthorst Homan	1 September 1797	22 January 1798	
Joannes Franciscus Rudolphus van Hooff	1 September 1797	22 January 1798	
Laurens Hoogendijk	2 October 1797	22 January 1798	
Herman Hoogewal	1 September 1797	22 January 1798	
Cornelis Gijsbertsz. van der Hoop	1 September 1797	22 January 1798	
Diderik van Horbag	1 September 1797	22 January 1798	
Anthony Hoynck van Papendrecht	1 September 1797	22 January 1798	
Ulrich Jan Huber	1 September 1797	22 January 1798	
Godefridus Franciscus Antonius Henricus Cornelius van Hugenpoth tot Aerdt	1 September 1797	22 January 1798	
Carel Gerard Hultman	4 December 1797	22 January 1798	
Adriaan van der Jagt	29 September 1797	22 January 1798	
Jacobus Janssen	1 September 1797	22 January 1798	
Warner de Jonge	1 September 1797	22 January 1798	
Gerrit David Jordens	1 September 1797	22 January 1798	
Jacobus Kantelaar	1 September 1797	22 January 1798	
Pieter Leonard van de Kasteele	1 September 1797	22 January 1798	
Jacob Warmolt Keiser	2 October 1797	22 January 1798	
Reinder van Kleffens	7 September 1797	22 January 1798	
Jan Konijnenburg	1 September 1797	22 January 1798	
Johannes Henricus Kreylkamp	23 November 1797	22 January 1798	
Johan Herman de Lange	1 September 1797	22 January 1798	
Theodorus van Leeuwen	13 October 1797	22 January 1798	
Johannes Diederik van Leeuwen	1 September 1797	22 January 1798	
Hartog Lemon	1 September 1797	22 January 1798	
Cornelis van Lennep	1 September 1797	22 January 1798	
Willem Libotté	1 September 1797	22 January 1798	
Willem de Lille	1 September 1797	22 January 1798	
Willem Gerard Loeff	4 September 1797	22 January 1798	
Johannes van Lokhorst	1 September 1797	22 January 1798	
Johannes Lublink de Jonge	4 September 1797	22 January 1798	
Jacobus Adriaansz. van Manen	1 September 1797	22 January 1798	
Gerard Willem van Marle	1 September 1797	22 January 1798	
Jan Hendrik Meyer	1 September 1797	22 January 1798	
Johannes Henricus Midderigh	6 October 1797	22 January 1798	
Jacob Abraham Uitenhage de Mist	1 September 1797	22 January 1798	
Joan Hendrik Nieuwenhuis	2 October 1797	22 January 1798	
Jacobus Jzn. Nolet	1 September 1797	22 January 1798	
Lambertus Nolst	1 September 1797	22 January 1798	
Willem Anthony Ockerse	1 September 1797	22 January 1798	
Johan Richard van Ommeren	14 September 1797	22 January 1798	
Jurianus Arnoldus Ondorp	2 October 1797	22 January 1798	
Jan Franciscus Pannebakker	23 October 1797	22 January 1798	
Jan David Pasteur	1 September 1797	22 January 1798	
Petrus Mattheus Pertat	1 September 1797	22 January 1798	
Johannes Petrus Pessers	21 September 1797	22 January 1798	
Adrianus Ploos van Amstel	1 September 1797	22 January 1798	
Bernardus ten Poll	4 September 1797	22 January 1798	
Abraham Pompe van Meerdervoort	1 September 1797	22 January 1798	
Jan Proot	1 September 1797	22 January 1798	
Henry Louis Quesnel	1 September 1797	22 January 1798	
Willem Queysen	1 September 1797	22 January 1798	
Henri Rabinel	1 September 1797	22 January 1798	
Frederik Rant	2 October 1797	22 January 1798	
François Adriaan van Rosevelt Cateau	2 October 1797	22 January 1798	
Henricus van Royen	2 October 1797	22 January 1798	
Jacobus Scheltema	1 September 1797	22 January 1798	
Simon Schermer	1 September 1797	22 January 1798	
Abraham Schutte	1 September 1797	23 October 1797	
Albert Johan de Sitter	1 September 1797	22 January 1798	
Petrus de Sonnaville	1 September 1797	22 January 1798	
Johan Albert van der Spijk	1 September 1797	22 January 1798	
Jan Hendrik Stoffenberg	1 September 1797	22 January 1798	
Bernardus Storm	11 December 1797	22 January 1798	
Henricus Sypkens	1 September 1797	22 January 1798	
Jan Willem Tichler	1 September 1797	22 January 1798	
Willem Bruigom Tip	1 September 1797	22 January 1798	
Pieter Toens	1 September 1797	22 January 1798	
Joachim Nuhout van der Veen	1 September 1797	22 January 1798	
Henricus Verhagen	1 September 1797	22 January 1798	
Hendrik Verhees	1 September 1797	22 January 1798	
Petrus Verhoysen	1 September 1797	22 January 1798	
Antonius Hieronimus Vesters	1 September 1797	22 January 1798	
Gerardus Anthony Visscher	1 September 1797	22 January 1798	
Coenraad Casparsz. Visser	1 September 1797	22 January 1798	
Herman Hendrik Vitringa	1 September 1797	22 January 1798	
Lambertus Christoffel Vonk	1 September 1797	22 January 1798	
Ary Voogd	20 November 1797	22 January 1798	
Carel de Vos van Steenwijk	1 September 1797	22 January 1798	
Pieter Vreede	1 September 1797	22 January 1798	
Jan Engelbart Sanders van Well	5 September 1797	22 January 1798	
Jan Godefrides Welsman	1 September 1797	22 January 1798	
Jan Steven Wentholt	1 September 1797	22 January 1798	
Berend Wildrik	15 January 1798	22 January 1798	
Michaël Hendrik Witbols	1 September 1797	22 January 1798	
Pier Zeper	2 October 1797	22 January 1798	
Petrus van Zonsbeek	1 September 1797	22 January 1798	
