= Hector Livius van Altena =

Dutch politician (1741–1806)

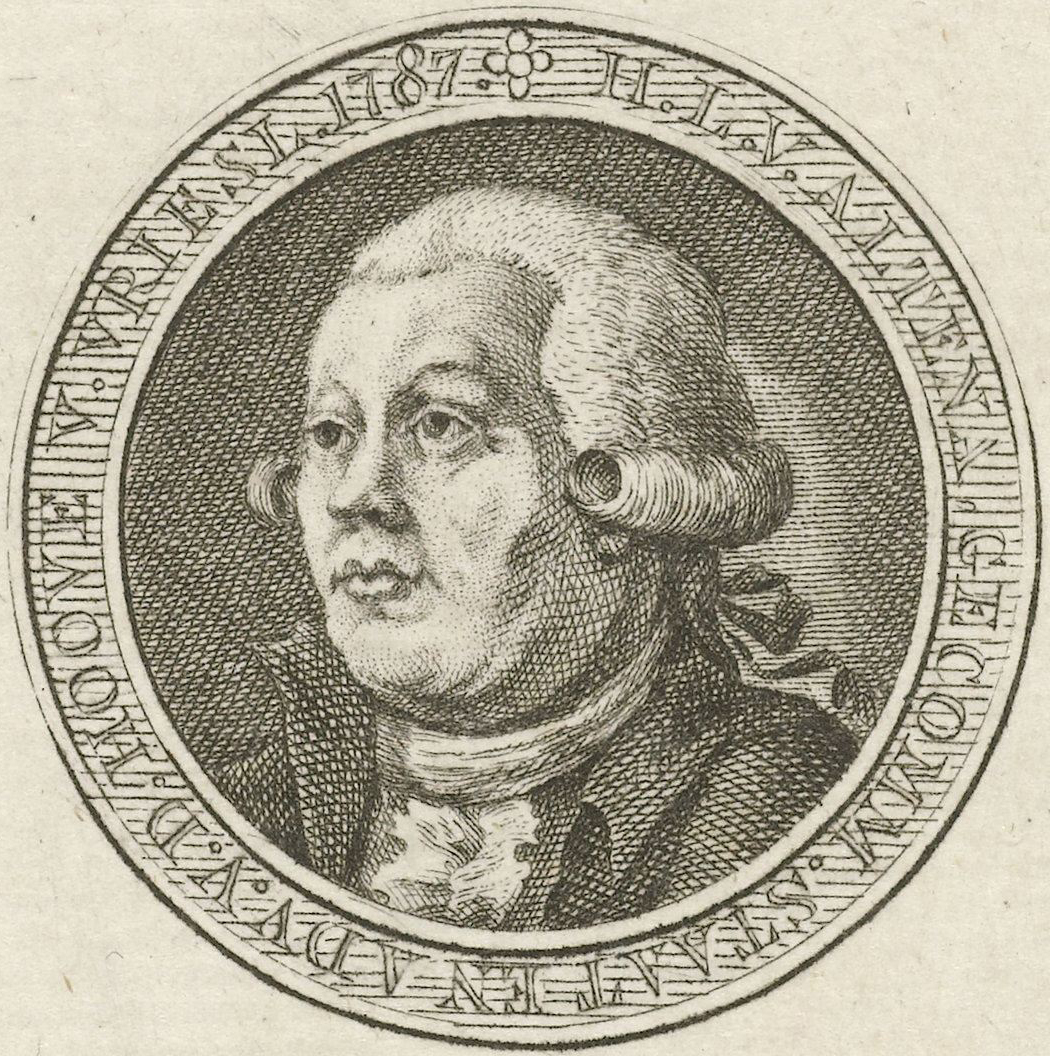

Member of the Representative Body of Friesland
- In office 23 June 1795 – ?
- Constituency: Tietjerksteradeel

Member of the First National Assembly of the Batavian Republic
- In office 1 March 1796 – 31 August 1797
- Constituency: Leeuwarderadeel

Member of the Second National Assembly of the Batavian Republic
- In office 16 October 1797 – 22 January 1798
- Constituency: Leeuwarden

Member of the Constituent Assembly of the Batavian Republic
- In office 22 January 1798 – 4 May 1798

Member of the Representative Body of the Batavian Republic
- In office 4 May 1798 – 12 June 1798

Personal details
- Born: 1741
- Died: 11 April 1806 (aged 64–65) Leeuwarden

Hector Livius van Altena (1741 – 11 April 1806) was a Dutch lawyer and politician who played a significant role in Frisian politics during the late 18th century. He was an opponent of the Orangist majority and later became a member of the National Assembly of the Batavian Republic and its successors.

== Early life ==
Van Altena was the son of Henricus Wiardus van Altena and Johanna Hildegond van Glinstra. His birth date is unknown, but he was baptised on 19 May 1741 in Blessum. On 21 September 1758, he enrolled at the University of Groningen, where he studied law which he did not finish. In 1762, he studied law at the University of Utrecht, which he finished.

== Franeker politics ==
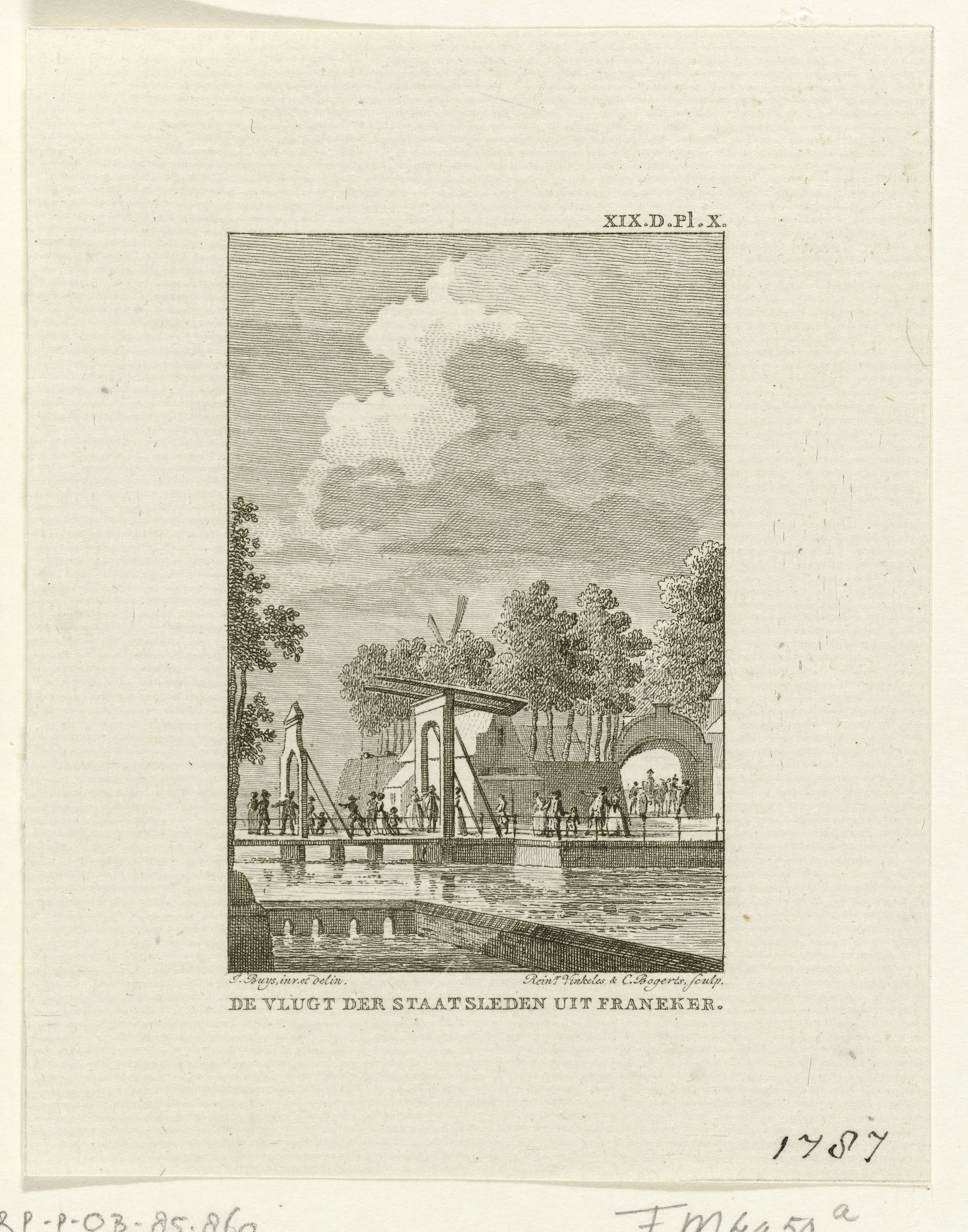
Patriots leaving Franeker after its capture in 1787.

Following his studies, Van Altena established himself as a lawyer in Tietjerk. In 1782, he became a member of the States of Friesland. He was an ally of Court Lambertus van Beyma and was a leading figure in the opposition against the Orangist majority. In 1787 he is clerk of the praetense staten, a Patriotic counter-government meeting in Franeker. It culminated in the capture of Franeker by the Orangists on 3 September 1787.

After the fall of Franeker, Van Altena, like other members of the Franeker assembly, was excluded from the general amnesty declared on 16 October 1787. He fled first to the Austrian Netherlands and later to Saint-Omer in France. Despite his considerable wealth, he arrived there destitute and was granted financial assistance by the French government amounting to 24 livres per week. On 11 September 1801, Van Altena was granted financial compensation of 39,947.17 guilders for the losses he had suffered due to his exile in 1787 and the subsequent years.

== Batavian Republic ==
Following the Batavian Revolution of 1795, Van Altena was appointed as a member of the Representative Body of Friesland. Although the assembly first convened on 19 February, he did not return from Saint-Omer until 21 March, when he took his seat. In mid-1795, he was appointed Postmaster of Friesland, a position he held until his death, except for the periods when he served in legislative assemblies.

On 23 June 1795, in elections for Friesland's permanent administration, Van Altena was chosen as a representative for Dantumadeel. He was subsequently elected to the First National Assembly of the Batavian Republic in the election on 30 March 1796, representing the district of Leeuwarden (excluding the city). He aligned himself with the radicals and continued to follow Van Beyma until the latter adopted a more federalist stance, particularly in financial matters. Van Altena then shifted his allegiance to Pieter Vreede. Van Altena was seldom present in the Assembly and spoke infrequently.

Van Altena was not re-elected on 2 August 1797 for the Second National Assembly but was later chosen as a representative for Leeuwarden. However, due to irregularities, this election was declared invalid. He was subsequently re-elected in the same district on 11 October 1797.

During the coup d'état of 22 January 1798, Van Altena sided with the instigators. He served as chairman of the Constituent Assembly from 19 February to 5 March and again from 30 April to 4 May 1798. On 4 May, a proposal for new elections was introduced, ensuring that all sitting members would retain their seats, following the precedent set in France in October 1795. The assembly was then divided into two chambers, and Van Altena was elected to the lower chamber. His presidency, originally intended for a 14-day term, ended with this restructuring.

His tenure as a representative concluded following another coup d'état of 12 June 1798.

== Personal life ==
On 23 May 1768, Van Altena married Albertina Pierson (1745–1803) in Tietjerk. They had eight children. Van Altena was a Christian.
