= Onderwierum =

- Hamlet
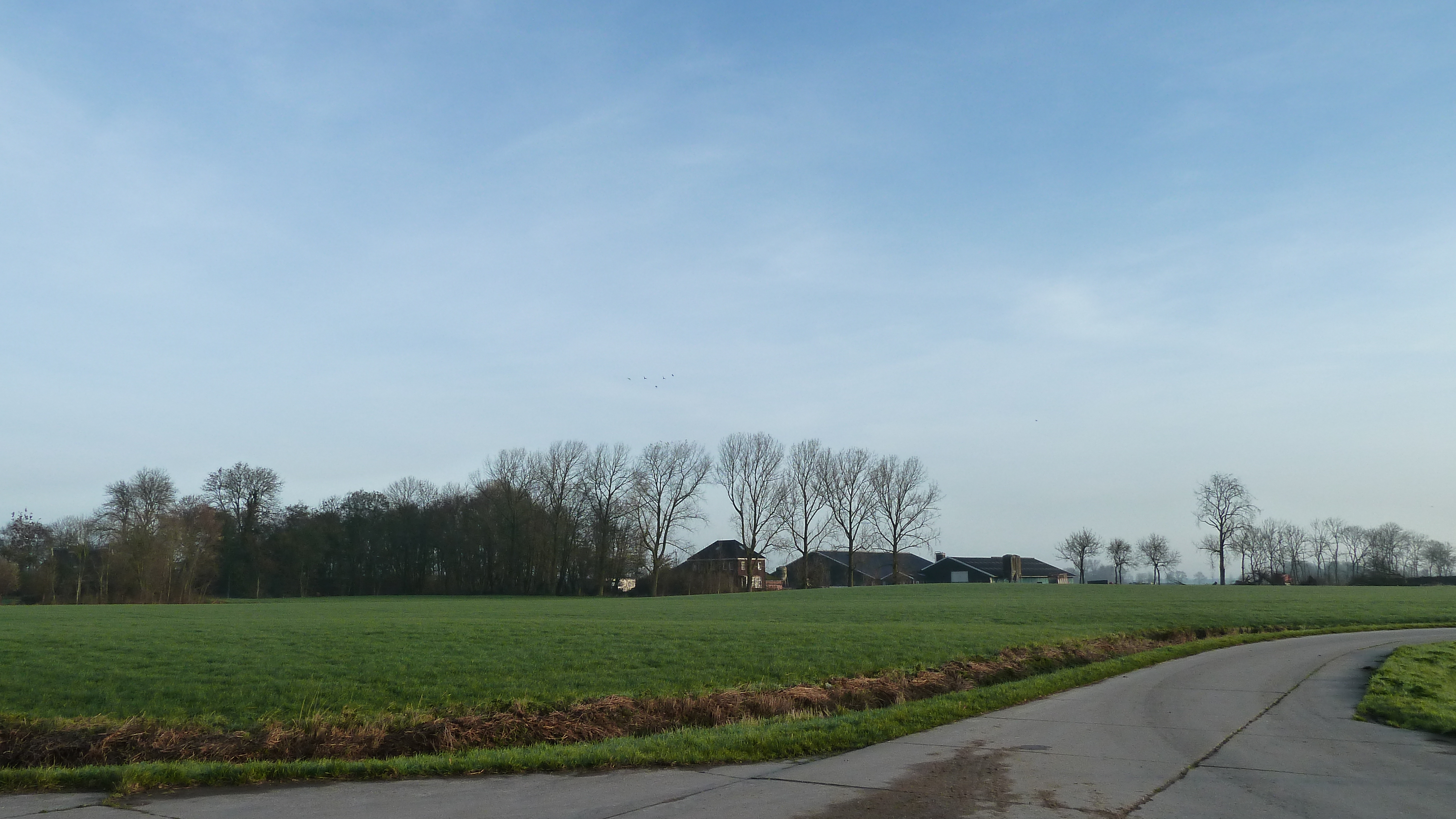
- View of Onderwierum

- Location in the province of Groningen in the Netherlands Onderwierum (Netherlands)
- Coordinates: 53.32733°N 6.58069°E
- Country: Netherlands
- Province: Groningen
- Municipality: Het Hogeland
- Village: Onderdendam
- Elevation: 1.5 m (4.9 ft)
- Time zone: UTC+1 (CET)
  - Summer (DST): UTC+2 (CEST)
- Postcode: 9959
- Area code: 050

Onderwierum is a hamlet in the municipality of Het Hogeland, in the province of Groningen. It is located just south of Onderdendam, of which it is a part administratively. The hamlet is built on two mounds and includes a former cemetery. The hamlet had its own church dating from the Middle Ages which was demolished in 1841.

== Etymology ==
The old name of Onderwierum is Uldernawerum (charters in 1378 and 1386). The name has been reconstructed as Unlanderena wêr-hêm and is thus explained as a raised height (wierde) of people who lived in onland ("swamp"). The name of Onderdendam is also explained in this way.

== Gallery ==
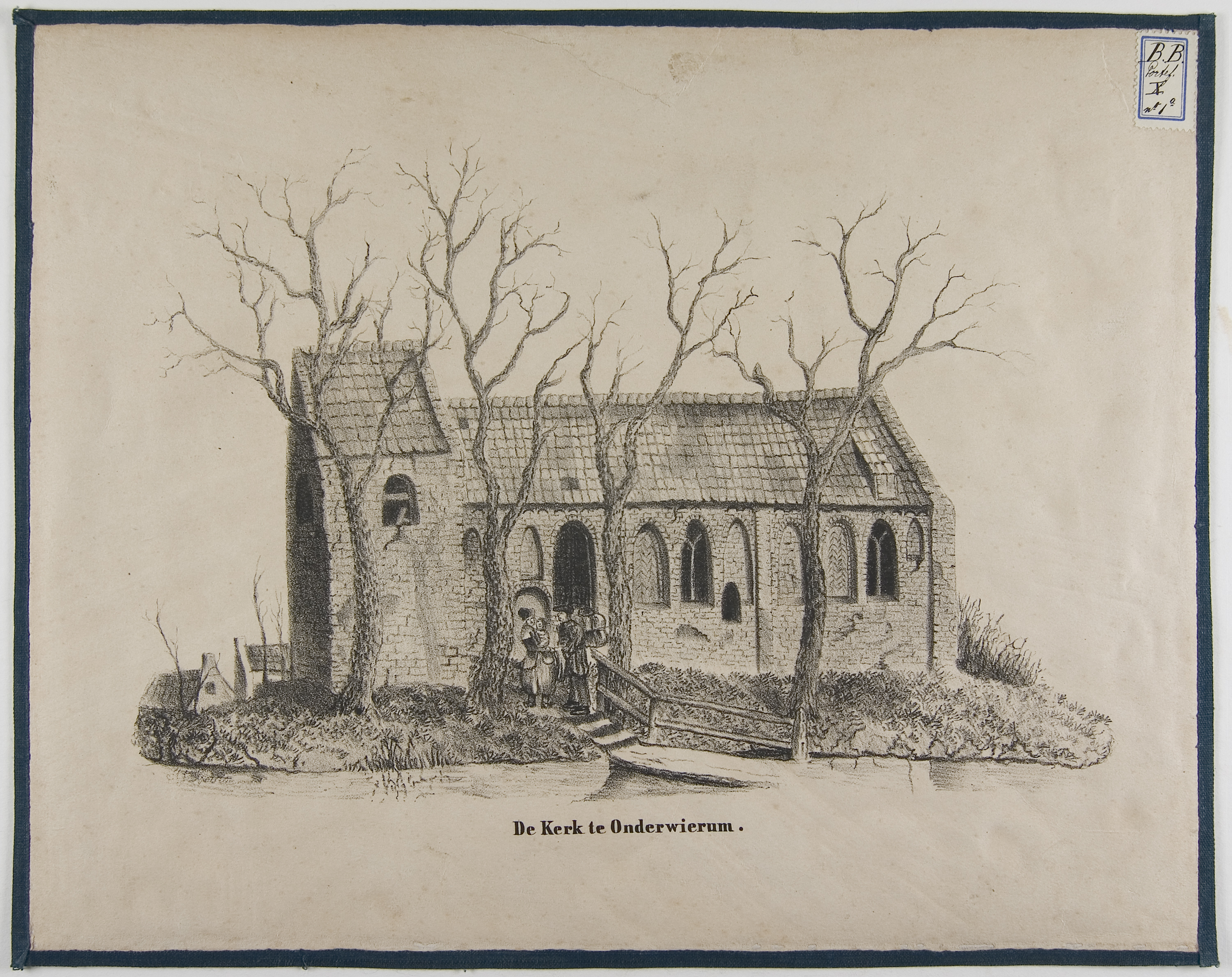
Former church

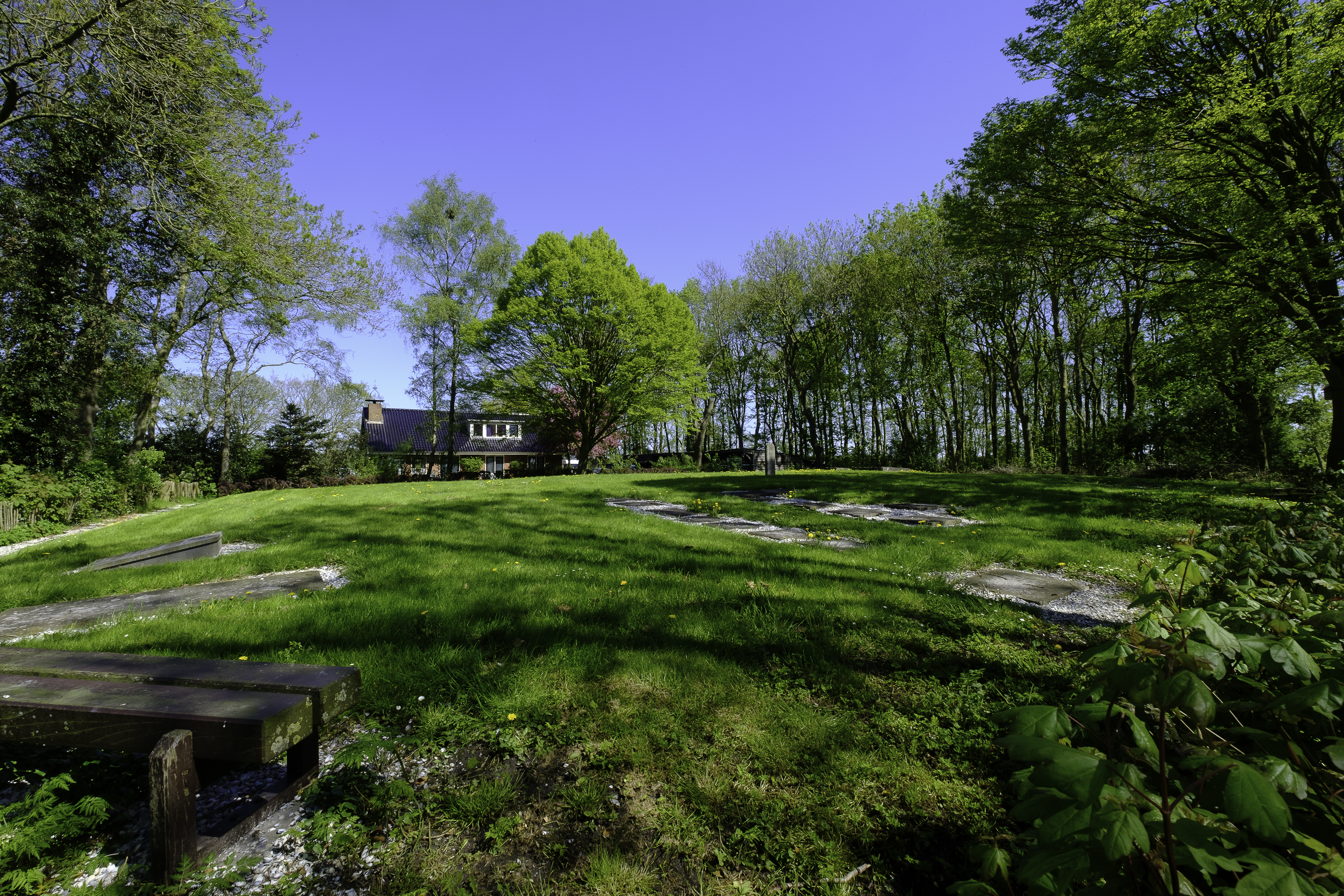
Cemetery

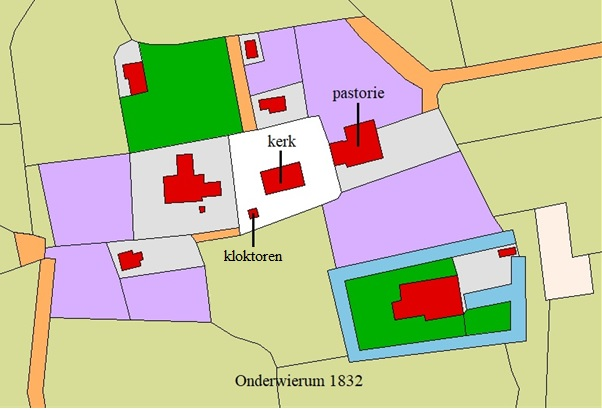
Ground plan of 1832
