= Jacobus Egmondt Austen =

Dutch politician (1754–1804)

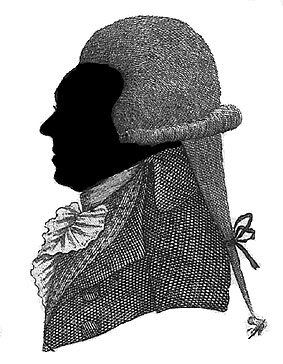

Member of the First National Assembly of the Batavian Republic
- In office 22 April 1796 – 31 August 1797
- Constituency: Middelburg B

Personal details
- Born: 8 December 1754 Middelburg
- Died: 1 May 1804 (aged 49) Middelburg

Jacobus Egmondt Austen (8 December 1754 – 1 May 1804) was a Dutch lawyer and politician. He was a member of the First National Assembly of the Batavian Republic and part of its constitution committee.

== Early life ==
Austen was born on 8 December 1754 in Middelburg. He was the son of Jacobus Austen and Cornelia Smitman. He studied Utrecht University, where he earned a doctorate in law on 22 November 1776. His dissertation was titled Ad statutorum Medioburgensium rubricam XIV de jure succedendi ab intestato, which he translated in Dutch in 1777.

In 1776, he started as a lawyer in Middelburg. Starting in 1780, he was Commissioner of minor affairs. In 1795 and 1796, he was curator of the Latin school in Middelburg. He has also translated several scientific works from Latin to Dutch.

== Political career ==
In 1795, after the Batavian Revolution, he became a member of the Municipal Council of Middelburg. In May and June 1795, he was member of the Assembly of Provisional Representatives of Zeeland. After the 1796 election, he joined the First National Assembly of the Batavian Republic for the district Middelburg B. He was a member of the constitution committee between 22 April 1796 and 10 November 1797. In the Assembly, he remained independent, aligning with neither the Republicans nor the moderates.

== Later life ==
On 2 March 1804, Austen was placed under legal guardianship by the court of the department. He died in 1804 in Middelburg.

== Personal life ==
He was part of the Walloon church. He was unmarried.
