= Augustijn Gerhard Besier =

Dutch politician (1756–1829)

Member of the Provisional Representatives of the People of Overijssel
- In office 1795 – 1795
- Constituency: Zwolle

Member of the First National Assembly of the Batavian Republic
- In office 31 May 1796 – 10 November 1796
- Constituency: Zwolle

Member of the Uitvoerend Bewind
- In office 5 June 1799 – 17 October 1801

Member of the Staatsbewind
- In office 21 October 1801 – 29 April 1805

Member of the Provincial Council of Overijssel
- In office 3 July 1821 – 19 March 1829
- Constituency: Deventer, urban class

Personal details
- Born: 19 May 1756 Deventer
- Died: 13 March 1829 (aged 72) Deventer

Augustijn Gerhard Besier (Note: Sometimes also known as Augustinus) (19 May 1756 – 13 March 1829) was a Dutch politician. He was a member of the First National Assembly of the Batavian Republic and part of the patriot faction.

== Early life ==
Besier received his early education in IJsselstein. In 1772, he studied in Deventer under Johannes Ruardi, Nicolaas Heineken and Georgius Jordens. He continued his studies at the University of Leiden, where he enrolled on 18 September 1775. On 5 February 1780, Besier earned his degree in law, defending a dissertation on the rightful cession of Overijssel to Philip II of Spain.

== Career ==
After completing his studies, Besier began a legal practice in Deventer. He became a magistrate of Deventer and served as the commander of the city's citizen militia, playing a key role in quelling a local uprising. After the Patriottentijd in 1787, Besier was ousted from government and forced to leave. He relocated to Zwolle where he continued his legal practice. After the Batavian Revolution in 1795, Besier became member of the Provisional Representatives of the People of Overijssel for a few months. In 1796, he replaced Willem Queysen as a member of the First National Assembly of the Batavian Republic, after Queysen became member of the constitution committee of the Assembly.

Besier had been appointed member of the Committee of the Navy in The Hague shortly before his appointment to the Assembly. He had not been given a waiver by the Assembly to refuse the appointment. After he left the Assembly in November 1798, he was again appointed member of the Committee of the Navy. Between February 1798 and 1799 he was Commissioner-Director of the Navy in Amsterdam. Later that year he was elected to the Representative Body, but refused and was given an exemption.

In 1799 he was appointed member of the Uitvoerend Bewind. He supported the coup d'état of 1801 and joined the Staatsbewind which replaced the Uitvoerend Bewind. In 1804, French Emperor Napoleon Bonaparte demanded Besier and three others be removed from the Staatsbewind. His appointment was officially over after the Staatsbewind was disbanded in 1805 and replaced by Grand Pensionary Rutger Jan Schimmelpenninck.

After his resignation, Besier moved Amsterdam. He became a member of the general board of the inrichtingen van weldadigheid in 1805. He moved back to Deventer in 1810 and refused an appointment as under-prefect of Winschoten in 1811. 1811, he was appointed a member of the general council of the French department Bouches-de-l'Yssel. After the Netherlands regained independence in 1814, Besier became member of the council of Deventer. In 1821 he also became member of the Provincial Council of Overijssel.

== Personal life ==
With his first wife, Esther Wilhelmina Clignet (1760–1805), he had seven sons and one daughter. In 1809, Besier remarried Jeanne Frederique de Mey (1782–1810). He was a Reformed Christian.
