= Nationalversammlung =

Nationalversammlung (German: National Assembly) may refer to

- Frankfurt Parliament, Deutsche Nationalversammlung von 1848–1849 in Frankfurt am Main
  - Prussian National Assembly, Preußische Nationalversammlung von 1848
- Provisional National Assembly, Provisorische Nationalversammlung, 1918-1919 for the Republic of German-Austria
- Constituent National Assembly (Austria), Konstituierende Nationalversammlung, 1919-1920
- Weimar National Assembly, Deutsche Nationalversammlung von 1919 in Weimar, the parliament of the Weimar Republic
  - Badische Nationalversammlung von 1919, the assembly for Baden
