= Representative Body of the Batavian Republic (May-June 1798) =

Legislative term

←	Constituent Assembly

Overview
- Term: 4 May 1798 – 12 June 1798

Eerste Kamer

Tweede Kamer

The Representative Body (May-June 1798) (Dutch: Vertegenwoordigend Lichaam) was the legislative term between 4 May 1798 and 12 June 1798 Representative Body of the Batavian Republic. It was a continuation of the Constituent Assembly of the Batavian Republic after the adoption of the new constitution, the Staatsregeling 1798. The term ended after the coup d'état of 12 June 1798 and was replaced by the Intermediary Legislative Body, which prepared the 1798 election for a new Representative Body.

== Members ==
Name	Begin date	End date	Ref.
Willem Andries Abbema	4 May 1798	12 June 1798	
Hector Livius van Altena	4 May 1798	12 June 1798	
Ale Ales Bakker	18 May 1798	12 June 1798	
Gerard Beljaart	4 May 1798	12 June 1798	
Wilhelmus Theodorus van Bennekom	4 May 1798	12 June 1798	
Arent Julianus Carel de Bère	4 May 1798	12 June 1798	
Arnoldus Anthonius van Berenbroeck	4 May 1798	12 June 1798	
Eduard Marius van Beyma	4 May 1798	12 June 1798	
Harm Jan van Bolhuis	4 May 1798	12 June 1798	
Derk Sebes Bonthuis	4 May 1798	12 June 1798	
Bernardus Bosch	4 May 1798	12 June 1798	
Johannes Josephus Brands	4 May 1798	12 June 1798	
Hermanus Leonardus Bromet	4 May 1798	12 June 1798	
Bernardus Bruins	4 May 1798	12 June 1798	
Hermanus ten Cate	4 May 1798	12 June 1798	
Hendrik Costerus	4 May 1798	12 June 1798	
Willebrordus Anthonius Dams	4 May 1798	12 June 1798	
Johannes Fronhoff	4 May 1798	12 June 1798	
Oene Gerrits Gorter	4 May 1798	12 June 1798	
Johannes Petrus Goudsblom	4 May 1798	12 June 1798	
Franciscus Xaverius Govers	4 May 1798	12 June 1798	
Petrus Franciscus Guljé	4 May 1798	12 June 1798	
Abraham de Haan	4 May 1798	12 June 1798	
Cornelis van der Hoeven	4 May 1798	12 June 1798	
Laurens Hoogendijk	4 May 1798	12 June 1798	
Herman Hoogewal	12 September 1798	17 October 1801	
Godefridus Franciscus Antonius Henricus Cornelius van Hugenpoth tot Aerdt	1 June 1798	12 June 1798	
Jacobus Janssen	4 May 1798	12 June 1798	
Johannes Henricus Kreylkamp	4 May 1798	12 June 1798	
Theodorus van Leeuwen	4 May 1798	12 June 1798	
Johannes Diederik van Leeuwen	4 May 1798	12 June 1798	
Hartog Lemon	4 May 1798	12 June 1798	
Willem Libotté	4 May 1798	12 June 1798	
Jan Hendrik Meyer	4 May 1798	12 June 1798	
Johannes Henricus Midderigh	4 May 1798	12 June 1798	
Joan Hendrik Nieuwenhuis	4 May 1798	12 June 1798	
Lambertus Nolst	4 May 1798	12 June 1798	
Willem Anthony Ockerse	4 May 1798	12 June 1798	
Johan Richard van Ommeren	4 May 1798	12 June 1798	
Jurianus Arnoldus Ondorp	4 May 1798	12 June 1798	
Jan Franciscus Pannebakker	4 May 1798	12 June 1798	
Petrus Mattheus Pertat	4 May 1798	12 June 1798	
Johannes Petrus Pessers	4 May 1798	12 June 1798	
Adrianus Ploos van Amstel	4 May 1798	12 June 1798	
Jan Proot	4 May 1798	12 June 1798	
Henry Louis Quesnel	4 May 1798	12 June 1798	
Henri Rabinel	4 May 1798	12 June 1798	
Frederik Rant	4 May 1798	12 June 1798	
François Adriaan van Rosevelt Cateau	4 May 1798	12 June 1798	
Simon Schermer	4 May 1798	12 June 1798	
Petrus de Sonnaville	4 May 1798	12 June 1798	
Pieter Toens	4 May 1798	12 June 1798	
Joachim Nuhout van der Veen	4 May 1798	12 June 1798	
Henricus Verhagen	4 May 1798	12 June 1798	
Hendrik Verhees	4 May 1798	12 June 1798	
Tammerus Canter Visscher	4 May 1798	12 June 1798	
Coenraad Casparsz. Visser	4 May 1798	12 June 1798	
Lambertus Christoffel Vonk	4 May 1798	12 June 1798	
Ary Voogd	4 May 1798	12 June 1798	
Jan Engelbart Sanders van Well	4 May 1798	12 June 1798	
Jan Godefrides Welsman	4 May 1798	12 June 1798	
Michaël Hendrik Witbols	4 May 1798	12 June 1798	
Petrus van Zonsbeek	4 May 1798	12 June 1798	
