= Staatsbewind =

Executive Authority of the Batavian Republic (1801–1805)

The Staatsbewind (translated into English as "state council" or "state authority") was a governing council of the Batavian Republic between 1801 and 1805. The presidents of the Staatsbewind were acting heads of state of the Batavian Republic.

== Reign of the Staatsbewind ==
The Staatsbewind came into power after a coup d'état against the Uitvoerend Bewind on 17 October 1801. The reign of the Staatsbewind ended on 29 April 1805, when emperor Napoleon of France appointed Rutger Jan Schimmelpenninck as grand pensionary of the Batavian Republic.

== Members ==
Name	Membership term		President term		Ref.
Name	Begin date	End date	Begin date	End date	Ref.
Augustijn Gerhard Besier	21 October 1801	29 April 1805	1 November 1803	31 January 1804	
Willem Aernout de Beveren	21 October 1801	29 April 1805	1 November 1804	31 January 1805	
Jan Bernd Bicker	10 October 1802	29 April 1805	1 February 1805	29 April 1805	
Cornelis Gerrit Bijleveld	21 October 1803	29 April 1805			
Gerard Brantsen	17 October 1801	29 April 1805	1 May 1804	31 July 1804	
Campegius Hermannus Gockinga	4 January 1802	29 April 1805	1 May 1803	31 July 1803	
Anthonie Frederik Robbert Evert van Haersolte	17 October 1801	29 April 1805	1 February 1804	30 April 1804	
Samuel van Hoogstraten	17 October 1801	29 April 1805	1 May 1802	31 July 1802	
mr. Daniël Cornelis de Leeuw	17 October 1801	29 April 1805	1 August 1803	31 October 1803	
Otto Lewe van Aduard	17 October 1801	?	1 August 1803	31 October 1803	
Gerrit Jan Pijman	17 October 1801	1 November 1802	11 August 1802	31 October 1802	
Willem Queysen	17 October 1801	29 April 1805	1 August 1804	31 October 1804	
Egbert Sjuck Gerrold baron Juckema van Burmania Rengers	17 October 1801	29 April 1805	1 February 1802	30 April 1802	
Jacob Spoors	21 October 1801	29 April 1805	1 February 1803	30 April 1803	
Johannes Baptista Verheyen	17 October 1801	31 October 1803	1 November 1802	31 January 1803	
