= Jan van Hooff (politician) =

Dutch politician, mayor and justice minister (1755–1816)

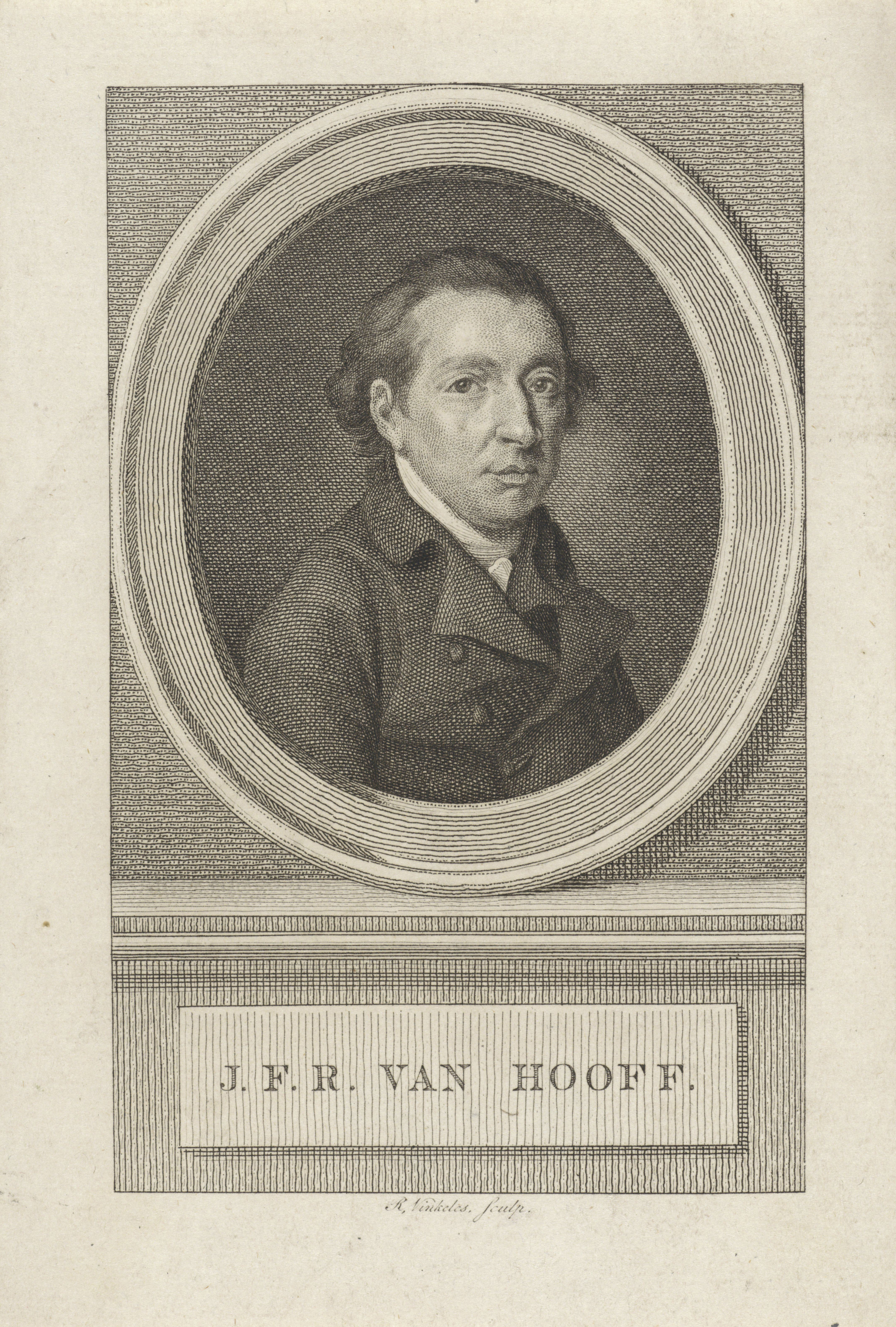
Johan Frederik Rudolph van Hooff, by Reinier Vinkeles.

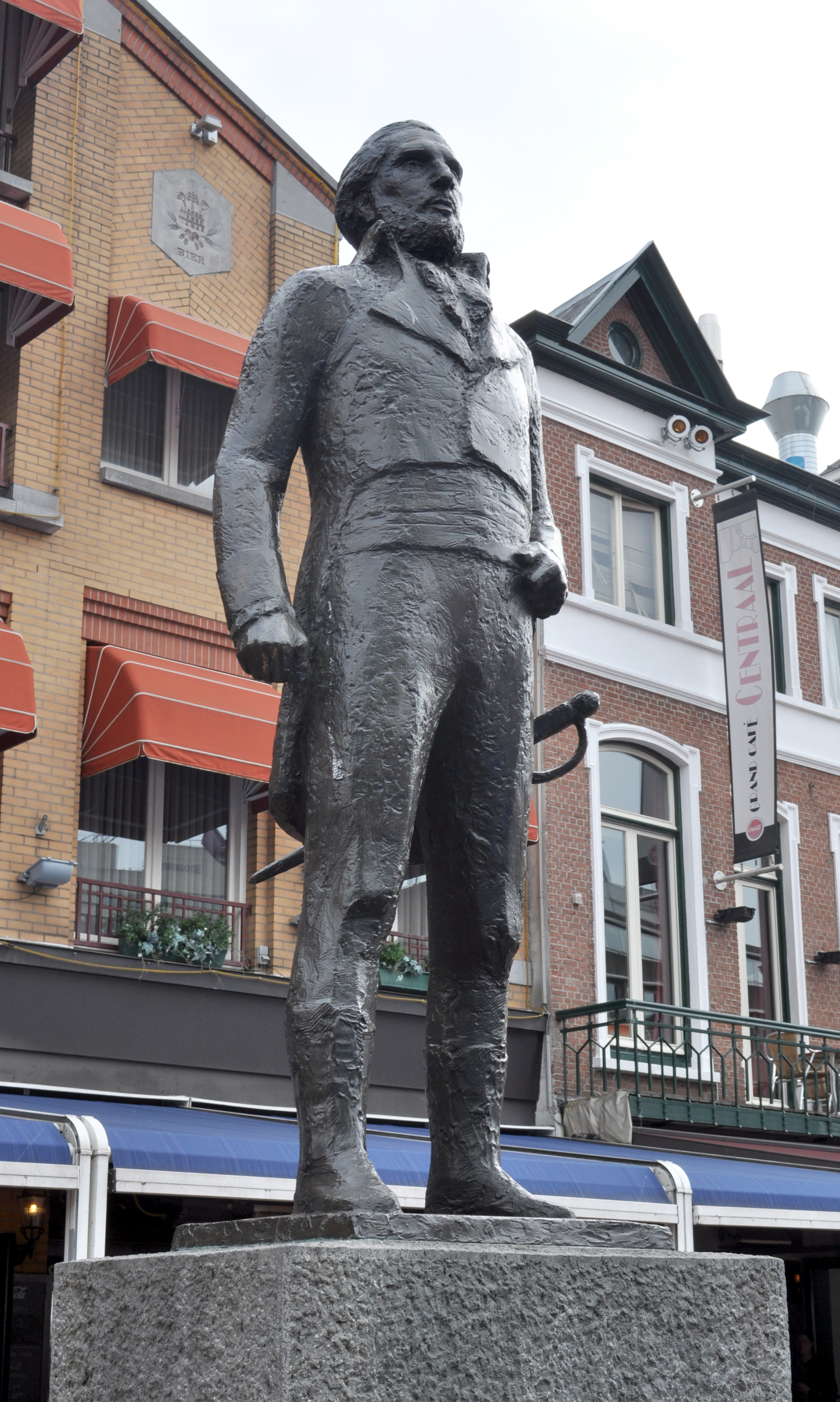
Jan van Hooff (1981) by Auke Hettema on the Markt in Eindhoven.

Johan Frederik Rudolph "Jan" van Hooff (26 August 1755 – 13 June 1816, in Utrecht) was a Dutch Patriot politician and statesman.

== Biography ==
Van Hooff was born in Eindhoven in 1755, to Martinus van Hooff (co-mayor of the town) and Anna Elisabeth Bols van Arendonck. He studied law, got his doctorate in law at Nancy and opened a law practice in Eindhoven. He was elected co-mayor of the town in 1786. During his career he was mayor of Eindhoven, member of the First National Assembly, the Second National Assembly, the Executive Power and the Legislative Power.

In 1786 he founded the Vaderlandse Sociëteit Concordia (English: National Society Concordia) together with Amandus van Moorsel; this society was a social club in name, but a Patriot organization in reality. Several town notables joined this society.

In 1787 Jan van Hoff and several other Eindhoven Patriots traveled to Utrecht to join the Patriot Army. This army was defeated by the Prussian Army, after which Van Hooff was arrested (in October 1787) for his Patriotic activities, on the orders of the States-General of the Netherlands; he was taken to The Hague and imprisoned. He was released shortly thereafter and returned to Eindhoven. However, he was re-arrested on 12 February 1788 (in Eindhoven this time), but managed to escape.

In 1789 there was a failed, pro-French rebellion in the Southern Netherlands. Fearing that the insurrection would spread to the Generality Lands, the States-General posted a garrison in Eindhoven; Van Hooff left the town. In 1792 he was in Paris together with Herman Willem Daendels, where the French Republic had been proclaimed. He sought (and received) French support for the reparation of Batavian freedom (Dutch: herstelling van de Bataafse vrijheid); French troops arrived in Eindhoven on 6 March 1793 and the freedom tree was planted in the town on that day. The French were subsequently pushed back by the Austrians, but took permanent possession of the town following the 1794 Battle of Fleurus.

Van Hooff became a member of the Batavian Revolutionary Committee that year, but got into a conflict with Maximilien Robespierre. He was arrested on 28 May and imprisoned at the Paris Conciergerie. A clerical error in the spelling of his name saved Van Hooff from the guillotine and he was released again on 29 October. He remained in freedom until the coup of 22 January 1798, after which he was arrested and imprisoned — first at the Gevangenpoort in The Hague, later at the Palace Huis Ten Bosch. He was finally released on 14 July.

He served as Minister for Justice and was a member of the State Council until 1810. He then retired and spent the rest of his life as a citizen without office. He died without having been married.

== Monuments and statues ==
The city of Eindhoven commissioned Auke Hettema to make a statue of Van Hooff in 1981. The statue is currently on the Markt in Eindhoven.
