= Tammo Adriaan ten Berge =

Dutch politician (1756–1830)

Tammo Adriaan ter Berge
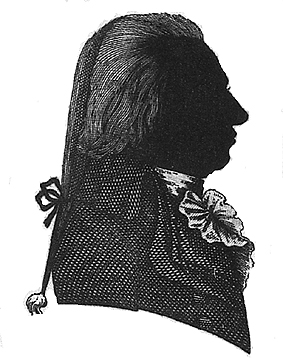

Member of the First National Assembly of the Batavian Republic
- In office 1 March 1796 – 31 August 1797
- Constituency: Groningen II

Member of the Second National Assembly of the Batavian Republic
- In office 1 September 1797 – 22 January 1798
- Constituency: Groningen I

Personal details
- Born: 25 February 1756 Bergen op Zoom
- Died: 22 October 1830 (aged 74) Groningen
- Education: University of Groningen

Tammo Adriaan ten Berge (25 February 1756 – 22 October 1830) was a Dutch lawyer, judge and politician. He was a member of the National Assembly of the Batavian Republic.

== Early life ==
Ten Berge was enrolled as a student at the University of Groningen on 22 July 1768. He obtained his doctorate in law on 27 June 1775, with a dissertation titled De conditionibus tacitis. After completing his studies, he became a lawyer in Groningen.

== Career ==
In 1778, shortly after obtaining his doctorate, Ten Berge was appointed as a judge in Lellens. By 1777, he was also a member of the government of Groningen. Following the political changes of 1795 as part of the Batavian Revolution, Ten Berge became a member of the municipal council of Groningen on 27 February 1795. On 13 March 1795, he was appointed to a four-member committee for financial matters. In the same year, he became the curator (administrator) of the University of Groningen, a position he held until 2 June 1798.

Ten Berge was elected as a representative to the National Assembly of the Batavian Republic on 27 January 1796, representing the Groningen's second electoral district. He was appointed to various committees and was known for his moderate federalist views. From 3 to 17 October 1796, he served as president of the National Assembly. He was re-elected to the Second National Assembly in 1797, representing Groningen's first electoral district.

During the coup d'état of 22 January 1798, Ten Berge was not arrested, but he was removed from office after he refused to sign a declaration against federalism. Subsequently, he was dismissed as curator of the university. However, after the coup d'état of 12 June 1798, he was reappointed to the municipal council of Groningen on 28 June.

In the 1798 election for the Representative Body, Ten Berge was not initially a candidate in Groningen, but due to his reputation, he was elected as an alternate in Schoonhoven. He was unable to take his seat as he had not registered on the voter rolls. Soon after, he was appointed as the public prosecutor for Stad en Lande. Following the division of the Netherlands into departments in November 1798, he was appointed to the department of the Ems. On 9 March 1802, he was appointed as the public prosecutor at the National Court in The Hague but declined the position. He instead accepted the role of public prosecutor at the court of the department of Groningen. In November 1802, he was also appointed as a member of the National Syndicate, but he refused.

In 1806, Ten Berge became a judge at the court of Groningen. After the incorporation of the Netherlands by France, he was appointed as a judge on 24 January 1811 and vice-president of the court of the first instance of Groningen on 27 February 1812. In December 1821, he was appointed as the president of the court, a position he held until his death. He also resumed his role as curator of the University of Groningen on 16 October 1815, a position he also held until his death.

== Personal life ==
On 10 July 1792, Ten Berge married Anna Maria Geertruida van Swinderen (1770-1844), widow of Hendrik Jan Upmeyer. Together, they had one son and two daughters.

He was part of the Reformed and later the Walloon church.
