= Willem Aernout de Beveren =

Dutch politician (1749–1820)

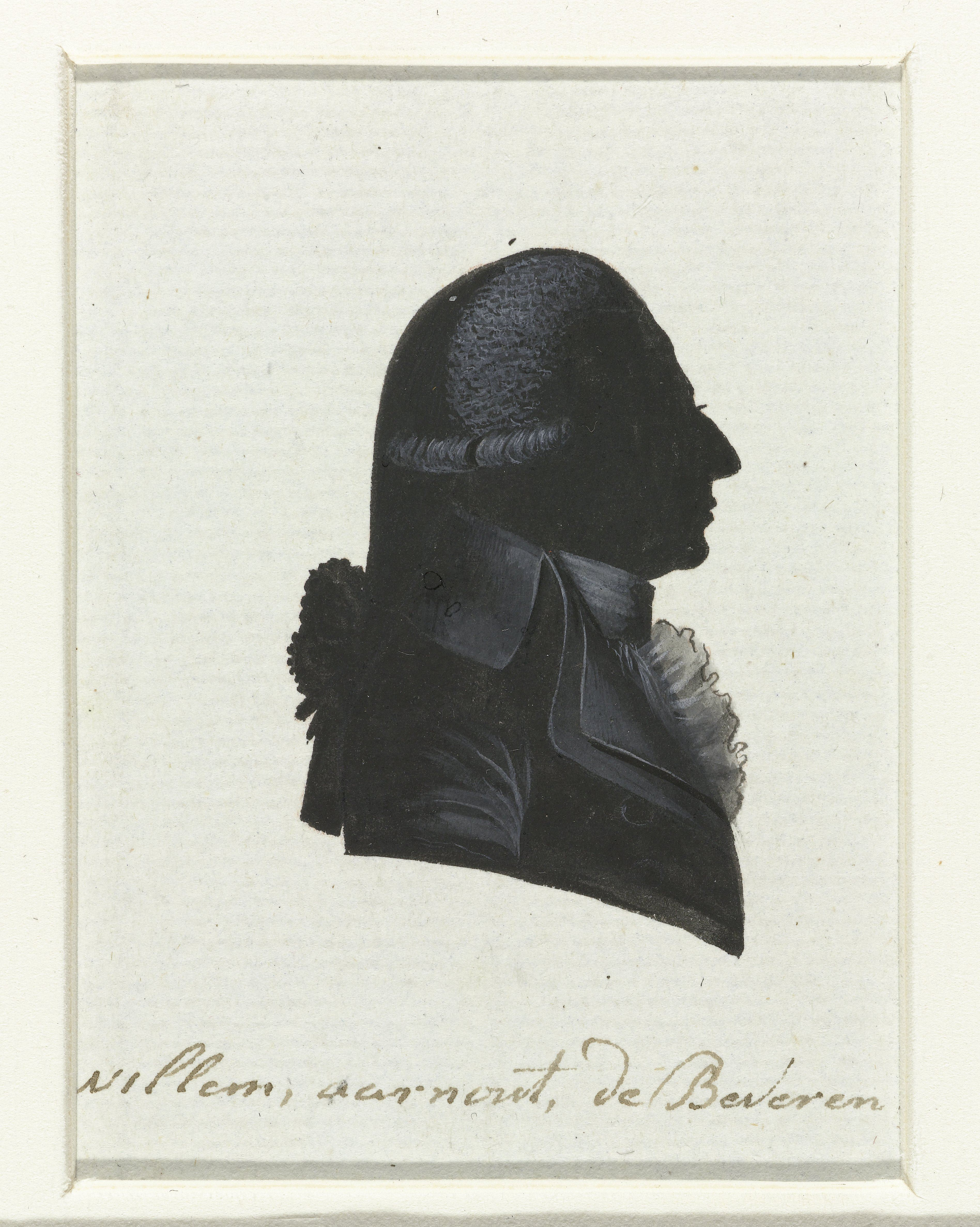

Member of the National Assembly of the Batavian Republic
- In office 14 April 1796 – 22 January 1798
- Constituency: Middelburg-A

Personal details
- Born: 4 December 1749 Middelburg
- Died: 17 June 1820 (aged 70) The Hague

Willem Aernout de Beveren (4 December 1749 – 17 June 1820) was a Dutch politician. He was a member of the National Assembly of the Batavian Republic and the Staatsbewind.

== Early life ==
De Beveren was born in 1749 in Middelburg as the son of minister Antoni Willem de Beveren and Jozina Christina van Citters. De Beveren attended the Latin school in his hometown of Middelburg from 1761 to 1765. In 1768, he studied law at the University of Utrecht.

== Political career ==
On 17 March 1770, De Beveren was appointed as second pensionary of Middelburg. Around the same time, he became commissioner in the desolate estate office. In March 1774, he became member of the States of Zeeland. Between 1782 and 1785, he was promoted to first pensionary of Middelburg. In this role, he was delegated to the States General, including in 1783, when he was tasked with investigating the failed expedition to Brest. On 30 January 1786, he was appointed secretary of the States of Zeeland. That same year, he served on a commission to Utrecht alongside pensionary Laurens Pieter van de Spiegel and Willem Aarnout van Citters to resolve disputes and preserve the Union of Utrecht. In 1786 and 1794, he was member of the States General of the Netherlands.

After the Batavian Revolution in 1795, De Beveren became member and secretary of the Provisional Representatives of the People of Zeeland, the successor of the States of Zeeland. In 1796, he was elected to the National Assembly of the Batavian Republic, representing the district Middelburg-A. He resigned from his positions in Zeeland. Within the Assembly, he was elected to the committee for foreign affairs.

During the coup d'état of 22 January 1798, he was placed under house arrest and later imprisoned in Huis Honselaarsdijk together with the other members of the committee for foreign affairs. The committee was the primary scapegoat for legitimising the coup after the defeat at the Battle of Camperdown. He was released following the coup d'état of 12 June 1798. Afterwards, he became councilor of the Court of the Department of Scheldt and Maas. Between 1801 and 1805, he was member of the Staatsbewind.

In 1805, he became member of the Council of Judicature for Means by Water or Land (Dutch: Raad van Judicature over de Middelen te Water en te Lande), until it was disestablished by the French in 1811. When the council was re-established as the High Court of Finance and Maritime Affairs (Dutch: Hoog Gerechtshof voor Financiën en Zeezaken) in 1814 after the Sovereign Principality of the United Netherlands was founded, he became a member and remained until 1820.

== Personal life ==
On 20 December 1774, he married Sara Maria Pous (1750–1834), with whom he had four children. He was a Reformed Christian.
