= Constituent Assembly of the Batavian Republic =

Constituent Assembly Constituerende Vergadering

History
- Founded: 22 January 1798
- Disbanded: 4 May 1798
- Preceded by: National Assembly of the Batavian Republic

The Constituent Assembly (Dutch: Constituerende Vergadering) was the legislature of the Batavian Republic after the January 1798 coup d'état. The members came from the Second National Assembly, which was elected during the 1797 Batavian Republic general election. However, some had been expelled during the coup, while others had resigned voluntarily. Its main objective was to write a new constitution, which became the Staatsregeling 1798 which was approved in the 1798 referendum. On 4 May, the Constituent Assembly transitioned into the Representative Body.

== Members ==
Name	Begin date	End date	Ref.
Willem Andries Abbema	22 January 1798	4 May 1798	
Hector Livius van Altena	22 January 1798	4 May 1798	
Joan Bernard Auffmorth	22 January 1798	4 May 1798	
Ale Ales Bakker	22 January 1798	4 May 1798	
Gerard Beljaart	22 January 1798	4 May 1798	
Wilhelmus Theodorus van Bennekom	22 January 1798	4 May 1798	
Arent Julianus Carel de Bère	22 January 1798	4 May 1798	
Arnoldus Anthonius van Berenbroeck	22 January 1798	4 May 1798	
Eduard Marius van Beyma	22 January 1798	4 May 1798	
Jacobus Blaauw	22 January 1798	14 February 1798	
Harm Jan van Bolhuis	8 February 1798	4 May 1798	
Derk Sebes Bonthuis	22 January 1798	4 May 1798	
Bernardus Bosch	22 January 1798	4 May 1798	
Johannes Josephus Brands	22 January 1798	4 May 1798	
Hermanus Leonardus Bromet	22 January 1798	4 May 1798	
Bernardus Bruins	22 January 1798	4 May 1798	
Hermanus ten Cate	22 January 1798	4 May 1798	
Hendrik Costerus	25 January 1798	4 May 1798	
Willebrordus Anthonius Dams	22 January 1798	4 May 1798	
Franciscus Derks	22 January 1798	4 May 1798	
Jacob Hendrik Floh	22 January 1798	4 May 1798	
Johan Pieter Fokker	22 January 1798	24 January 1798	
Johannes Fronhoff	22 January 1798	4 May 1798	
Oene Gerrits Gorter Gorter	22 January 1798	4 May 1798	
Johannes Petrus Goudsblom	22 January 1798	4 May 1798	
Franciscus Xaverius Govers	22 January 1798	4 May 1798	
Petrus Franciscus Guljé	22 January 1798	4 May 1798	
Abraham de Haan	22 January 1798	4 May 1798	
Cornelis van der Hoeven	22 January 1798	4 May 1798	
Bernardus Wilhelmus Hoffman	22 January 1798	4 May 1798	
Laurens Hoogendijk	22 January 1798	4 May 1798	
Godefridus Franciscus Antonius Henricus Cornelius van Hugenpoth tot Aerdt	22 January 1798	4 May 1798	
Adriaan van der Jagt	22 January 1798	3 April 1798	
Jacobus Janssen	22 January 1798	4 May 1798	
Jan Konijnenburg	22 January 1798	4 May 1798	
Johannes Henricus Kreylkamp	22 January 1798	4 May 1798	
Stefanus Jacobus van Langen	22 January 1798	25 January 1798	
Theodorus van Leeuwen	22 January 1798	4 May 1798	
Johannes Diederik van Leeuwen	22 January 1798	4 May 1798	
Hartog Lemon	22 January 1798	4 May 1798	
Willem Libotté	22 January 1798	4 May 1798	
Johannes van Lokhorst	22 January 1798	4 May 1798	
Jan Hendrik Meyer	22 January 1798	4 May 1798	
Johannes Henricus Midderigh	22 January 1798	4 May 1798	
Joan Hendrik Nieuwenhuis	22 January 1798	4 May 1798	
Jacobus Jzn Nolet	22 January 1798	12 April 1798	
Lambertus Nolst	22 January 1798	4 May 1798	
Willem Anthony Ockerse	22 January 1798	4 May 1798	
Johan Richard van Ommeren	22 January 1798	4 May 1798	
Jurianus Arnoldus Ondorp	22 January 1798	4 May 1798	
Jan Franciscus Pannebakker	22 January 1798	4 May 1798	
Petrus Mattheus Pertat	22 January 1798	4 May 1798	
Johannes Petrus Pessers	22 January 1798	4 May 1798	
Jan Proot	22 January 1798	4 May 1798	
Henry Louis Quesnel	23 January 1798	4 May 1798	
Henri Rabinel	26 January 1798	4 May 1798	
Frederik Rant	22 January 1798	4 May 1798	
François Adriaan van Rosevelt Cateau	22 January 1798	4 May 1798	
Simon Schermer	22 January 1798	4 May 1798	
Petrus de Sonnaville	22 January 1798	4 May 1798	
Pieter Toens	22 January 1798	4 May 1798	
Joachim Nuhout van der Veen	22 January 1798	4 May 1798	
Henricus Verhagen	22 January 1798	4 May 1798	
Hendrik Verhees	22 January 1798	4 May 1798	
Antonius Hieronimus Vesters	22 January 1798	4 May 1798	
Tammerus Canter Visscher	15 February 1798	4 May 1798	
Coenraad Casparsz Visser	8 February 1798	4 May 1798	
Lambertus Christoffel Vonk	22 January 1798	4 May 1798	
Ary Voogd	22 January 1798	4 May 1798	
Pieter Vreede	22 January 1798	25 January 1798	
Jan Engelbart Sanders van Well	7 February 1798	4 May 1798	
Jan Godefrides Welsman	22 January 1798	4 May 1798	
Michaël Hendrik Witbols	22 January 1798	4 May 1798	
Petrus van Zonsbeek	22 January 1798	4 May 1798	
