= Soestdijk =

- Neighbourhood and hamlet
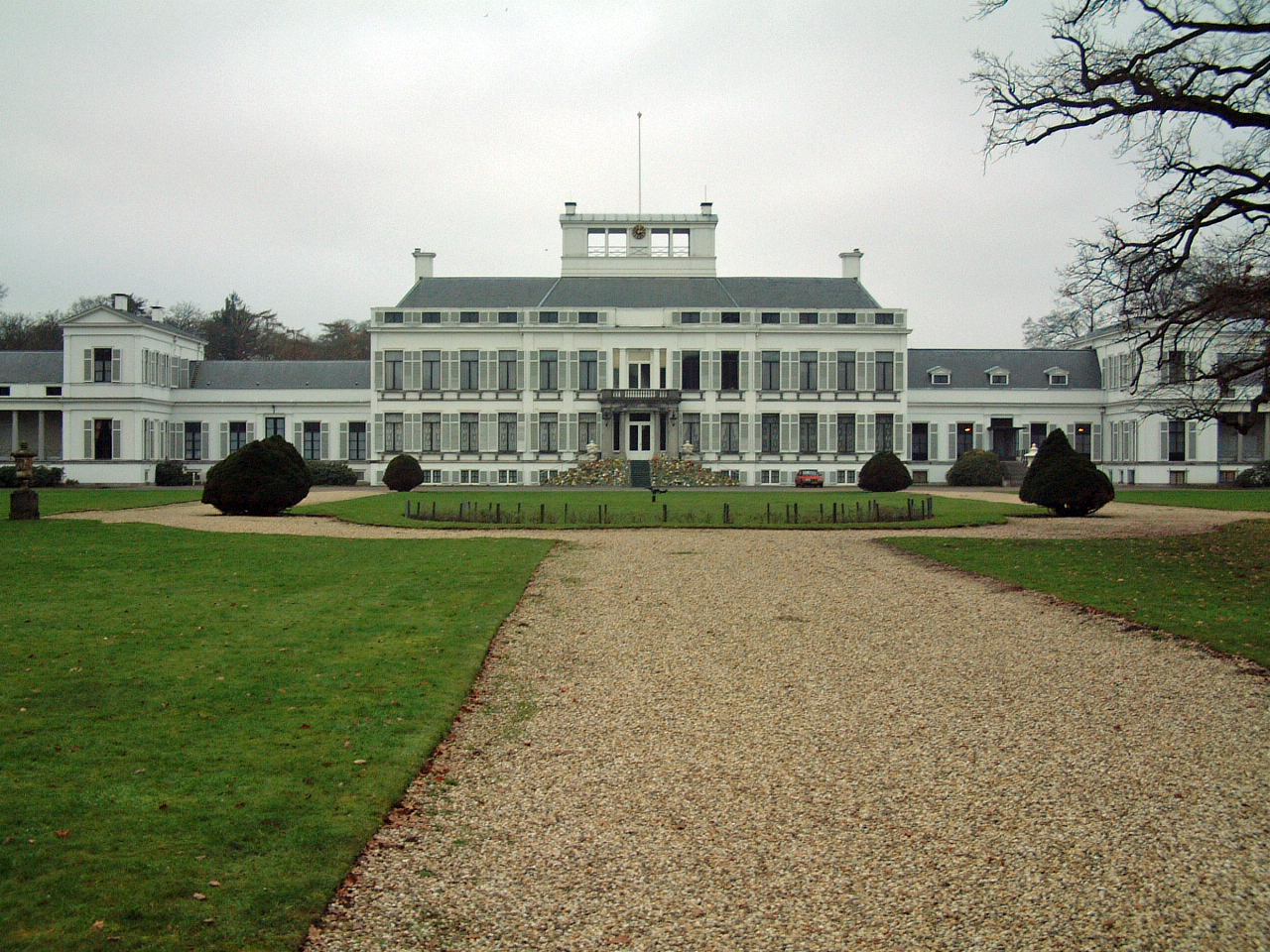
- Palace Soestdijk

- Location in the Netherlands Soestdijk (Netherlands)
- Coordinates: 52°11′27″N 5°16′56″E
- Country: Netherlands
- Province: Utrecht
- Municipality: Soest; Baarn

Area
  - Total: 1.84 km^{2} (0.71 sq mi)
- Elevation: 14 m (46 ft)

Population (2021)
  - Total: 4,830
  - Density: 2,630/km^{2} (6,800/sq mi)
- Time zone: UTC+1 (CET)
  - Summer (DST): UTC+2 (CEST)
- Postal code: 3761
- Dialing code: 035

Soestdijk (Dutch pronunciation: [suzˈdɛik]) is a neighbourhood of Soest and a hamlet in the municipality of Baarn. Both are part of the province of Utrecht, Netherlands. The village gives its name to Paleis Soestdijk, which from 1937 to 2004 was the residence of Princess and later Queen Juliana and Prince Bernhard (who both died in 2004).

Most of Soestdijk is now a neighbourhood of the town of Soest. A smaller part of the former village, including the palace, is part of the municipality of Baarn, and can still be considered a hamlet.

It was first mentioned in 1394 as Zoesdijck and means "dike near Soest" which had been built in 1378 to provide better road access to Utrecht. The palace was built in 1674. In 1840, Soestdijk was home to 108 people. Soestdijk railway station opened in 1898 and is located in Soest. The hamlet in Baarn nowadays consists of about 30 houses.

== Gallery ==
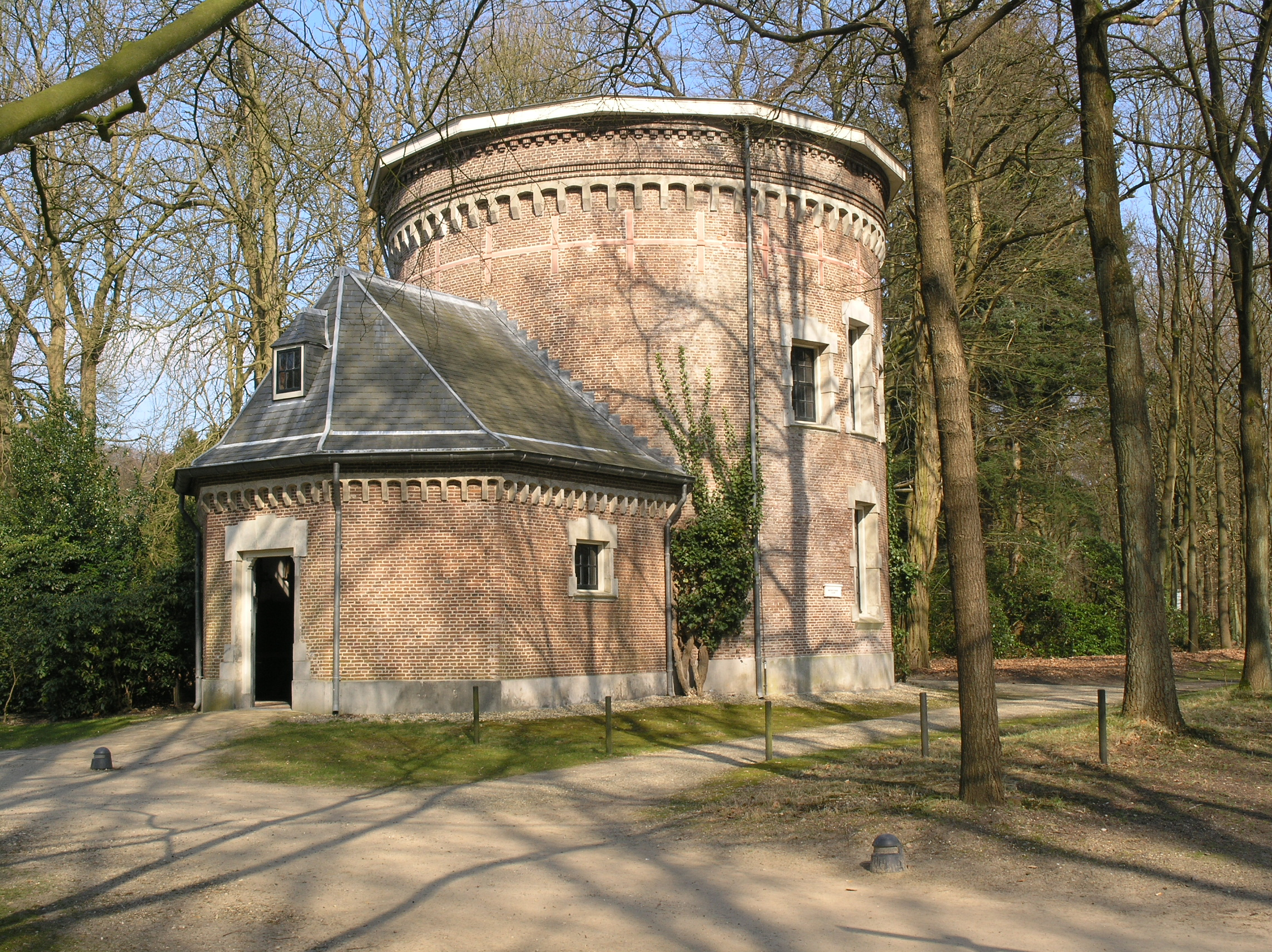
Water tower

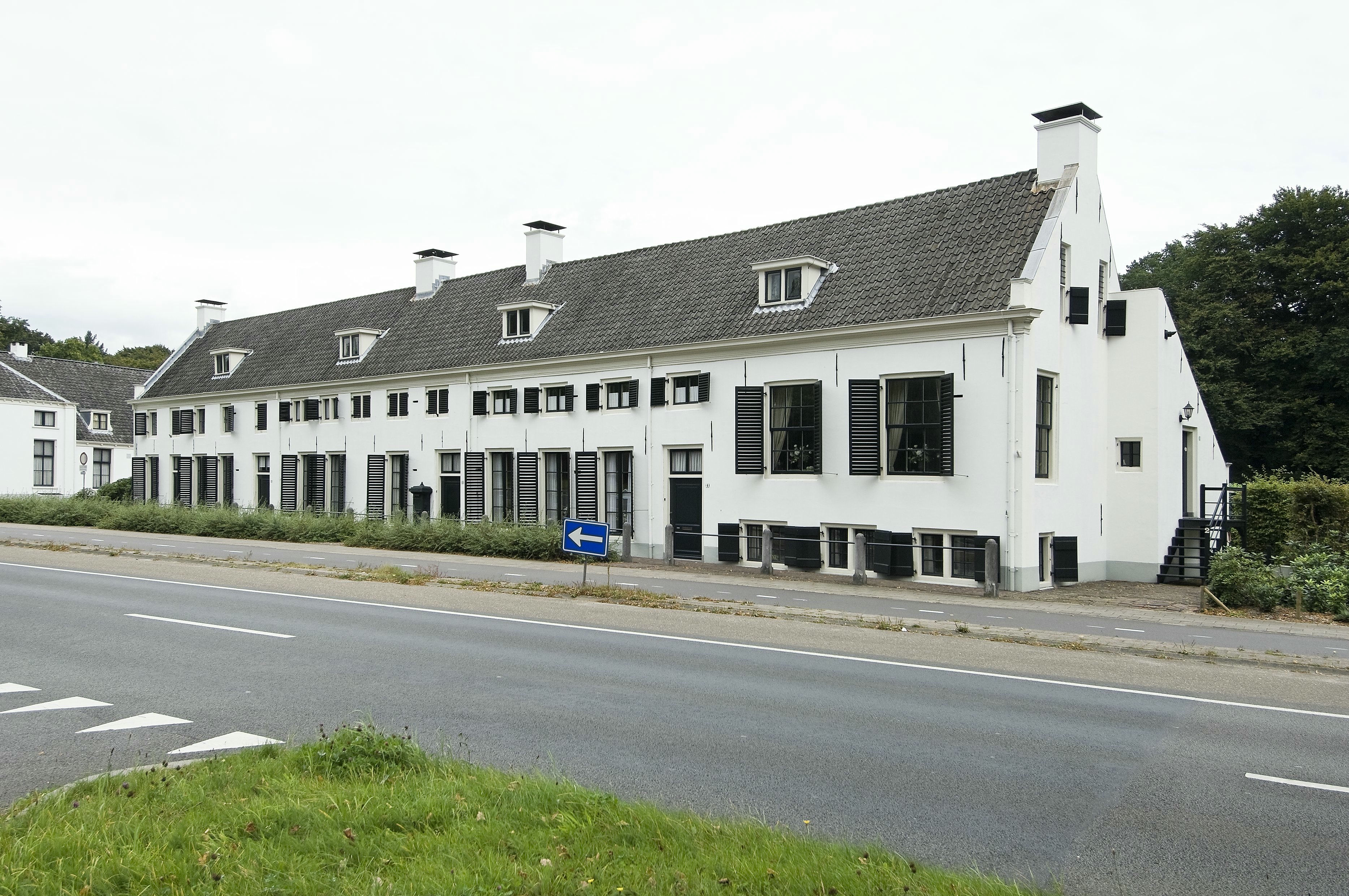
Residential homes for the workers at the palace

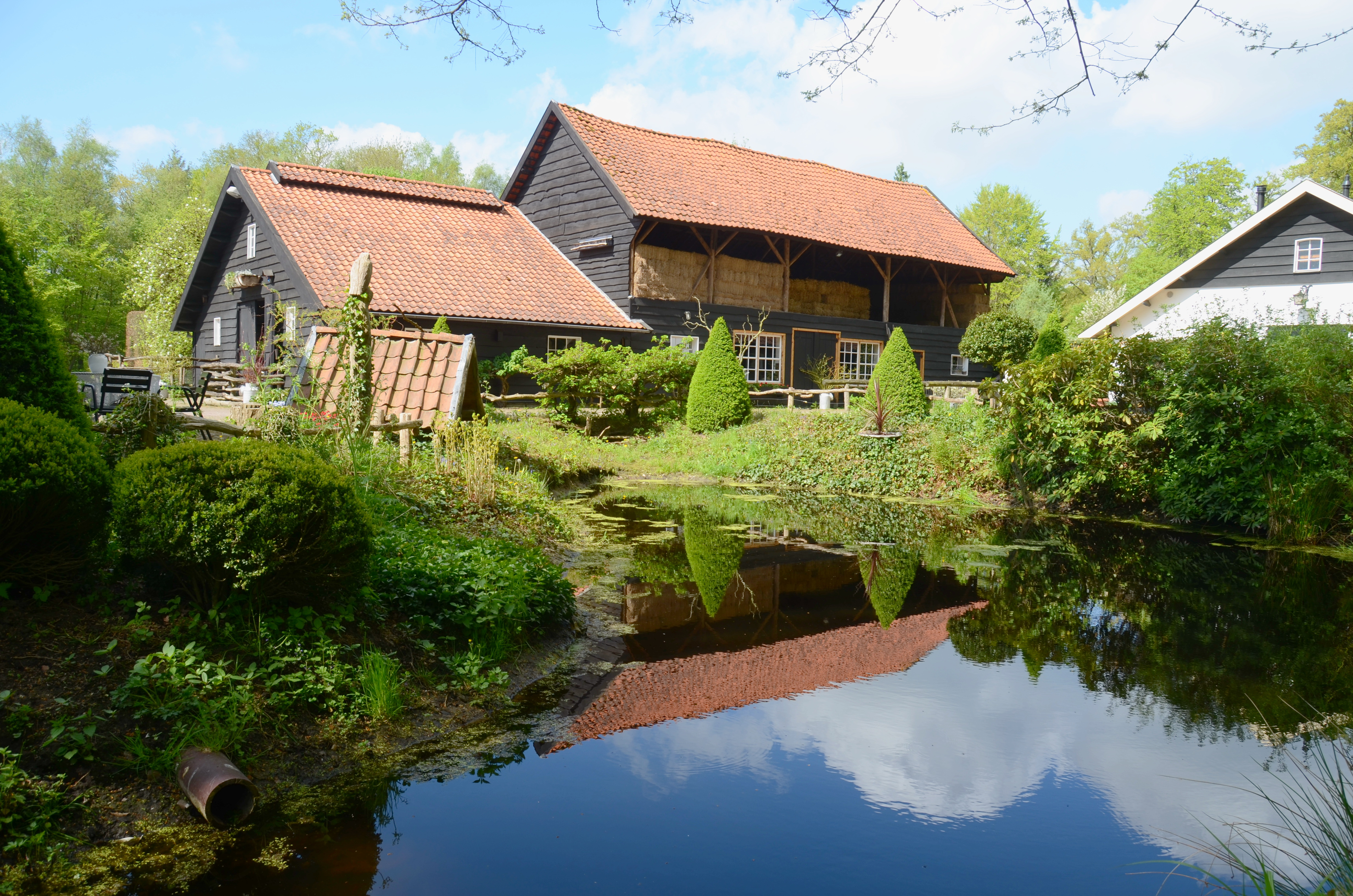
Equestrian facility in Soestdijk

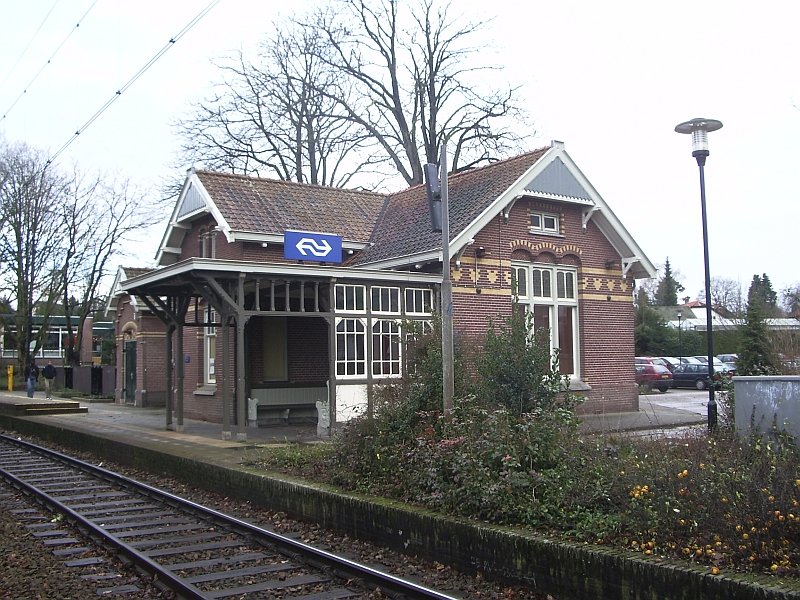
Soestdijk railway station
