= Onderdendam =

- Village
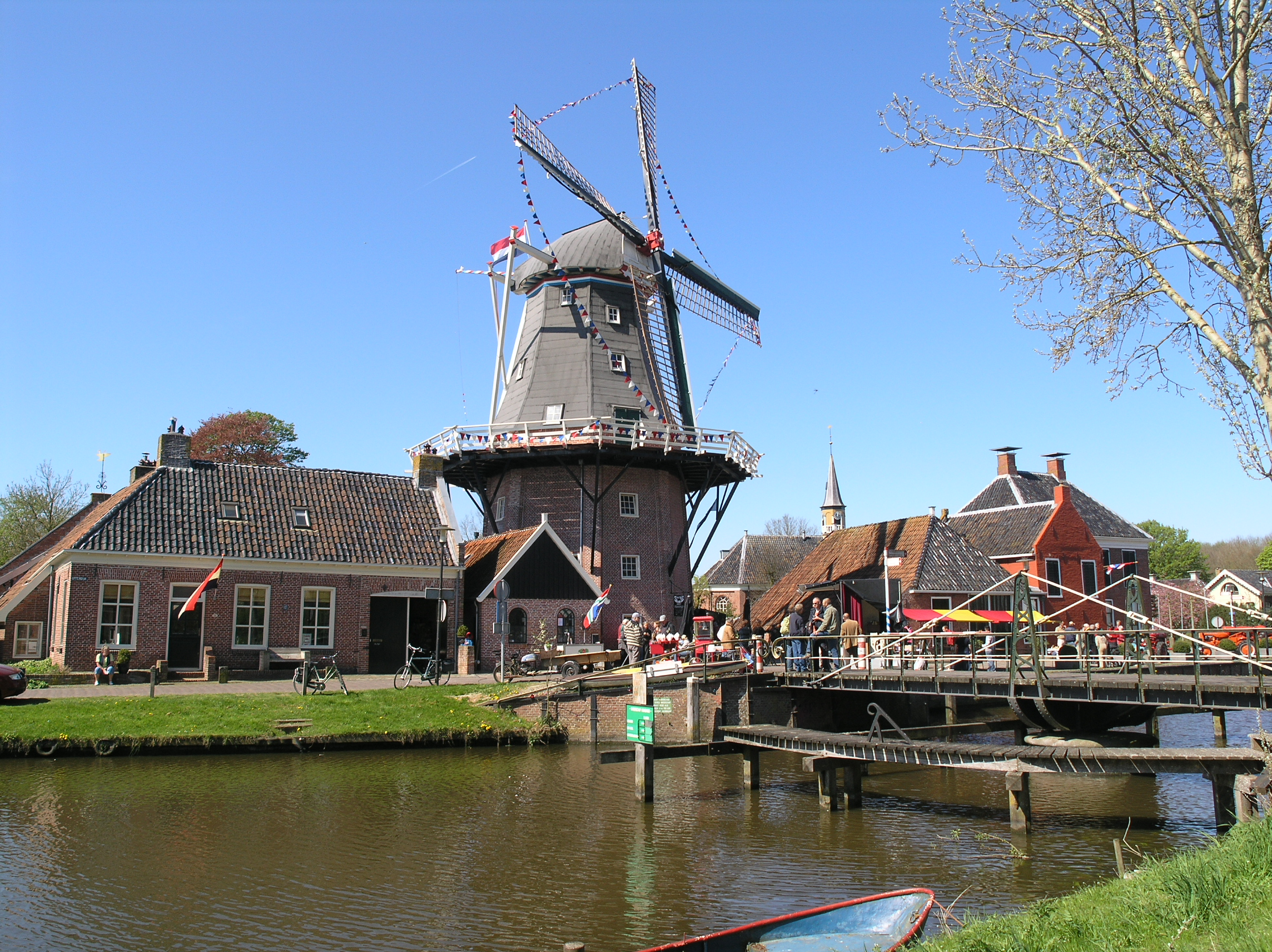
- Corn mill Hunsingo

- Location in the province of Groningen in the Netherlands Onderdendam (Netherlands)
- Country: Netherlands
- Province: Groningen
- Municipality: Het Hogeland

Area
  - Total: 6.00 km^{2} (2.32 sq mi)
- Elevation: 0.2 m (0.66 ft)

Population (2021)
  - Total: 575
  - Density: 95.8/km^{2} (248/sq mi)
- Time zone: UTC+1 (CET)
  - Summer (DST): UTC+2 (CEST)
- Postal code: 9959
- Dialing code: 050

Onderdendam is a village in Het Hogeland municipality in the province of Groningen, the Netherlands. It had a population of around 575 in 2021.

== History ==
The village is first mentioned in 1252 as "et ulderna domme". Even though it seemingly translates to "below the dam", the etymology is unclear. Onderdendam developed in the 16th and 17th century at the intersection of land- and waterways. In 1653, the Boterdiep was built which further enhanced its position, and it became a village of warehouses and traders.

The Dutch Reformed church is a small domed church built in 1840 as a replacement of the church of Onderwierum. The court house was built in 1804 as a wide white plastered building on the main street. Later it became an inn.

In 1811, Onderdendam became the capital of the municipality Bedum. Onderdendam was home to 498 people in 1840. Around 1900, Bedum started to outgrow Onderdendam.

Onderdendam was part of the municipality of Bedum until 2019 when it became part of the municipality of Het Hogeland.

== Gallery ==
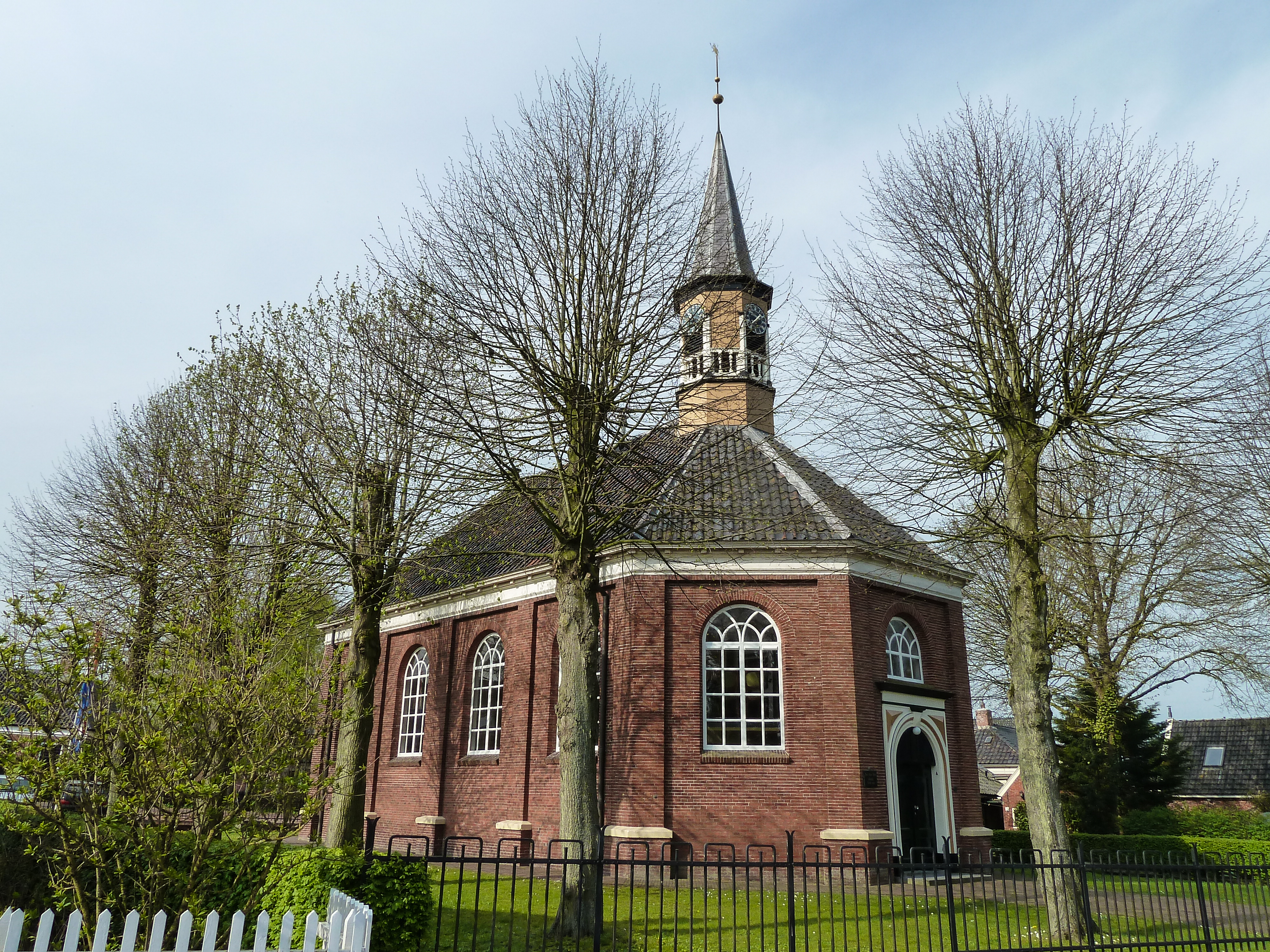
Dutch Reformed church

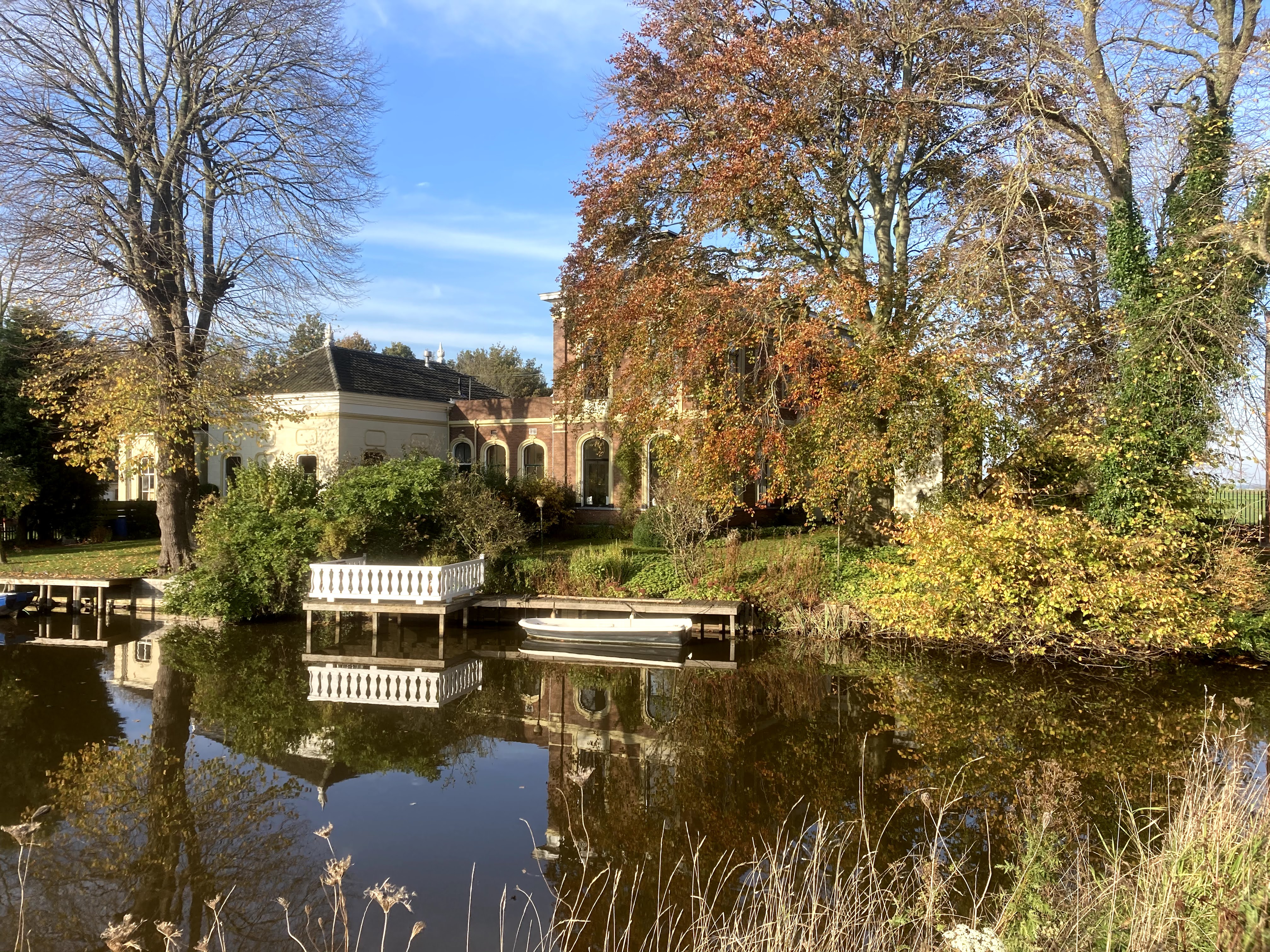
Canal view

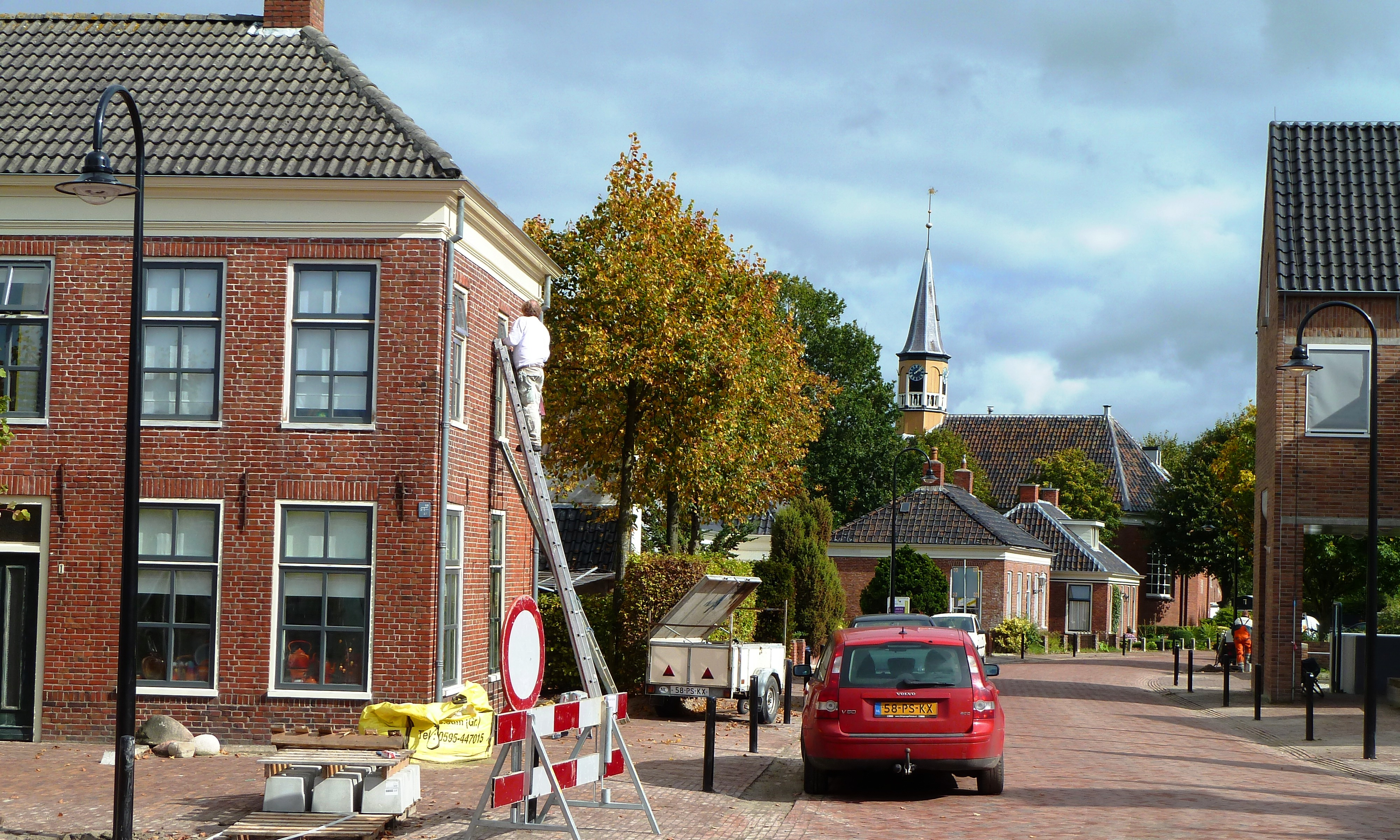
Street view

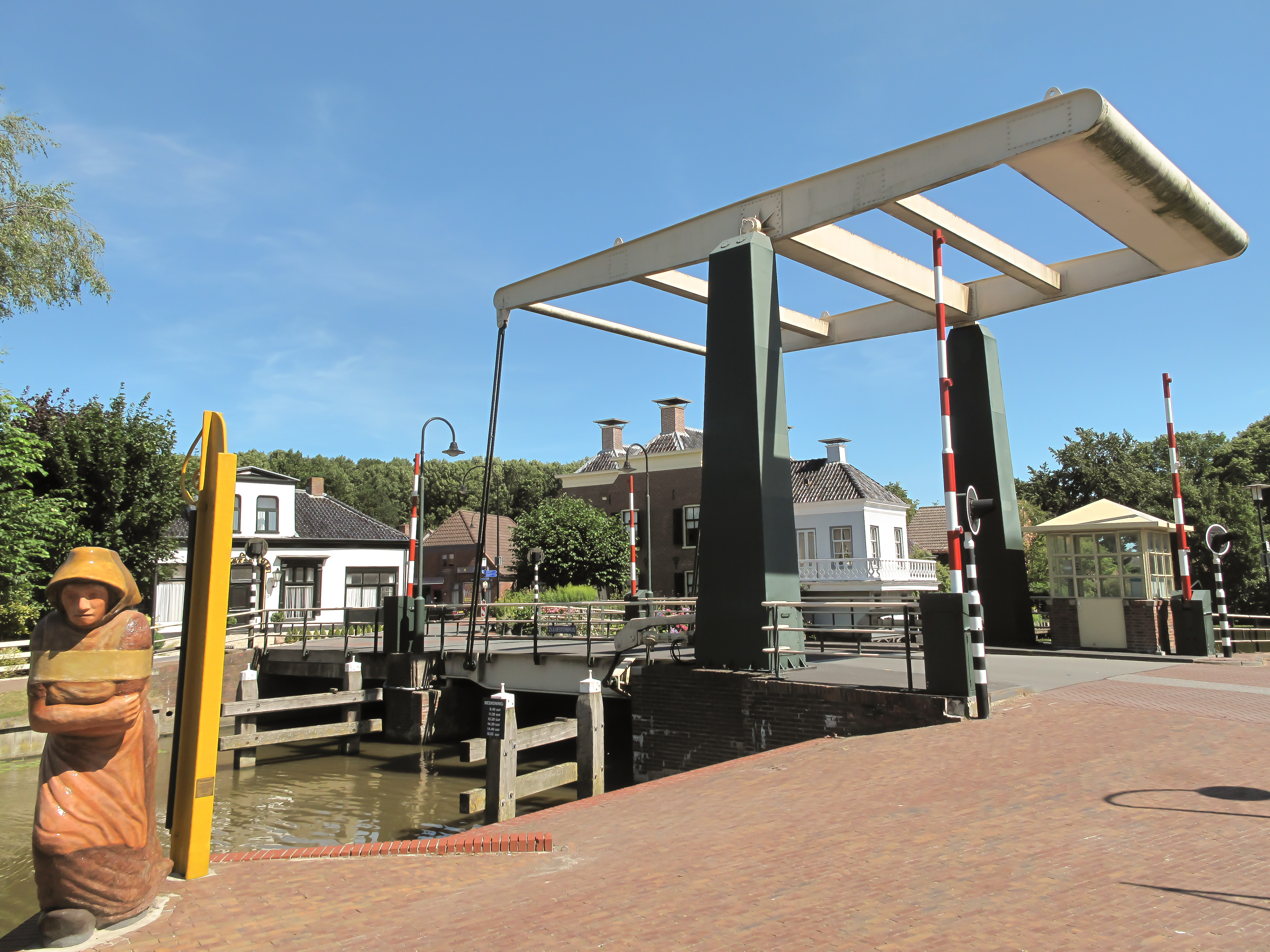
Draw bridge and het Jagertje statue
