= Leiden Draft =

Historical Dutch document

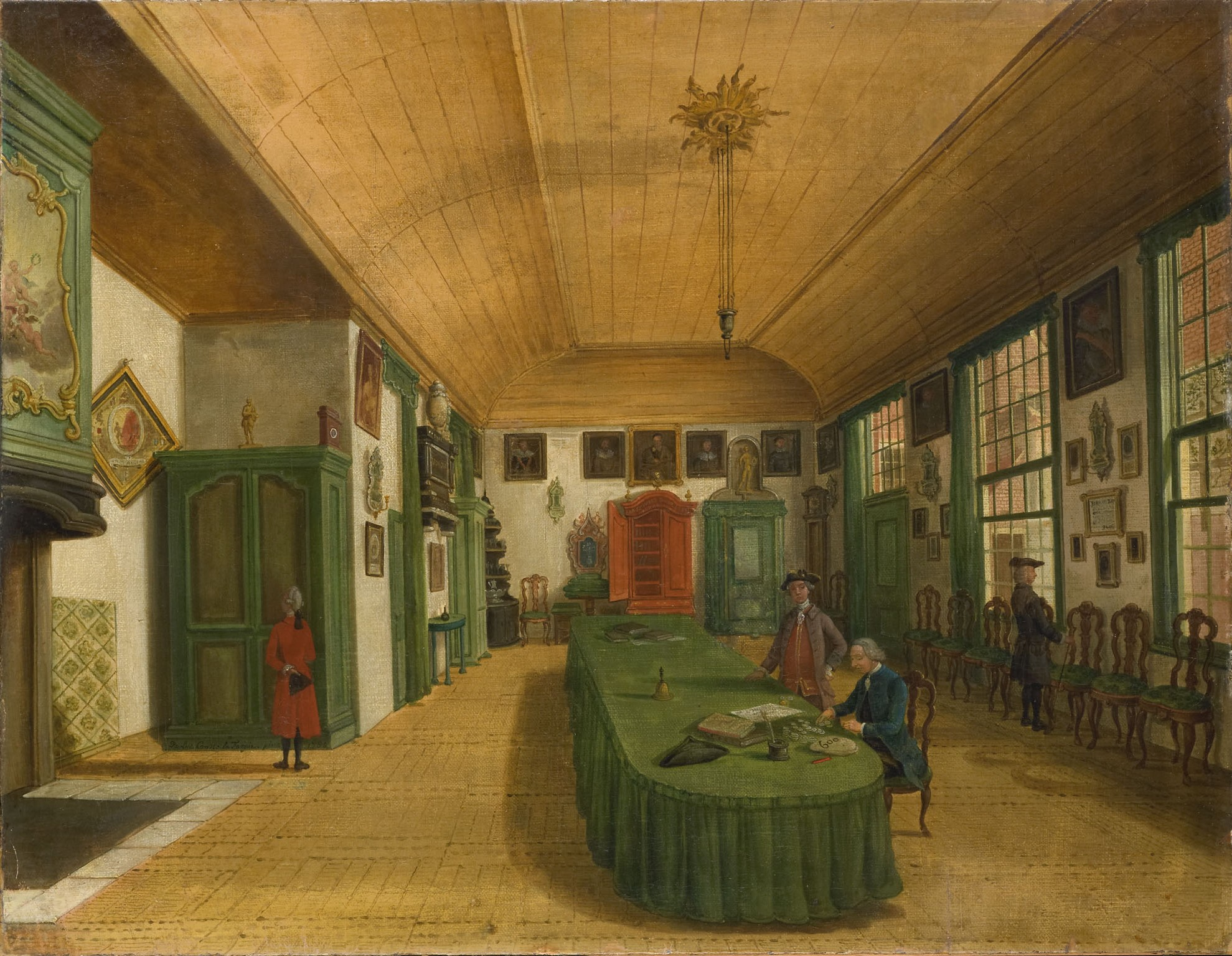
Paulus Constantijn la Fargue Meeting room of the Society Kunst wordt door Arbeid verkregen where the Leiden Draft was discussed on 8 October 1785

The Leiden Draft is the translation used in Anglophone historiography (Note: Cf. Schama, p. 95; Jourdan; and Israel, p. 1106, though Israel uses the translation "project" for "ontwerp") of the Dutch-language concept Leids Ontwerp, a draft-manifesto discussed by the Holland congress of representatives of exercitiegenootschappen (Patriot militias) on 8 October 1785 in Leiden in the context of the so-called Patriot revolution of 1785 in the Dutch Republic. This draft resulted in publication of the manifesto entitled Ontwerp om de Republiek door eene heilzaame Vereeniging van Belangen van Regent en Burger van Binnen Gelukkig en van Buiten Gedugt te maaken, Leiden, aangenomen bij besluit van de Provinciale Vergadering van de Gewapende Corpsen in Holland, op 4 oktober 1785 te Leiden (Design to make the Republic inwardly contented and outwardly feared by a salutary union of interests of Regent and Citizen). It contained an exposition of the Patriot ideology and arrived at the formulation of twenty proposals of political reform in a democratic vein.

The ideas were only realized to a large extent under the Batavian Republic, when they inspired the Dutch Declaration of the Rights of Man and the Citizen, but they were earlier also influential in the intellectual history of the French Revolution thanks to the French translation the journalist Antoine Marie Cerisier, a collaborator of Mirabeau, published in 1788. According to American and British historians Jeremy D. Popkin and Jonathan Israel this French translation may have influenced the French Declaration of the Rights of Man and of the Citizen.

== Background ==
The American Revolution made a deep impression in the Dutch Republic of the 1770s. Intellectuals like Joan Derk van der Capellen tot den Pol and his friend François Adriaan van der Kemp disseminated the ideas of Thomas Paine, Richard Price, Andrew Fletcher and Joseph Priestley, and generally news about the accomplishments of the American revolutionaries. On the one hand this helped convince Dutch public opinion to support the American Revolution, but on the other hand undermined the autocratic government of stadtholder William V and his Orangist party of Regenten. The public support of the American revolutionaries helped bring about an armed conflict with Great Britain, the Fourth Anglo-Dutch War, which was mishandled by the stadtholder to such an extent that the criticisms of his regime gained wide support under the population. His opponents were found in circles of the old anti-Orangist ("States party") faction among Dutch regents, and among adherents of democratic ideals. These came together as a political movement that called themselves "Patriots". As the stadtholder controlled the armed forces: the Dutch States Army and the Dutch Navy, the Patriots started to arm themselves by forming citizen militias, known as exercitiegenootschappen (so-called, because they liked to train themselves by the performance of military drills). These were local militias, overlaid by a federal association that bound them together and made them a national force to be reckoned with. The regime saw this as a threat and tried to discourage their operations where possible. On 23 July 1785 (as one example) the city government of Leiden prohibited the activities of the Leiden exercitiegenootschap and fined its drill master. This elicited a reaction by both the local and the provincial militia: they organised a congress of representatives of Holland militias that convened four times between 4 and 8 October 1785 in Leiden in the meeting room of the Society Kunst wordt door Arbeid verkregen (Art is the result of Labour), one of the Patriot clubs in Leiden

== Genesis of the manifesto ==
At this congress a draft of a manifesto was adopted that became known as the Leiden Ontwerp (which is often translated into English as "Leiden Draft" (Note: The Dutch word Ontwerp may be translated as both "draft" and "design". But in this case ontwerp may be used in both meanings, because the document was a draft of a political design of a new Dutch constitution.)). Who exactly wrote this draft was not entirely clear. However it is likely that the members of the commission that was charged by the congress with the writing of a final document, also had had a hand in the original draft. These were the journalist Wybo Fijnje, (Note: Wybo Fijnje was the brother-in-law of the Leiden publisher of the French-language Dutch newspaper Gazette de Leyde, Jean Luzac, a friend of American ambassador John Adams.) the Leiden textile manufacturer Pieter Vreede as president, and the Overijssel aristocrat Rutger Jan Schimmelpenninck and François Adriaan van der Kemp, less known are Jacob Blauw and Cornelis van Foreest. On 4 October 1785, after four sessions they edited the final draft that was published as Ontwerp om de Republiek door eene heilzaame Vereeniging van Belangen van Regent en Burger van Binnen Gelukkig en van Buiten Gedugt te maaken, aangenomen bij besluit van de Provinciale Vergadering van de Gewapende Corpsen in Holland (Design to make the Republic inwardly contented and outwardly feared by a salutary union of interests of Regent and Citizen, Leiden, adopted by resolution of the Provincial Assembly of the Armed Forces in Holland) by the publisher Leendert Herdingh. A new scheme was formulated for attractive and well paid urban and provincial offices. Colonels of the exercitiegenootschappen from Alkmaar and Westzaan were present. The design became so popular that in May 1786 a third edition was necessary. The journalist Gerrit Paape later wrote that a copy of the manifesto was in almost everybody's hand.

== Main points ==
In the 68 pages of the document first an exposition was given of the main ideas behind the "design" into which the argument issued. That argument may be summarized by giving the headings of the sections of the paper (in translation):

1. Necessity of the preservation of the originally good Constitution, by correction of the abuses that have slipped in
2. The stadtholderate not a sufficient means for the repair of the original Constitution
3. The detrimental and offensive fact of the independence of the Regents from the people, whose representatives they are
4. What has much contributed in later times to enlarge the detrimental effects of the independence of the Regents
5. Dangers to which the Regents are subject in case they don't want to enter into the project of reform
6. Dangers to which the independence of the Regents subjects the liberty of the Citizen
7. Advantages of this Reform for the Regents
8. Rights of the People in relation to Petitions
9. Necessity of the Constitutional Reform in relation to National Defense
10. Necessity of a Constitutional Reform for improvement of public morals and for economic growth
11. Conclusions from the above arguments as foundations of the Reform, and correct stipulation of everybody's rights

The argument resulted in an enumeration of twenty numbered articles:

I. Freedom is an inalienable right of all Dutch citizens. No power on Earth can impede them to make use of that Freedom
II. This Freedom would be illusory if it would not be founded on the right to be governed under laws to which the citizens have consented, either in person, or by their representatives
III. These representatives must not be independent of those they represent, and their appointment by the People according to a constant and regulated system is an appropriate means to prevent such independence
IV. The return of this right of appointment to the People must consist of either annual election by the People of municipal magistrates, or at least the nomination of the candidates from which the magistrates co-opt new members of the magistracy
V. Though sovereignty ultimately belongs to the People, for practical reasons government must be left to state colleges and departments. The People retain the right to influence government by petitions and addresses. To enable the People to do this in a reasoned form they have to be informed by a Free Press and have to enjoy Freedom of Expression  that may not be subject to prior restraint, though it may subject to judicial sanction after the fact
VI. Everywhere the Regents promote this Constitutional Reform they may not be deprived arbitrarily of their existing offices, unless those offices contravene this new Constitution, or one person holds two incompatible offices
VII. The People will have to leave the officers they have elected to do their job during their time in office and to give them their trust
VIII. The officers of the Municipal Militias will be elected by their members and in case the regulations declare government and military offices incompatible, those regulations will be scrupulously observed
IX. Nobody will be eligible for government office who has not served in a militia
X. Citizen-commissioners will be appointed to audit the public accounts and to guarantee the exercise of rights
XI. There will be regular accounts of the Public Finances on all government levels
XII. Citizen-commissioners will have the right and duty to investigate matters concerning industry and trade and to recommend policies pertaining to those matters to the government
XIII. Citizen-commissioners will not step down from their posts all at once, but only a part of the membership will be renewed periodically
XIV. Though the state has to make expenditures for the maintenance of infrastructure and those expenditures must therefore not suffer undue austerity, the People have the right to demand the abolition of useless and costly institutions and practices, with just compensation for the holders of the abolished rights and offices
XV. The electors of Magistrates must be the members of the militias, unless this right of election belonged to the Guilds
XVI. To avoid the problem of electors selling their vote, the right of election will be reserved to people with a certain position of wealth, depending on local circumstances
XVII. Regulations may be made as to the qualifications of both electors and their representatives
XVIII. Petty offices should preferentially be given to people of exemplary behavior, military veterans, and people originating locally (instead of people from abroad)
XIX. Civic militias should be promoted so as to support the Army against foreign enemies and to oppose that Army in case it becomes the instrument of domestic tyranny
XX. To serve those two purposes the citizens should be divided in three classes, whose members, selected by drawing lots, will have to serve in the militia in rotation

== Influence ==
A close reading of the Design will teach that the editors of the document revered the existing "constitution" of the Dutch Republic (in the sense of a body of foundational charters and treaties, like the Great Privilege, the Pacification of Ghent, the Union of Utrecht, the Twelve Years' Truce, and the Peace of Münster), but rejected a number of "abuses" that had recently "slipped in" like the so-called Regeringsreglementen (Government Regulations) that had been adopted in the course of the Orangist Revolution of 1747 to give the stadtholder a right of appointment, or at least approval, of city magistrates. The Patriots wanted to roll back these recent reforms and replace them with the right of the citizenry, just below the caste of Regenten, but above the "lower classes," to elect those magistrates, or at least nominate candidates for co-option by the vroedschappen that traditionally had the right to elect them. In other words, they implicitly accepted the existing "constitution", with its special political rights for the Regenten, but put a new reading on it, "clawing back" so to speak the "ancient" rights of the guilds and schutterijen to influence local government, and through its intermediary, regional and national government. To justify this they proclaimed a popular sovereignty that was to replace the sovereignty claimed by the provincial States and the States-General (another of those "abuses", as the sovereignty of the States was always supposed to be derived from "the People").

The Leiden Draft therefore was not only a declaration of principles, but also a political program of overturning, not the political structure of the Republic, but the composition of the personnel occupying the magistracy with the use of more or less "democratic" elections. The Patriots soon started to put this program in execution, beginning in the city of Utrecht where the old government was replaced with a democratically elected one. Soon other city governments in especially Holland, Utrecht province, Overijssel and Friesland went over to the Patriot side, usually, however, by having Orangist regents replaced by adherents of the old States party, whose families had been driven out in 1747, but had taken up the explicit invitation in the Leiden Draft to cast their lot with the democrats. Sometimes, however, even those old-style regents were replaced by representatives of the middle-class citizenry (like in Utrecht, Leiden, Delft and Rotterdam), breaching the traditional monopoly of political office of the Regent class. This "attack" on their position started to disturb the Patriot regents, who gradually started to drift away from their more radically "democratic" brethren in the Patriot movement. But the wave of democratic reform seemed unstoppable when in the Summer of 1787 the Amsterdam vroedschap was overturned after large street demonstrations of the local Patriot clubs and the Patriot exercitiegenootschap. This went too far for the old-style regents, a number of whom started to move over to the camp of the stadtholder. However, it took military intervention by the king of Prussia, brother of the wife of the stadtholder and hence his brother-in-law, to suppress what had become the Patriot Revolution in the Fall of 1787. After this the personnel changes in the city governments and the States were reversed and the post-1747 system restored, in a more severe form, under the 1788 Act of Guarantee that seemed to cast the stadtholderate in stone.

The Patriot Revolution therefore seemed to be stopped in its tracks, and rolled back, but that did not imply that the influence of the Leiden Draft also had forever dissipated. The 1770s and 1780s were a time of intensive contact and exchange of ideas across European frontiers by like-minded intellectuals. Among those involved were the French journalist Antoine-Marie Cerisier, who had been in the center of the Patriot Revolution, and therefore, like many other leading Patriots had to go into exile in France. There he became a close collaborator of Mirabeau, the trailblazer of the French Revolution, who took a keen interest in political developments in the Dutch Republic. (Note: Mirabeau wrote a pamphlet, entitled Aux Bataves sur le stadhouderat in 1788, in which he articulated part of a declaration of rights and commented on the suppression of the Patriot Revolution and advised the bataves to try again soon; Cf. Jourdan) Cerisier did not write the Leiden Draft himself as Popkin has it, (Note: Jeremy Popkin, Dutch Patriots, French Journalists and Declaration of Rights: the leidse ontwerp of 1785 and its Diffusion in France, The Historical Journal, vol. 38 (1995): pp. 553-65; but Popkin later acknowledged that Cerisiers role was less important in the writing of the Leiden Draft; Cf. Jeremy D. Popkin, Antoine-Marie Cerisier; le Leidse Ontwerp et le Grondwettige Herstelling un debat encore ouvert in: De Achttiende Eeuw, vol. 29, no. 1 (1997), pp. 17-34) but excerpted it in French in an article in Analyse des Papiers Anglais in 1788. According to Popkin, who conducted extensive archival research into the matter, this excerpt eventually influenced the formulation of the Déclaration des droits de l'homme et du citoyen of 1789, one of the foundational documents of the French Revolution. In a 2007 oration, Jonathan Israel supported this thesis.

And so the "path of influence" of the Leiden Draft eventually doubled back to the Netherlands, because the exiled Patriots returned with the triumphant armies of the Revolutionary French Republic in 1795 and this time definitively overturned the old Dutch Republic and its institutions. Again, the political method of the Leiden Draft program was used by working ostensibly "within" the old constitution, by taking over the personnel of the old institutions like the States of Holland that was in a "constitutional" way replaced by the Provisional Representatives of the People of Holland, and the States-General that for a while became the States General of the Batavian Republic, before it legislated itself out of existence at the end of 1795 to be replaced by the National Assembly of the Batavian Republic. One of the first official acts of the Provisional Representatives was the promulgation of the Dutch Declaration of the Rights of Man and the Citizen, that was drawn up by a commission, chaired by Pieter Paulus, which certainly took the Leiden Draft into account as one of its inspirations.

== Sources ==
- Jourdan, A., The "Alien Origins" of the French Revolution: American, Scottish, Genevan, and Dutch Influences, in: J. of the Western Society for French History, vol. 35 (2007)
- Israel, J.I. (1995), The Dutch Republic: Its Rise, Greatness and Fall, 1477-1806, Oxford University Press,ISBN 0-19-873072-1 hardback, ISBN 0-19-820734-4 paperback
- Ontwerp om de Republiek door eene heilzaame Vereeniging van Belangen van Regent en Burger van Binnen Gelukkig en van Buiten Gedugt te maaken, Leiden, aangenomen bij besluit van de Provinciale Vergadering van de Gewapende Corpsen in Holland, op 4 oktober 1785 te Leiden (in Dutch)
- Postma, J., Het Leids ontwerp. Mythen en Feiten, in: Openbaar Bestuur, vol. 18, no. 11 (November 2008), pp. 38–40 (in Dutch)
- Schama, S. (1977), Patriots and Liberators. Revolution in the Netherlands 1780-1813, New York, Vintage books, ISBN 0-679-72949-6
