= Isaac Lodewijk la Fargue van Nieuwland =

Dutch painter (1726–1805)

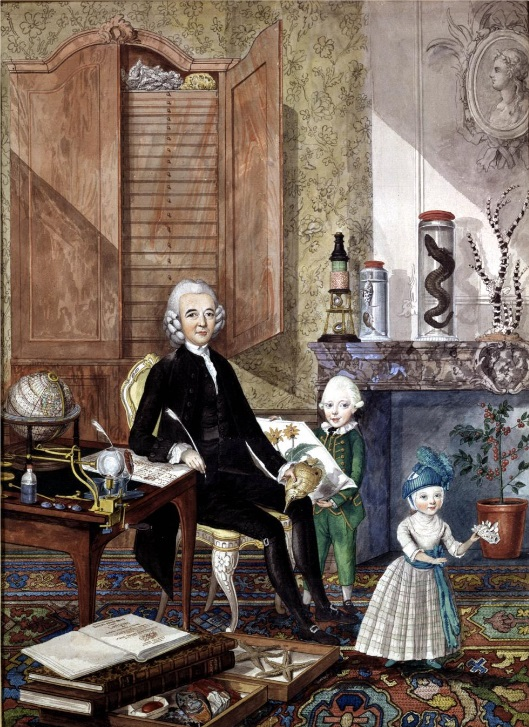
Portrait of the naturalist Laurentius Theodorus Gronovius with his two sons, Johannes and Samuel

Isaac Lodewijk la Fargue van Nieuwland (1726–1805) was an 18th-century painter from the Dutch Republic.

== Biography ==
He was born in The Hague to Jan Thomas la Fargue and was the younger brother of Paulus Constantijn la Fargue. His other siblings Maria Margaretha, Karel and Jacob Elias also became painters. In 1768 he became a member of the Confrerie Pictura. He engraved some of the portraits in the Tooneel der uitmuntende schilders van Europa, a dictionary of painters that was illustrated by his brother Paulus Constantijn. Perhaps because of this work, he is known more for portraits than landscapes. He died in The Hague.

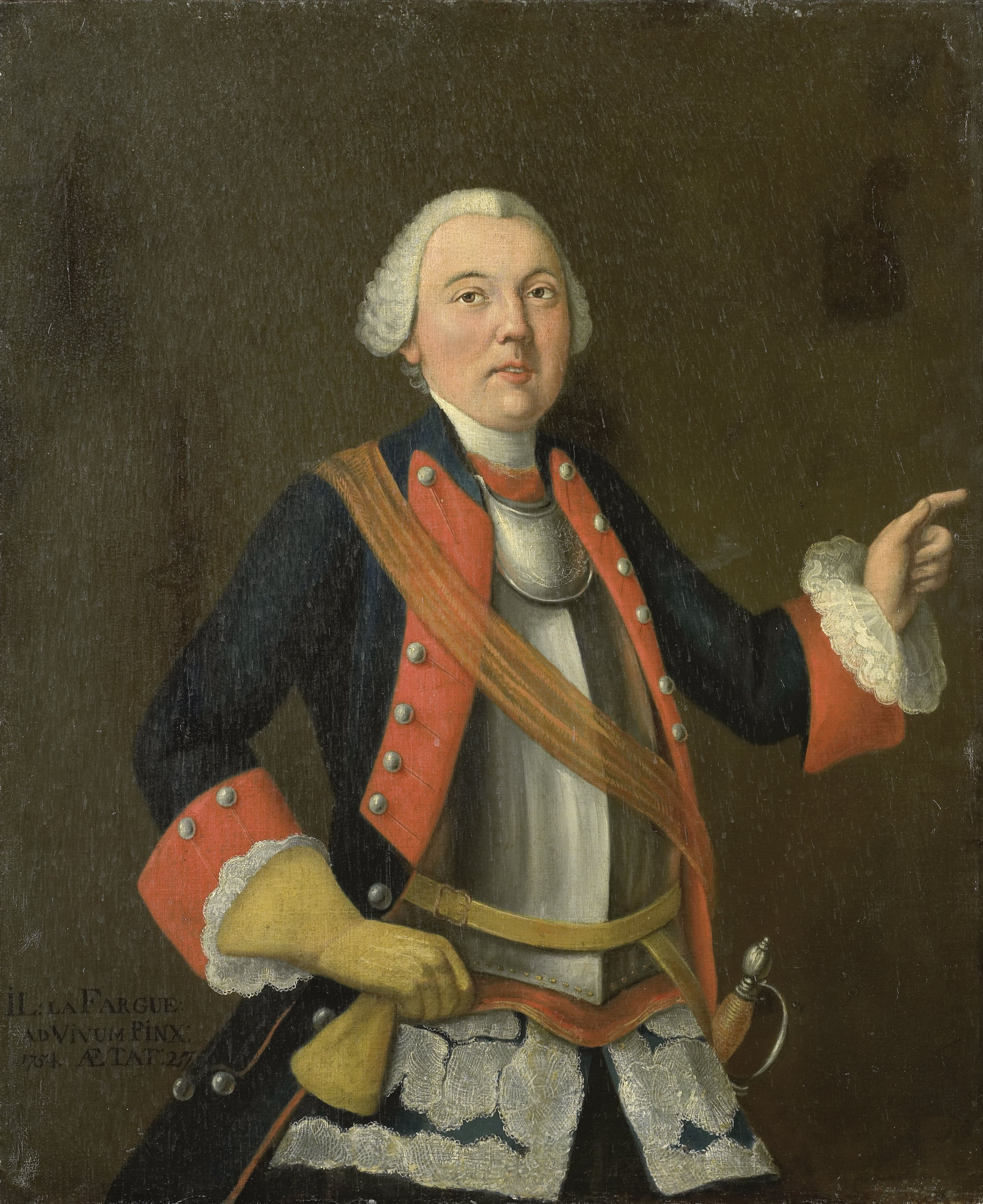
Jan Hendrik van Rijswijk

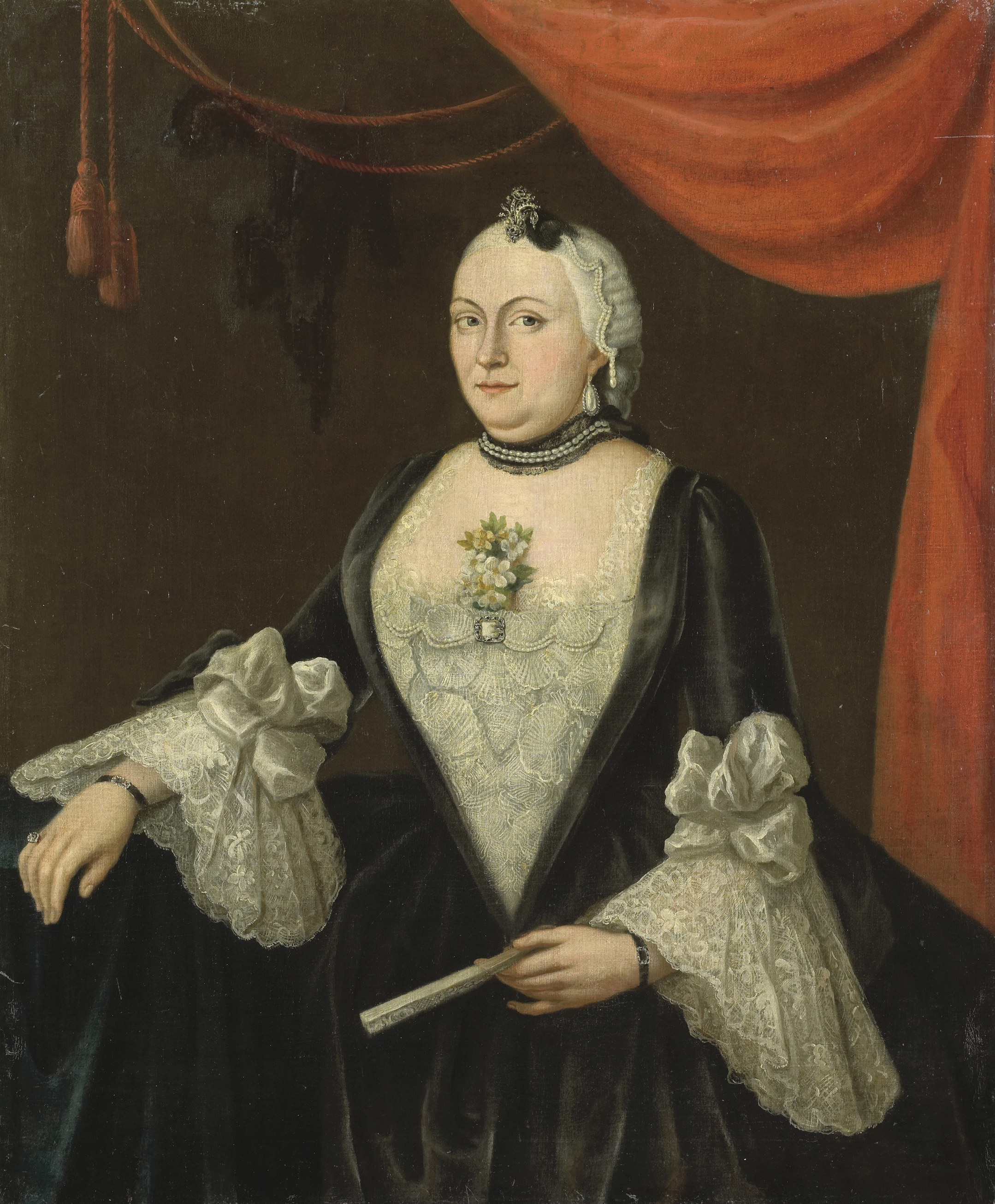
Johanna van Rijswijk

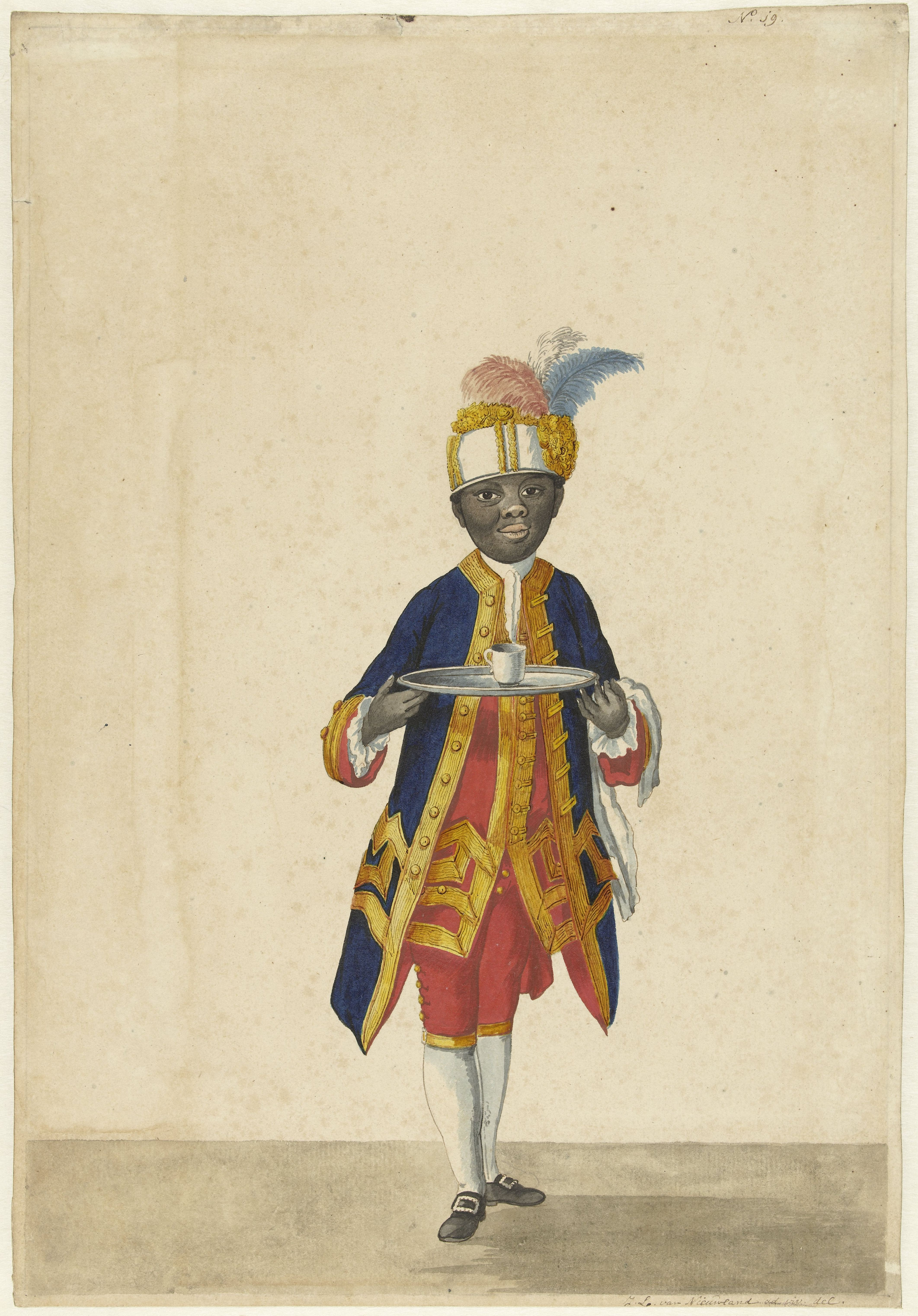
A Servant (probably Guan Anthony Sideron) (1766)
