= Karel la Fargue =

Dutch painter

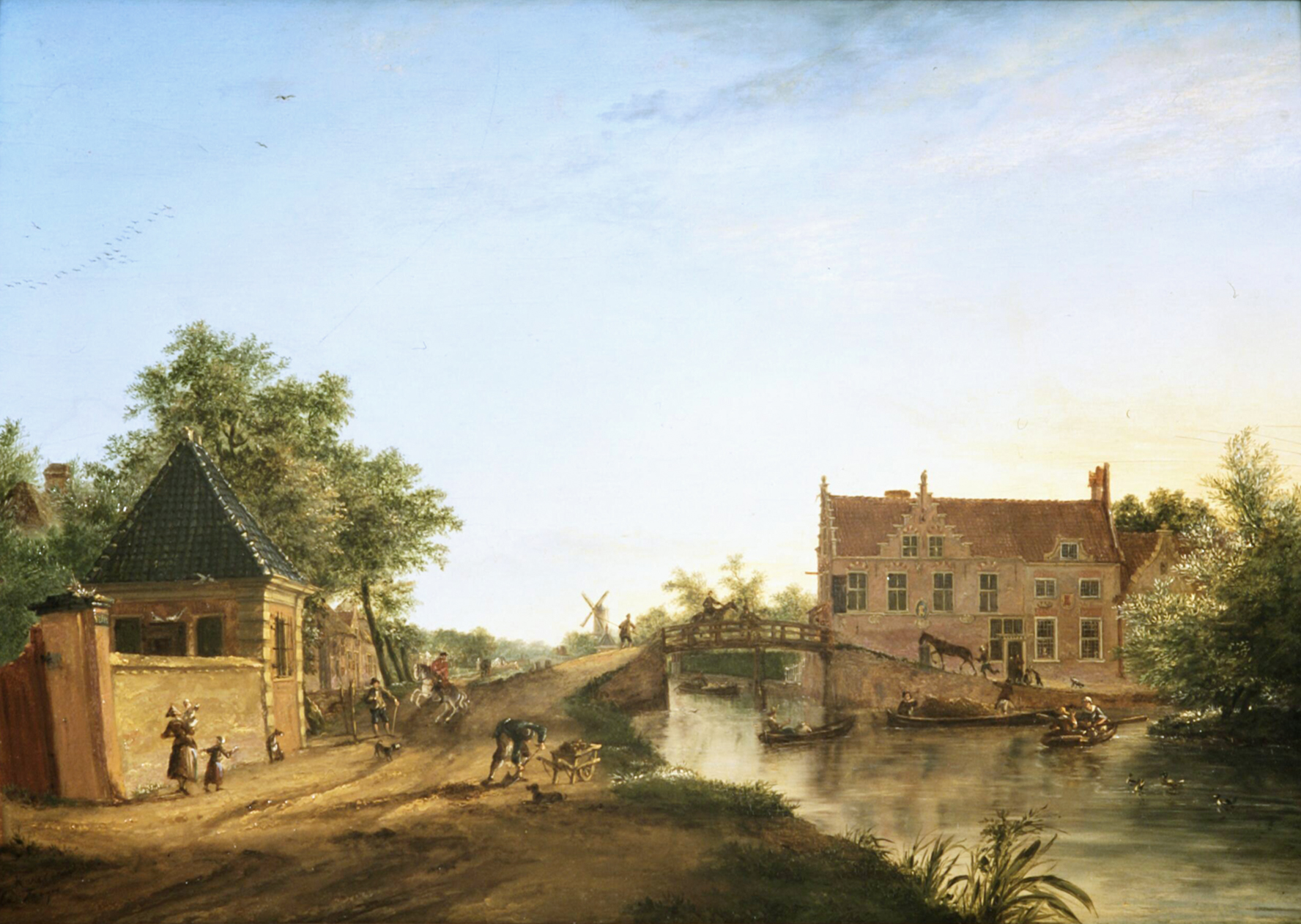
View of Burchvliet House and the new toll bridge at Rijswijk

Karel la Fargue (1738–1793) was an 18th-century painter from the Dutch Republic.

He was born in The Hague to Jan Thomas la Fargue and was the younger brother of Paulus Constantijn la Fargue. His other siblings Maria Margaretha, Jacob Elias and Isaac Lodewijk also became painters. In 1768 he became a member of the Confrerie Pictura, along with his brother Isaac. Like his older brother, he is known for topographical views. He died in The Hague.

More than 200 years after his death, he was unmasked in 1998 as a prolific forger of seventeenth-century Dutch drawings, as described in the magazine Oud Holland.
