= Brest Affair =

Political event in 18th-century Netherlands

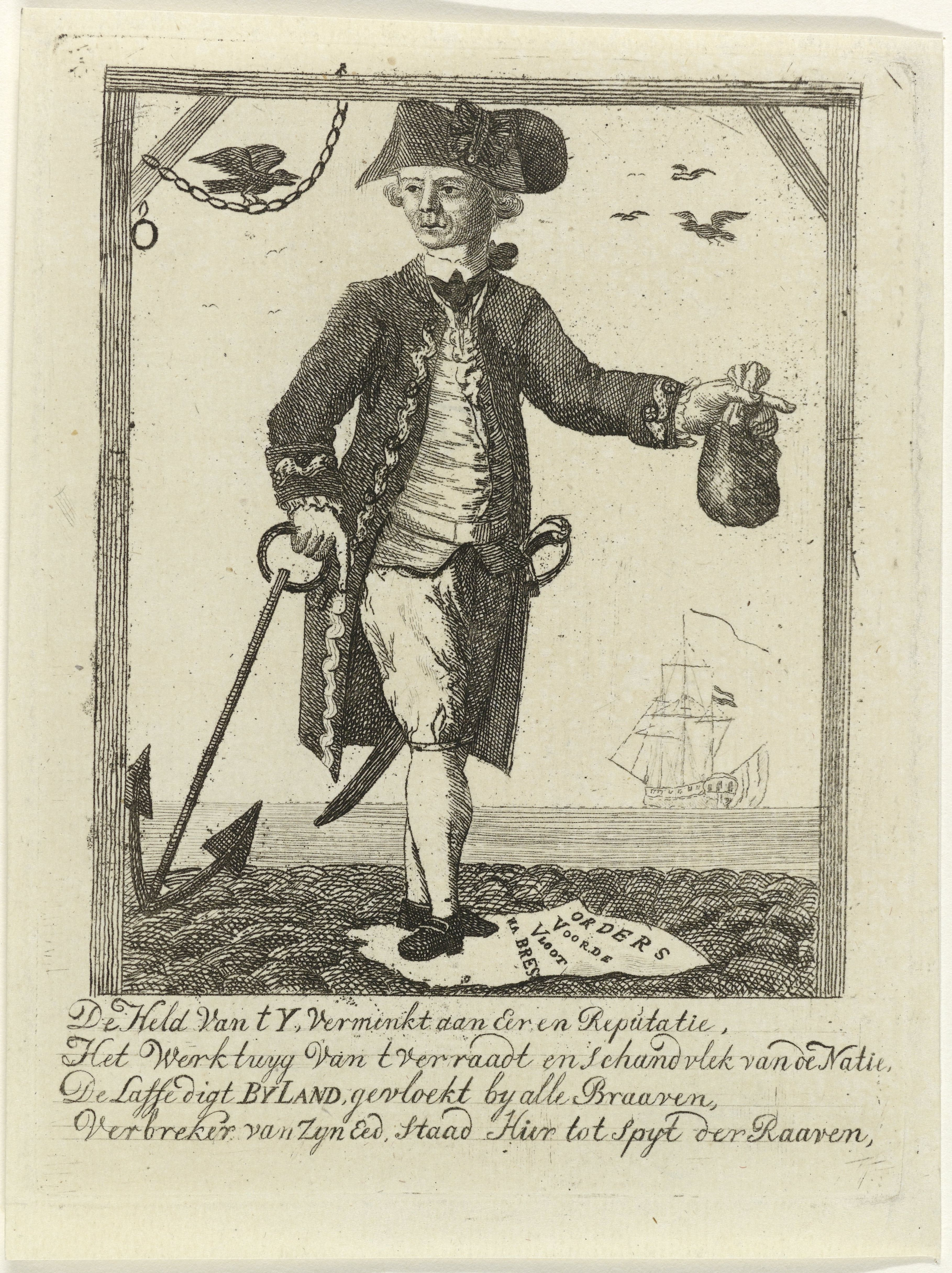
A cartoon of Admiral Lodewijk van Bylandt October 1782

The Brest Affair, also known as the (Failed) Expedition to Brest, is the historiographical designation of a scandal during the Patriottentijd that was exploited by the Patriot faction to politically undermine the regime of stadtholder William V. It followed the refusal of the leadership of the navy of the Dutch Republic to obey a direct order to send a flotilla to the French naval base of Brest before 8 October 1783. The refusal caused a scandal that forced the States General to institute a formal inquiry into the circumstances surrounding the refusal, and this inquiry eventually led to a prosecution before a special admiralty court of the parties responsible, led by Pieter Paulus. However, the prosecution took so long that the Patriot faction was meanwhile suppressed by Prussian military intervention, so that eventually the case was shelved without coming to a resolution.

== Background ==
After the outbreak of the Fourth Anglo-Dutch War in December 1780 the Dutch Republic became informally involved in the American Revolutionary War on the side of France and its allies, without, however, a formal alliance being formed. On the initiative of the Amsterdam delegation in the States of Holland the States General resolved in early 1782 to come to some kind of arrangement with France to at least discuss a common strategy in the sea war, which became known as the Concert. This proposition was accepted by the French with some alacrity, as in their eyes the Dutch military resources, especially the Dutch fleet, lay fallow in the roadstead of the Texel. When in September 1782 a large British fleet under Admiral Howe departed for besieged Gibraltar in an effort to relieve that stronghold, thereby denuding the English Channel of Royal Navy forces, the French marquis de Castries saw a chance to kill two birds with one stone, and wrote a memorandum for the French minister of foreign affairs, Vergennes, in which he proposed that the Dutch should take this opportunity to safely pass through the English Channel to send a flotilla of ships of the line to the French naval base of Brest, to use that as a permanent base for both its own operations in the Dutch East Indies (where the flotilla might turn the balance of military power in that theater of the war against the British, in combination with French naval units), and for combined naval operations with French and Spanish fleets in the area of the English Channel, to obtain a naval superiority there. (Note: Cf. Memorandum, Observations sur les circonstances actuelles relativement a la Hollande (14 September 1782), in Colenbrander, appendix 10, pp. 395-397)

Vergennes the next day instructed the French ambassador in the Republic, Vauguyon to put that proposal before the Dutch stadtholder, in his capacity of Admiral-General of the Dutch navy, which happened on 22 September. The stadtholder (as always hesitant) involved the Dutch Grand Pensionary Pieter van Bleiswijk who was immediately enthusiastic and put the question to the secret besogne (committee) for naval affairs of the States General, where the maritime provinces were in favor right away, but (as usual) the land provinces needed more convincing, causing a delay until 3 October, before a definitive decision was made to send a flotilla of ten ships of the line and several frigates. Meanwhile, the States General received secret intelligence that the siege of Gibraltar was about to be raised, which made it likely that Admiral Howe would return sooner than expected, so that the favorable circumstances for moving the Dutch flotilla to Brest appeared to be soon past. This motivated the States General to amend their resolution in the sense that the flotilla had to depart no later than 8 October.

== The non-event ==
The Dutch naval top (admirals Zoutman and Reynst), who had been involved in an advisory capacity, were opposed to the plan, but their advice was ignored. The Admiral General had on 30 September already sent a secret order to the admiral commanding the Texel squadron (Andries Hartsinck) to make preparations for a speedy departure in case the order would be formally given, and the admiral had thus instructed his captains, without, however, telling them the reason. When the formal resolution was made on 3 October the Admiral General sent two letters with the formal order to Hartsinck and Vice-Admiral Lodewijk van Bylandt, the officer designated to command the flotilla. Hartsinck only received the letter on 5 October, but van Bylandt was absent that day, because he had departed on 3 October, together with his second-in-command, Rear-Admiral Van Hoey, for The Hague. Van Bylandt hoped to persuade the stadtholder and Admiral-General at the last moment to desist of giving the order, or to withdraw it. So he was rather embarrassed when he heard on 4 October that the order had already been sent and that he was to depart within three days with the flotilla as its commander. Nevertheless, he did his best to convince the stadtholder in an interview on the evening of 4 October (of which nothing is known with certainty as both Van Bylandt and William have always refused to divulge the details). It seems likely, according to the Dutch naval historian Johannes Cornelis de Jonge that van Bylandt presented the following arguments. Firstly, the fleet was not ready to depart at short notice, due to lack of provisions, and disrepair of the ships. Secondly, he brought the political argument to the table, that the stadtholder and the navy were already accused of cowardice in the war with Great Britain, and of possible collusion with the enemy, and that any mishap therefore would be used to further those accusations. Thirdly, he made clear that he personally could not, and would not execute the order to depart with the flotilla in the given circumstances. The stadtholder did not directly confront van Bylandt about this refusal, but deflected the matter to the Grand Pensionary that same evening. Van Bleiswijk apparently was convinced, at least according to van Bylandt, and more or less seems to have given permission to ignore the order. The stadtholder, however, decided after consulting with the representatives of the Admiralty of Amsterdam, Van der Hoop, and of Rotterdam, Bisdom, to persist with the order and to send the two flag officers to the Texel to execute it.

Van Bylandt therefore departed for the Texel, but could not board Hartsinck's flagship before 7 October, due to inclement weather. Harsinck told him that he had convened his captains on 5 October in a council of war, presented them with the order of the States General to send the flotilla, and asked them whether such an order in their opinion could be executed at such short notice (i.e. before 8 October). The captains had replied unanimously that this was impossible, due to the state of the ships and the lack of provisions. Van Bylandt felt understandably justified by this news in his refusal to execute the order, but asked Hartsinck to convene a conference with the other flag officers present at the Texel, to ask for their opinion in the matter. The flag officers then stated in a written declaration, signed by all, that the order could not be executed in the given circumstances, and this declaration was sent to the Admiral General. The stadtholder then presented this declaration, together with the rest of the correspondence he received from Admiral Hartsinck, to the Grand Pensionary, and later to the members of the committee for naval affairs of the States General, and the latter decided a few days later to withdraw the order to send the flotilla to Brest, as the deadline of 8 October, mentioned in that order, had already passed. which made the whole project moot. The planned "expedition" therefore was a non-event; it never happened.

== The scandal ==
The refusal to sail caused a furor in the Republic. (Note: See for an example the anonymous pamphlet De XXX Artikelen (The Thirty Articles), mentioned in the Sources) The Patriot press in the first place doubted if the lack of readiness of the ships was indeed the true reason for the refusal to depart, (Note: Admiral Van Bylandt was accused of having boasted in Hague coffee houses that he did not want to follow the orders of his political superiors ("even if it cost him his head") and that he did not want to work with the French. Van Bylandt denied that he had said such things in public places like coffee houses, but remained vague about whether he may have said such things at all; Cf. de Jonge, p. 620, note 1) but even if this was true, this opened the more important question: why was the fleet not ready, and who was responsible? The first to pose these questions was the Personnel Commission of the States of Holland, who approached the stadtholder a few days after the non-event. He at first refused point blank to give the required information, and when the full States forced him to reply, he was very terse in the information he provided. Then the States of Friesland demanded in impolite terms to get Answers from "their" Admiral General (which he wasn't in a formal sense (Note: Though one usually speaks of the stadtholder of the Dutch Republic, actually each of the seven provinces had its own stadtholder, who was also Captain-General of its armed forces (and Admiral General of its fleet, for the maritime provinces), though since 1747 these provincial offices were all held by the same person. The provincial stadtholder was the "first servant" of the provincial States, who held sovereign power in their province (a fact that the Patriots did not grow tired of reminding the stadtholder of). However, under the provisions of the Union of Utrecht the provinces had pooled their armed forces and delegated their sovereignty in matters of defense and foreign affairs to the States General, who therefore were the true superior of the Admiral General/stadtholder.)), which he did in a brief statement, that did not satisfy the Frisian States. They therefore approached all other provincial States with the proposal to convene a conference, outside the States General, to discuss the state of the country's defense. Meanwhile, the admiralty colleges of Amsterdam and Rotterdam, not without reason afraid that they would be held at least partially responsible for the derelict state of the fleet, came with a public defense of their conduct in the matter of the fleet's logistics. In the general clamor for an inquest into the causes of the fleet's failure to comply with direct orders, the States of Holland took the initiative to require from the States General that that august body would indeed institute such an inquest. Pensionary Cornelis de Gijselaar of the city of Dordrecht demanded on 4 January 1783 that the committee of naval affairs of the States General would convene to make a report on the matter. The committee reported that they felt that an inquiry should be left to the competent admiralty courts of the three admiralties whose officers were involved in the matter: Amsterdam, Zeeland and Rotterdam (the two other admiralties, North Holland and Friesland, had no ships in the planned expedition) to decide on the question whether criminal charges should be preferred against any officers. But the States of Holland rejected this proposal, firstly because it seemed to cast doubt on the question whether anyone could be blameworthy (a question the States had already answered to their own satisfaction), and because the three admiralties mentioned could already themselves be at fault in the matter, and would therefore have a clear conflict of interest. The States therefore wanted the States General to appoint a commission of inquiry that should report as soon as possible, and if necessary, if it found certain people to be culpable, to refer those to a criminal prosecution before the competent courts.

It took a while to convince the other provinces, but eventually the committee of naval affairs itself started an inquiry by asking the Admiralty Colleges of the three Admiralties to justify their behavior. It was no surprise that they managed to clear their reputations, so the Committee repeated its proposal to leave the inquest to the Admiralty courts, which five provinces accepted, but Holland and Groningen opposed. It illustrates the true power relations within the States General that Holland eventually prevailed and that on 23 December 1783 (so almost a year after de Gijselaar had made his initial demand) a resolution was passed to form a special commission of the States General to hold the inquest, as Holland had always wanted. The composition of the commission was two members for Holland, and one for each of the other provinces.

The members appointed were the pensionaries of Haarlem, Adriaan van Zeebergh, and Amsterdam, Engelbert François van Berckel for Holland (both leaders of the Patriot faction); W.A. van Beveren for Zeeland; E. van Haften tot Ophemert for Gelderland; W.E. de Perponcher de Sedlnitsky for Utrecht; R.L. van Andringa de Kempenaer for Friesland; L.G. Rouse for Overijssel; and J.H. Siccama for Groningen. The commission started its work on 30 March 1784. Its inquest lasted no less than 15 months, and when it reported on 24 June 1785 its report comprised three volumes. (Note: Cf. the text of the report, included in Sources as Rapport etc.; Cf. also the article in De Post van den Neder-Rhijn, included in the Sources.) All officers were questioned either personally, or in writing (Rear-Admiral Jan Hendrik van Kinsbergen, who was cruising in the Mediterranean at this time). Especially pensionary van Zeebergh had been active in the, often sharp, interrogatories. Even the stadtholder was interviewed. The commission was very critical about the conduct of the admirals Hartsinck and van Bylandt, especially the latter, who, in the words of the report, "had used all kinds of frivolous and artificial excuses to justify himself".

The commission came to the following conclusions:

1. The ships had indeed not been well-provisioned;
2. This was partly due to negligence of the Admiralty of Amsterdam, and partly to that of the captains concerned; (Note: The commission in this context also was critical of the defects in the organisation of the navy. It pointed out that the way individual captains were responsible for provisioning ships for their own account often worked to the detriment of the public finances; that the land provinces were often in arrears with their contributions to the maintenance of the fleet, which also was detrimental to proper provisioning; that the naval base of the Texel (present-day Den Helder) lacked the proper facilities on land; that naval departments often worked at cross-purposes; that officers often thought that the final authority on judging the advisability of orders from the political authorities should lie with them, so that they could ignore them, if they thought that best; and finally that the system of reporting on logistics often left the higher command in the dark as to the true state of preparedness of the fleet; Cf. de Jonge, pp.631-632.)
3. The degree of lack of readiness, however, had not risen to the level that it justified the refusal to let the flotilla depart, and therefore this excuse was deemed a subterfuge;
4. The true reasons for disobeying the direct orders were in the view of the commission that the officers involved had greatly exaggerated the difficulties in their own minds, while not doing enough to overcome those difficulties, and had overestimated their freedom to interpret the contingencies expressed in those orders;
5. The facts were so serious that the States General should take appropriate measures.

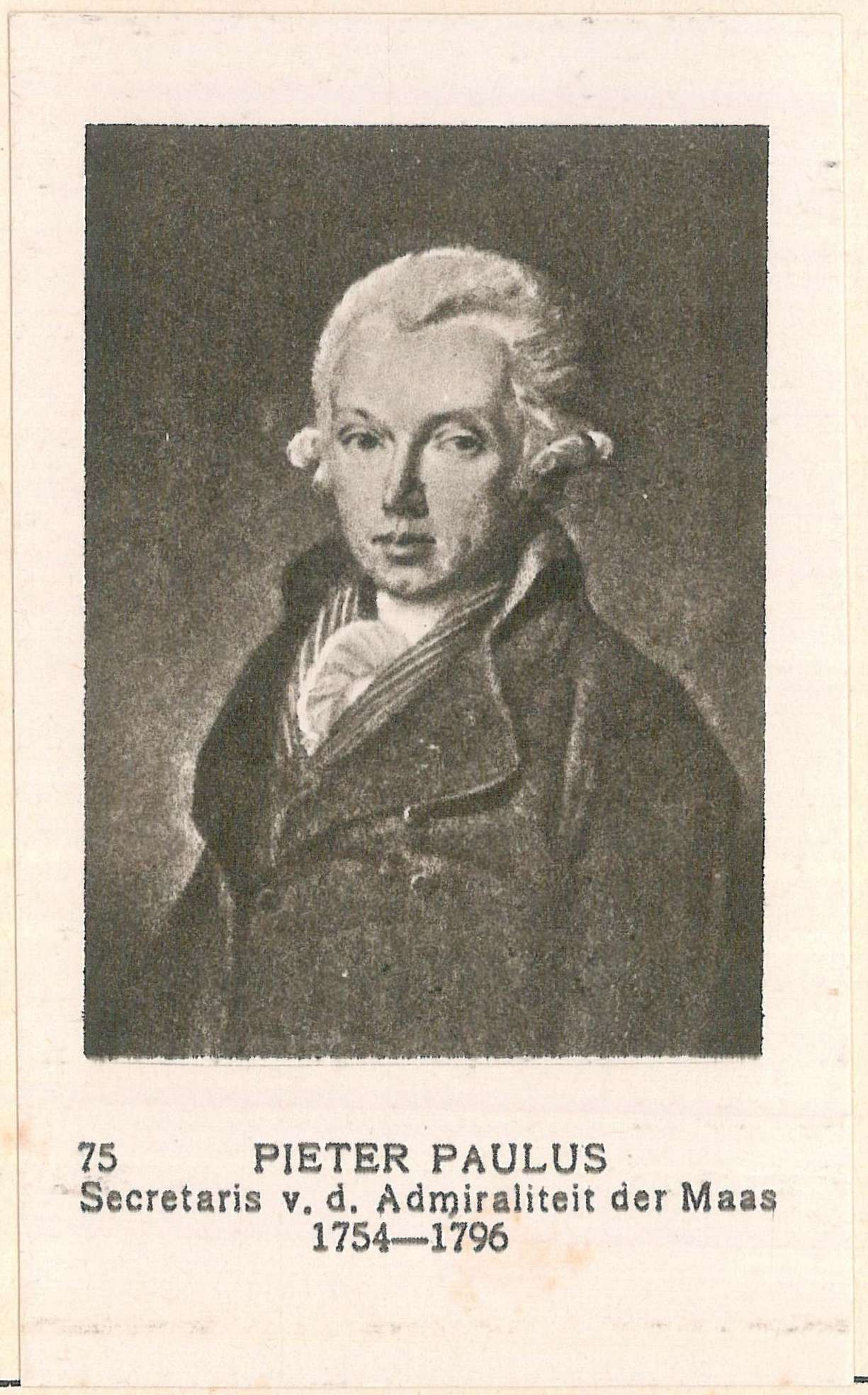
Pieter Paulus, the fiscaal who led the prosecution in the admiralty court

It should be remembered that in the Summer of 1785 the political situation in The Hague was slowly coming to the boil; the stadtholder would leave the city for his Het Loo Palace in September, not to return to the city before the Patriot party was suppressed by foreign intervention two years later. It should therefore cause no surprise that at first nothing happened with the report, also because the commission had made no recommendations the States General could directly act upon. So only in November 1785 there was movement in the sense that the two Holland members of the commission, the pensionaries Zeebergh and van Berckel moved in the States of Holland that the officers whose conduct had been criticized by the commission should be brought before the proper Admiralty courts to be tried. However, as this would mean that three courts would be competent for three different groups of defendants this would possibly lead to different treatments in like cases, which was to be avoided in the cause of justice. They therefore proposed that a special court would be formed from members of the Admiralty courts, and that only one of the Admiralty fiscals would be charged with conducting the prosecution before this special court (they nominated the new fiscal of the Admiralty of Rotterdam, Pieter Paulus for this task). Despite the opposition of Zeeland and Gelderland the States General accepted this proposal on 24 July 1786. A court of twelve delegated judges was instituted (three members of each of four Admiralty courts; the Amsterdam court was excluded because of conflicts of interest) and they convened on 16 November 1786. (Note: It should be remembered that by this time Holland had dismissed the stadtholder from his office of Admiral-General of the Holland fleet, after the occupation by States Army troops of the cities of Hattem and Elburg, and the suppression of the Patriot city governments there.)

But still the trial could not start, because Gelderland now invoked the Jus de non evocando, a basic civil right under the constitution of the Republic, on behalf of admiral van Bylandt, who was a member of the Gelderland ridderschap (College of Nobles) as gefürsteter Graf of Bylandt-Halt. Bringing him before a special court against his will was a clear breach of that right. So the States of Gelderland for good measure forbade him to appear before the court. As he would have been the main defendant this brought the whole procedure to a grinding halt for the others also. The case languished for the next three quarters of a year, until in September 1787 the stadtholder was restored in all his offices, and the Patriots were purged from theirs (including fiscal Pieter Paulus, who was fired in November 1787). The States of Gelderland promoted the repeal of the resolution to institute the special court on 12 November 1787. The stadtholder quietly "forgot" about the case, and any criminal proceedings were forever shelved.

== Sources ==
- van Bylandt, Lodewijk (1783). "Memorie van Lodewyk, grave van Byland, vice-admiraal ten dienste deezer landen, enz: Behelzende een voordracht van deszelfs gehouden conduites omtrent de geordonneerde expeditie na Brest, en een betoog der motiven van dezelve". Google Books (in Dutch).
- Colenbrander, H.T. (1897). "De Patriottentijd. Deel 1: 1776-1784". Digitale Bibliotheek voor de Nederlandse Letteren (in Dutch).
- Jonge, J.C. de, and J.K.J. de Jonge (1861). "Geschiedenis van het Nederlandsche Zeewezen. Deel 4". Google Books (in Dutch).
- "Extract uit het rapport der Heeren gecomitteerden tot het onderzoek wegens de mislukte expeditie naar Brest, ingeleverd in de Vergadering van H.H.M.H. Staaten Generaal der vereenigde Nederlanden, 24 Junij 1785, in: De post van den Neder-Rhijn, Volume 7". Google Books (in Dutch). 1785. p. 424-426.
- Anonymous (1783). "De XXX. Artikelen Nevens Hunne Aanhangsels, Of Nieuwe Bedenkingen, Voorgedraagen Aan den Heere Admiraal-Generaal Der Zeven Vereenighde Provincien, Over De Mislukking Der Expeditie Naar Brest". Google Books (in Dutch).
- Anonymous (1785). "Rapport van de heeren [...] gecommitteerd, tot het onderzoek [...] van non-executie van hun hoog mog. ordres, tot het verzenden van tien scheepen naar Brest". Google Books (in Dutch).
