= Antoine Marie Cerisier =

French journalist and politician (1749–1828)

Antoine Marie Cerisier (19 November 1749, in Châtillon-lès-Dombes – 1 July 1828, in Châtillon-lès-Dombes) was a French journalist, politician and historian, who played a role in the Patriot Revolution in the Dutch Republic in 1785–1787, after first having supported the cause of the American Revolution in that country in collaboration with American ambassador John Adams. Later he also played a role in the early years of the French Revolution as a collaborator of Mirabeau. In that capacity he published an extract of the Dutch Leiden Draft, a manifesto that may have influenced the French Declaration of the Rights of Man and of the Citizen.

== Personal life ==
Cerisier was born the son of grocer Jean Baptiste Cerisier and Marie Anne Chanrion. He was baptised together with his twin brother Jean Sébastien as "Marie Antoine" on 21 November, but later reversed the order of his Christian names. His uncle J. Cerisier, who taught Rhetoric at the Collège des Grassins in Paris, had him educated in that city. Cerisier married Victoire de Vaulpré with whom he had at least nine children.

== Career ==
Cerisier came to the Netherlands around 1775, where he became secretary to the French legation to the Dutch Republic at The Hague. He had little to do in that function and as a hobby started studying Dutch history. He wrote a total of ten volumes on that subject, mostly from the perspective of the so-called "States party" (the opponents of the Dutch stadtholders) that were published between 1777 and 1784. The French legation at the time was heavily engaged in attempts to influence Dutch public opinion in favor of France and its American allies in the American Revolutionary War. When the Republic became embroiled in the Fourth Anglo-Dutch War as an ally of the French and Americans Cerisier (by then no longer a diplomat) became friendly with the new American ambassador, John Adams (apparently from their correspondence even before Adams came to the Netherlands) and the two engaged in disseminating pamphlets in favor of the American cause. (Note: See for the correspondence between Cerisier and John Adams the Founders Online archive)

Cerisier became a journalist who contributed to several periodicals. Together with A. Crajenschot he edited le Politique hollandais between 1781 and 1784 Cerisier became around 1780 an editor of the Gazette de Leyde a French-language Dutch newspaper, published in Leiden by Jean Luzac at the time. This was a newspaper that had many contributors who favored the side of the anti-Orangist Patriot party, the opponents of stadtholder William V. like Wybo Fijnje and Gerrit Paape. Fijnje was one of the editors of the so-called Leiden Draft, a Patriot manifesto that appeared in 1785, and Cerisier may have had some input in its composition, though it is an exaggeration that he actually wrote the entire document. (Note: See for the claim and the controversy Jeremy Popkin, Dutch Patriots, French Journalists and Declaration of Rights: the leidse ontwerp of 1785 and its Diffusion in France, The Historical Journal, vol. 38 (1995): pp. 553-65; but Popkin later acknowledged that Cerisiers role was less important in the writing of the Leiden Draft; Cf. Jeremy D. Popkin, Antoine-Marie Cerisier; le Leidse Ontwerp et le Grondwettige Herstelling un debat encore ouvert in: De Achttiende Eeuw, vol. 29, no. 1 (1997), pp. 17-34. See also Jourdan, A., The "Alien Origins" of the French Revolution: American, Scottish, Genevan, and Dutch Influences, in: J. of the Western Society for French History, vol. 35 (2007, and Postma, J., Het Leids ontwerp. Mythen en Feiten, in: Openbaar Bestuur, vol. 18, no. 11 (November 2008), pp. 38–40) It is true, however, that he published a French extract of the Leiden Draft in 1788, after he had returned to France when the Patriot Revolution had been suppressed by Anglo-Prussian military intervention in the Fall of 1787, and many Patriots fled to France. This extract was entitled Extrait du plan général de réforme concerté par les patriotes hollandois and appeared in the periodical Analyse des papiers anglais. In this period Cerisier closely collaborated with the trailblazer of the French Revolution, Honoré de Mirabeau, and Jeremy Popkin and others have speculated on the basis of archival research that this co-writer of the Déclaration des droits de l'homme et du citoyen was influenced by this extract of the Dutch document.

Cersisier was elected a representative for the Third Estate to the Estates General of 1789 for Bourg-en-Bresse, but he did not take his seat. Instead he became an editor for the Gazette universelle, a royalist newspaper which he founded together with Joseph François Michaud and Pascal Boyer in 1789. This journal was financially very successful, but it was suppressed in 1792 when it published the fact that the Jacobin Jean Louis Carra had formerly been sentenced to the galleys. The periodical was then taken over by the government on 15 August 1792 and renamed Nouvelles politiques, nationales et étrangères. Cerisier had to flee for his life to the Beaujolais where he was arrested and imprisoned under the Reign of Terror. He was released on 9 January 1794 (so before the fall of Maximilien Robespierre on 9 Thermidor).

Apparently, after this experience he decided to leave journalism and become a farmer. Not without success, because in 1807 (when his daughter Marie Sebastienne married) he appears to have been a successful businessman worth 200,000 francs. He became deputy mayor of the municipality of Lancié in 1800. In 1812 he became mayor, which he remained until after the Hundred Days. He resigned in 1816, but remained a member of the municipal council until 26 March 1827. He died in his native town Châtillon-lès-Dombes on 1 July 1828.

== Works ==
- Tableau de l'histoire générale des Provinces Unies. Utrecht, 1777-1784. 10 vol.
- La Pierre de touche des écrits et des affaires politiques, s.l., 1779
- Le Destin de l'Amérique ou Dialogues pittoresques dans lesquels on développe la cause des événements actuels, la politique et les intérêts des puissances de l'Europe [...], traduit fidèlement de l'anglais, «Londres», 1780
- Le Politique Hollandais, 1780-1785. 4 vol.
- Histoire de la fondation des colonies des anciennes républiques, adaptée à la dispute présente de la Grande Bretagne avec ses colonies Américaines. Utrecht, 1788
- Remarques sur les erreurs de l'Histoire Philosophique et Politique de Raynal par rapport aux affaires de l'Amérique Septentrionale, traduit de l'Anglais de Thomas Payne. Amsterdam, 1785.
- Régénération de la France par les Etats Généraux, 1788 (analysé dans Le Duc dans les Curiosités historiques de l'Ain, t. II, p. 819)
- Extrait du plan général de réforme concerté par les patriotes hollandois, in Analyse des papiers anglais no. 75 (15–18 Aug. 1788)

== Sources ==
- Aa, A.J. van der, "Antoine Marie Cerisier", in: Biographisch woordenboek der Nederlanden. Deel 3(1858), pp. 295–297 (in Dutch)
- Favre, R., "Antoine Cerisier (1749-1828)", in: Dictonnaire des journalistes (1600-1789), p. 157 (in French)
- Popkin, J.D., "Dutch patriots, French journalists, and declarations of rights: the Leidse Ontwerp of 1785 and its diffusion in France", in: The Historical Journal, Volume 38, Issue 3 September 1995, pp. 553–565
