= Jacob Elias la Fargue =

Dutch painter

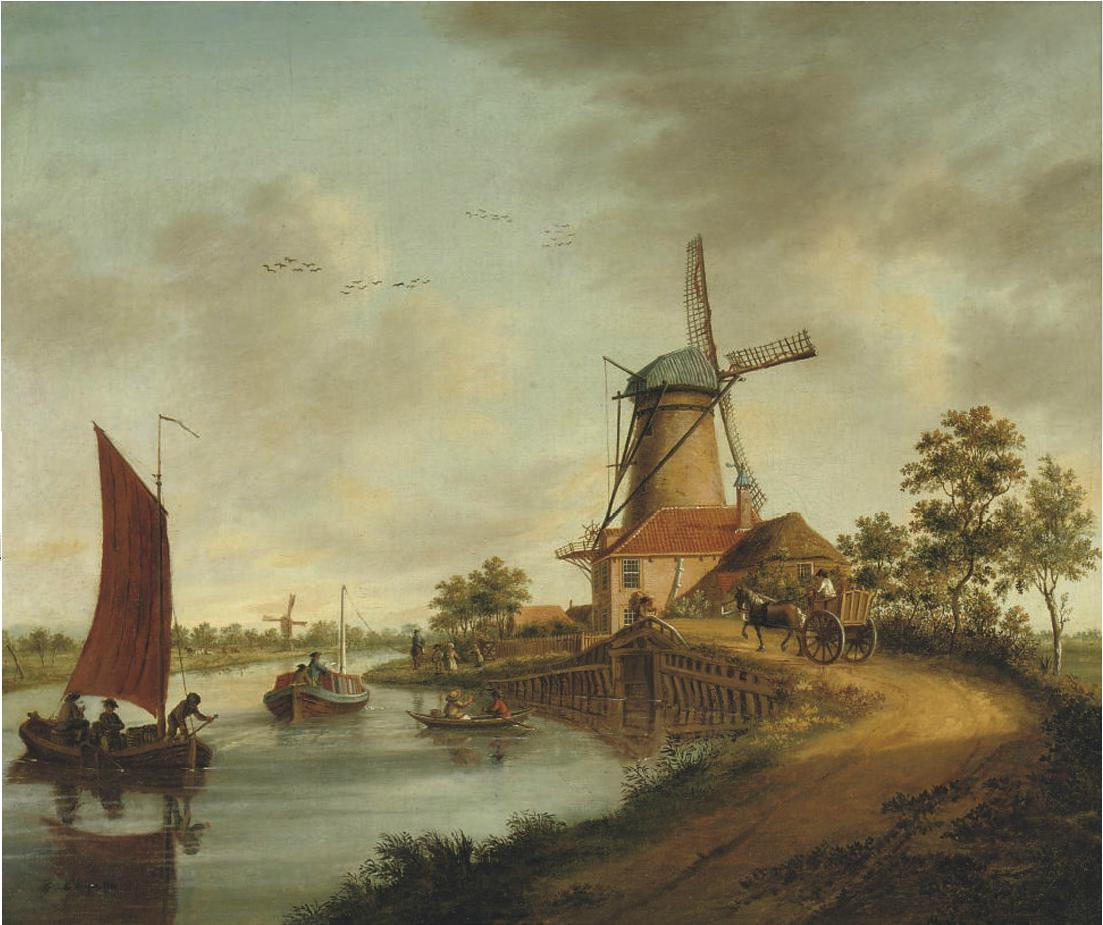
View of a trekschuit and windmill along the Vliet, 1756

Jacob Elias la Fargue (1735–1778) was an 18th-century painter from the Dutch Republic.

== Biography ==
He was born in Voorburg to Jan Thomas la Fargue and was the younger brother of Paulus Constantijn la Fargue. His other siblings Maria Margaretha, Karel and Isaac Lodewijk also became painters. He became a member of the Confrerie Pictura in The Hague in 1761 and lived and worked there until he died.
