= Joan Cornelis van der Hoop =

Netherlands lawyer and government member

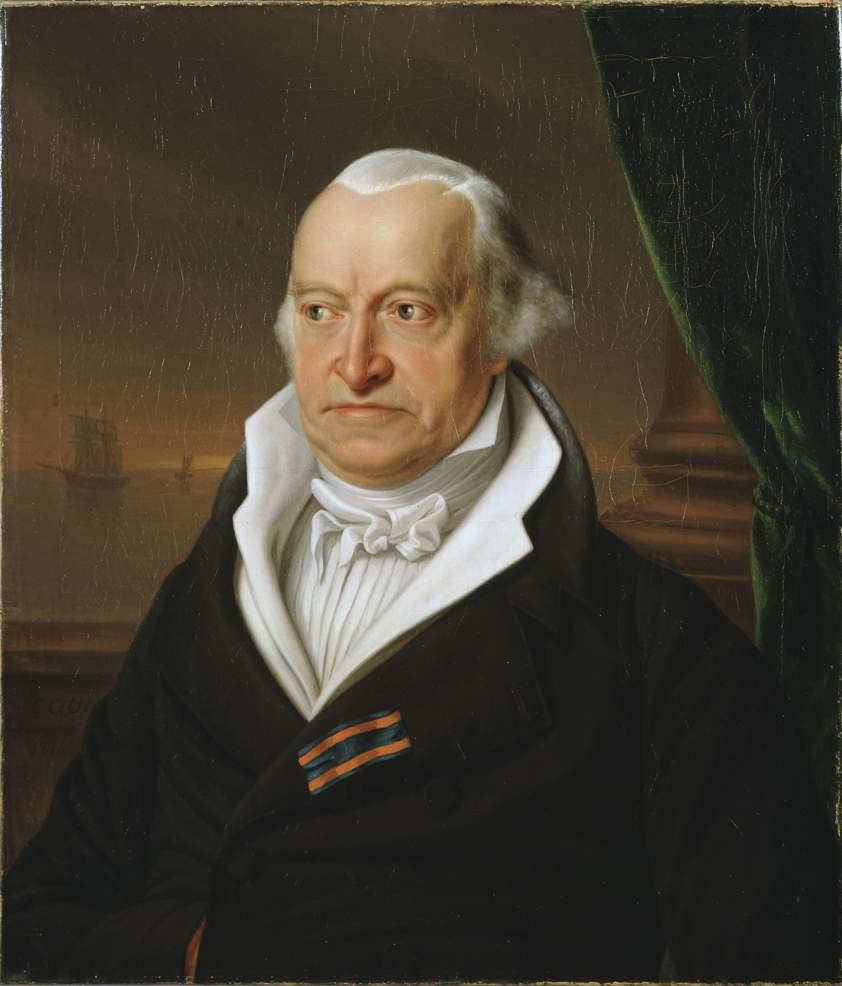
Joan Cornelis van der Hoop in 1816 by Cornelis Cels.

Mr. Joan Cornelis van der Hoop (18 May 1742, in The Hague – 13 March 1825, in The Hague) was a Dutch lawyer, public prosecutor and minister and, at the time of the Dutch Republic, fulfilled important positions under king William I and - with the exception of the Batavian-French era - left his mark on the Dutch navy. A street is named after him in Amsterdam.

== Life ==
Cornelis van der Hoop was the youngest son of Adriaan van der Hoop, secretary of the Council of State. After his study in Leiden, he became a lawyer and quickly made his name. He became secretary of the Association of Surinam in Amsterdam, having been helped to that position by mayor Joachim Rendorp. In 1781, he became public prosecutor for the Admiralty of Amsterdam, during the Fourth Anglo-Dutch War. Van der Hoop worked from home at the Prinsenhof. In the summer of 1782 a plan arose to have a Dutch squadron sail round Brest, together with a French fleet, and then sail against England, but this turned into a debacle. After the debacle better cooperation was finally put in place between the fleets. Van der Hoop consulted with princess Wilhelmina of Prussia on a number of attempts to capture him, without success. Also they later maintained contact and a correspondence. One Englishman called "Mr. Van der Hoop... the important gentleman in the state."

In 1785, he came into conflict with the Admiralties administration. In August 1787 Van der Hoop loaned two ships from the defense commission of Amsterdam for patrols on the Zuider Zee. The ambitious Pieter Paulus - Joan's colleague in Rotterdam and both men quarrelled over reforms within the navy, after an attempt was made to bring the five admiralties together and to centralize appointments. After 1787, Van der Hoop left, his political ambitions disappointed by the passive attitude of the stadholder, and withdrew from public life.

From February 1795, he and Van Kinsbergen were only in office for months and then became private citizens again. In the following years, Van der Hoop put everything into his efforts to get back his financial claim on the Admiralty. Van der Hoop gardened and refused to hold a public position, handing over the keys of the city to William I on 2 December 1813. A few days later he was chairman of the temporary administration of Amsterdam and shortly after commissioner-general (minister) of Navy. Under his care appeared one set of regulations after another. Joan hardly ever travelled, and never much further than Den Helder and Vlissingen.

Cornelis was the father of Adriaan van der Hoop, the banker and art collector who donated most of his collection to the city of Amsterdam, which created the Rijksmuseum to house it.

== Honours ==
- Knight Grand Cross in the Order of the Netherlands Lion.
- Knight in the Legion of Honour.

== See also ==
- Cornelis van der Hoop Gijsbertsz.

== Sources ==
- Habermehl, N.D.B. (2000) Joan Cornelis van der Hoop (1742—1825). Marinebestuurder voor stadhouder Willem V en koning Willem I.
- Vles, E.J. (2004) Pieter Paulus (1753—1796) Patriot en Staatsman, p. 49, 55, 66, 72
