= Paulus Constantijn la Fargue =

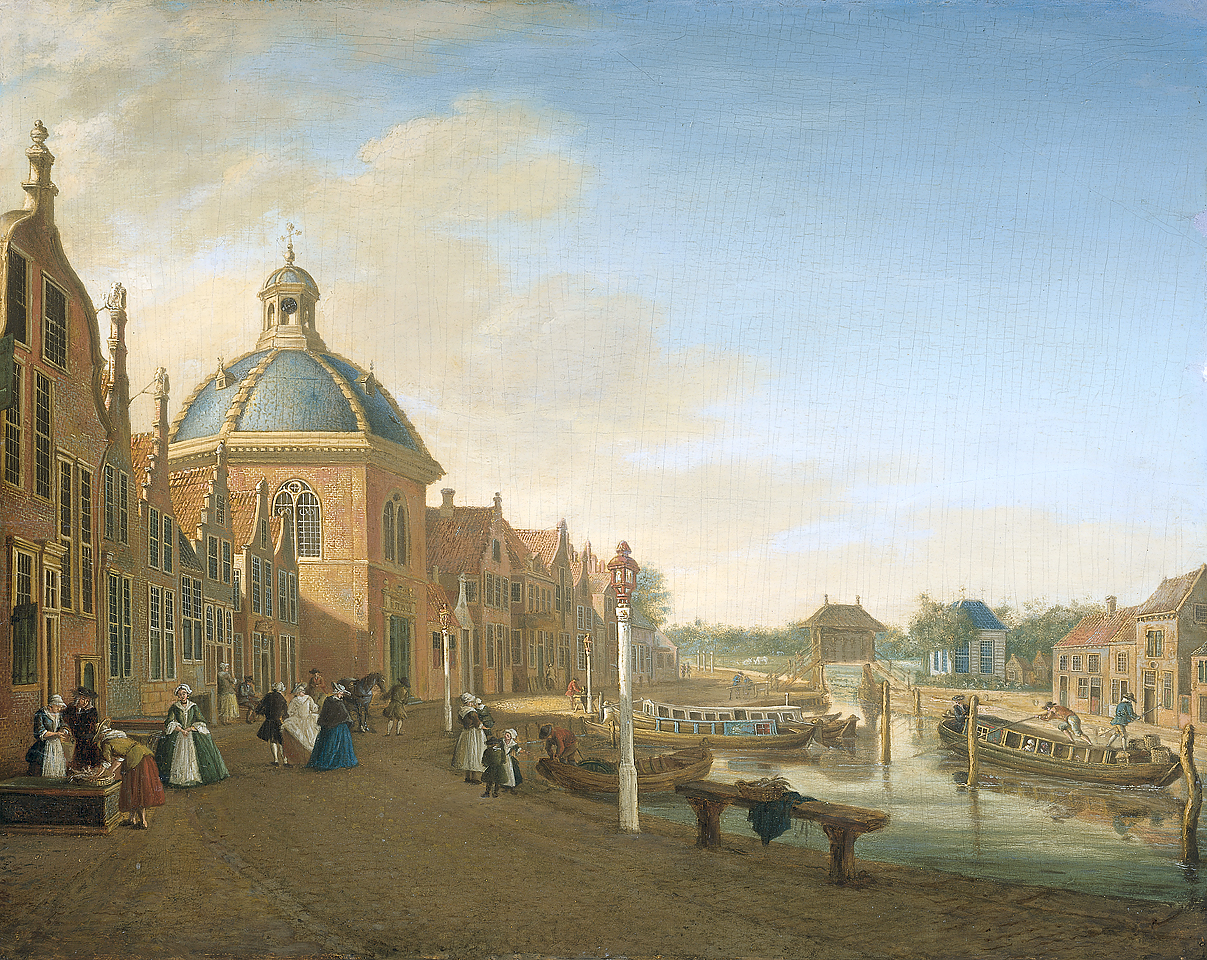
The barge-canal between The Hague and Leiden at Leidschendam by Paulus Constantijn la Fargue, Rijksmuseum Twenthe, 1756

Paulus Constantijn la Fargue, also Constantine Paul Lafargue, (The Hague, 5 January 1729 - 10 June 1782) was a Dutch painter, etcher and draftsman.

La Fargue was born into an artistic family. His father Jean Thomas was a notary, translator and pamphleteer. His siblings Isaac Lodewijk (1726 - 1805), Jacob Elias (1735 - c.1778) Karel (1738 - 1793), and Maria Margaretha (1743 - 1813), were all painters. In 1761 he and his brother Jacob joined The Hague Painters Society known as the Confrerie Pictura. In 1768 he is recorded as a member of the Royal Academy of Art, The Hague.

Paul Constantine la Fargue was the most talented and the most productive member of the La Fargue family of artists from The Hague. Probably entirely self taught, he applied himself at first to the making of kamerbehangsels (painted wall hangings), some of them commissioned by The Hague art dealer Gerard Hoet. Soon however, he specialised in painting, drawing and etching townscapes and landscapes with topographical elements. The sketches he made on site formed the source material on which he and his younger brothers Jacob Elias and Karel based their more elaborate paintings and drawings, sometimes after an interim of more than ten years. La Fargue's topographical work from the 1760s brought Rotterdam into the picture as well as The Hague. During the 1770s views in and around Delft, Leiden, Haarlem, and Amsterdam were added. His paintings which were relatively small in format and clearly influenced by seventeenth-century painters such as Jan van der Heyden are somewhat static, though his more spontaneous drawings show greater originality. La Fargue's depictions are fairly reliable in a topographical sense, lively in colour and filled with charming little figures that create variety. In addition to townscapes, he is known to have represented actual events, portraits and genre scenes. He also illustrated several almanacs and books. Even though this artist could count such people as the French and English ambassadors among his patrons at the beginning of his career, his life was not easy, and he, and his brothers and sister were continually troubled by financial problems. La Fargue who belongs to the group of better topographical artists of the second half of the eighteenth century, nevertheless derives his significance chiefly from the documentary value of his work.

== Examples of his work ==
The Municipal Archives of The Hague hold 160 examples of his work by far the largest collection(Link below).

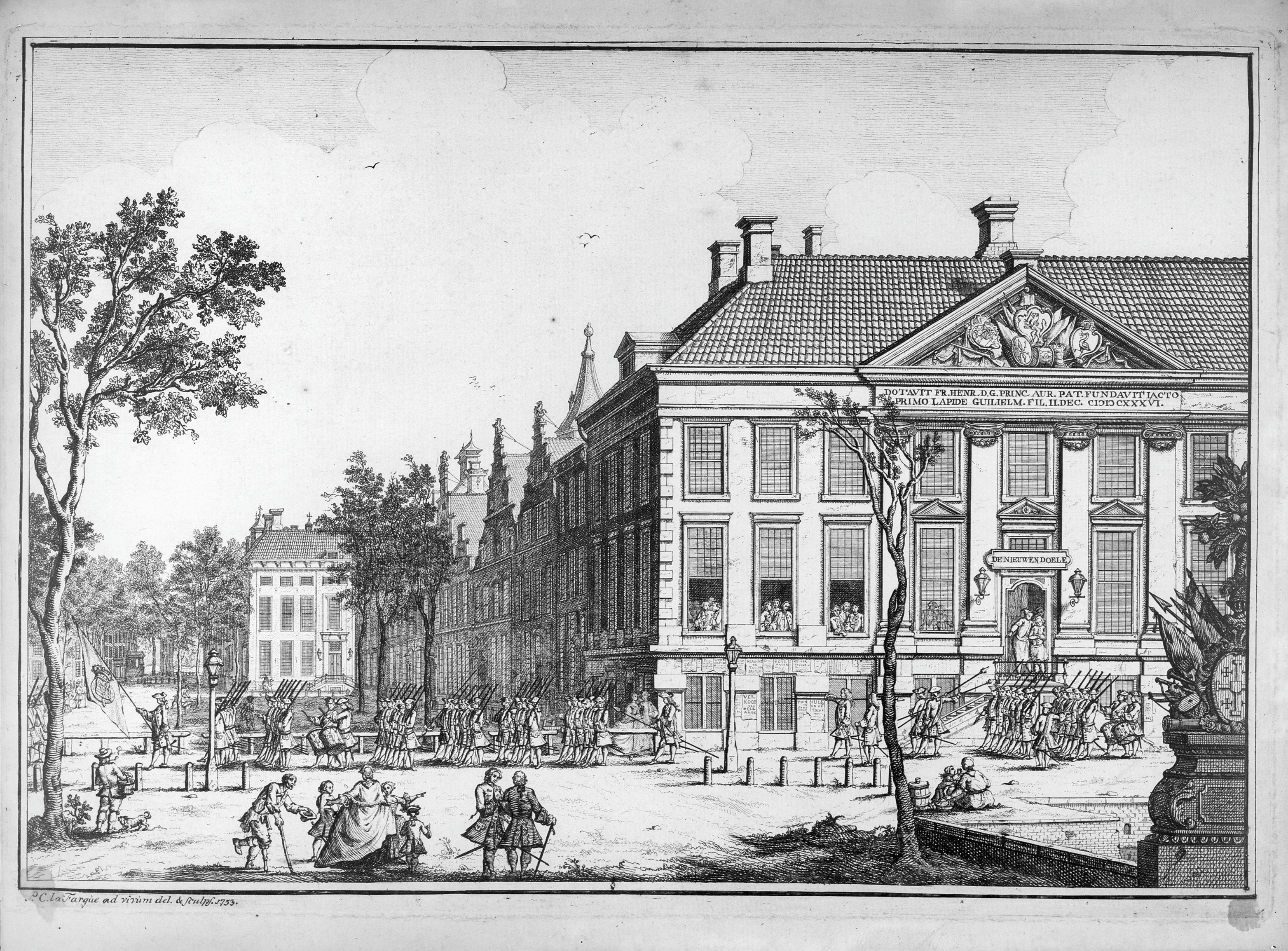
Engraving The Hague Circa 1753.

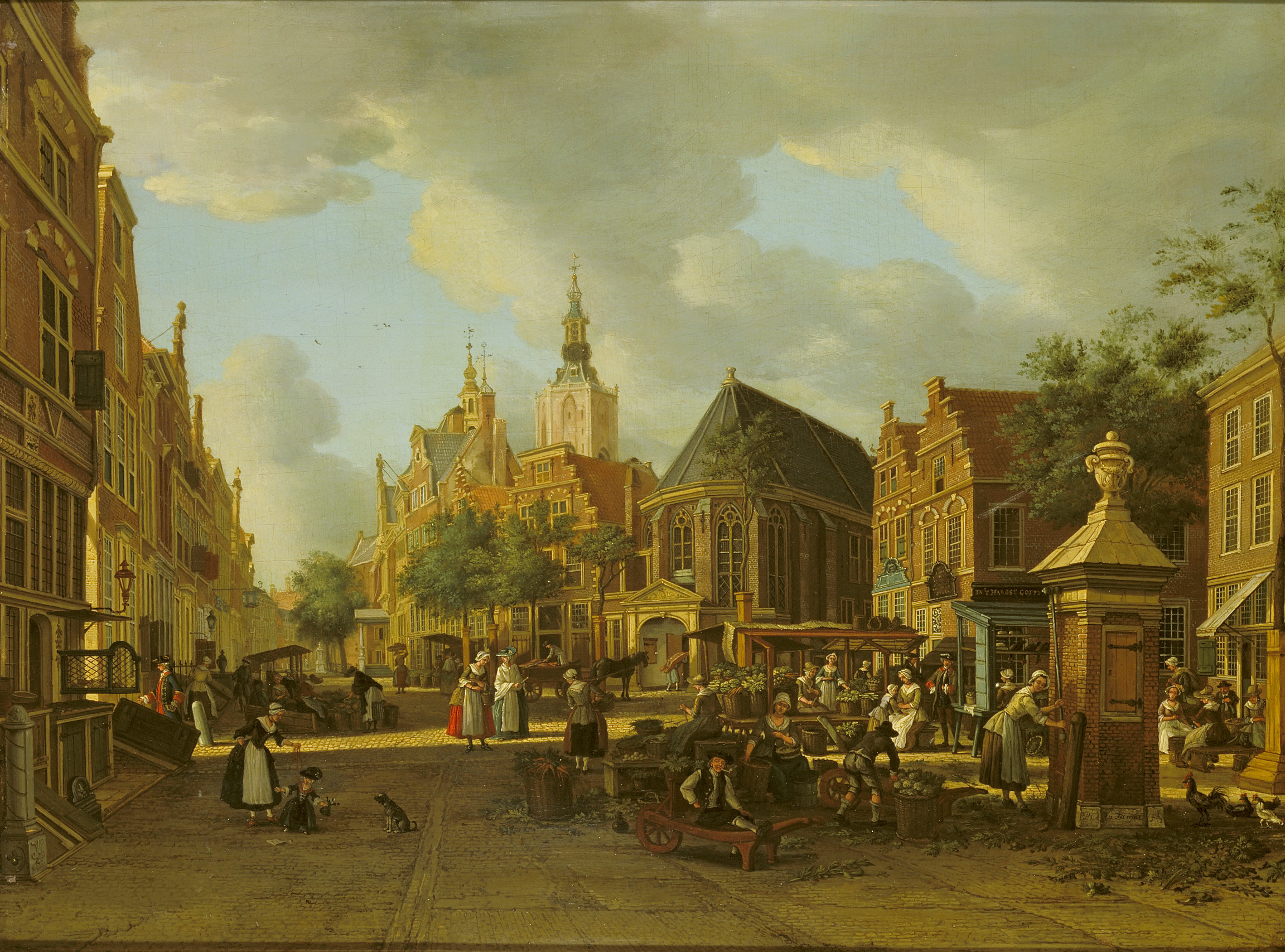
"The Groen (Green) Market", The Hague as seen towards the western end. circa 1765

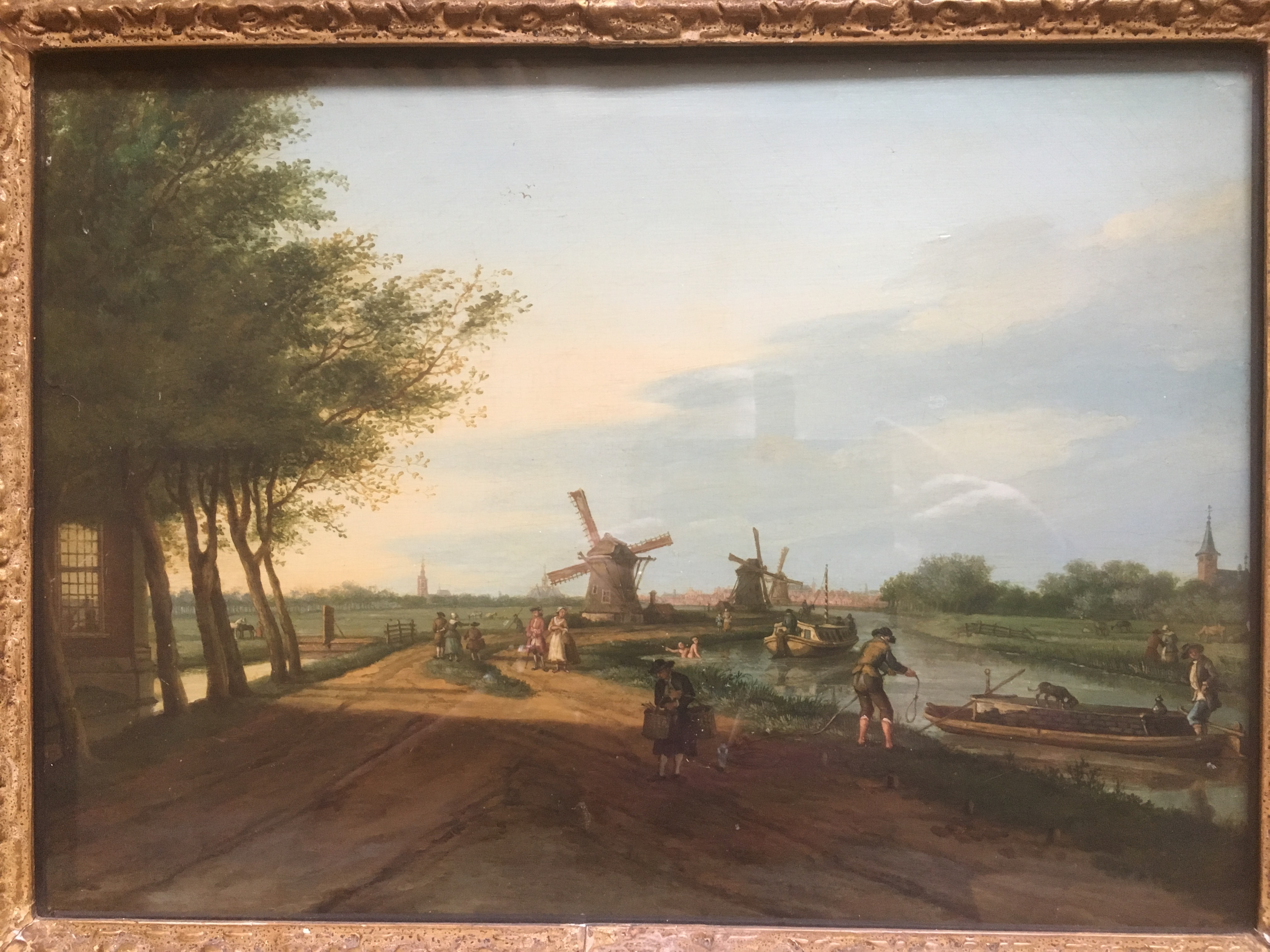
A view of The Hague from Rijswijk circa 1765.

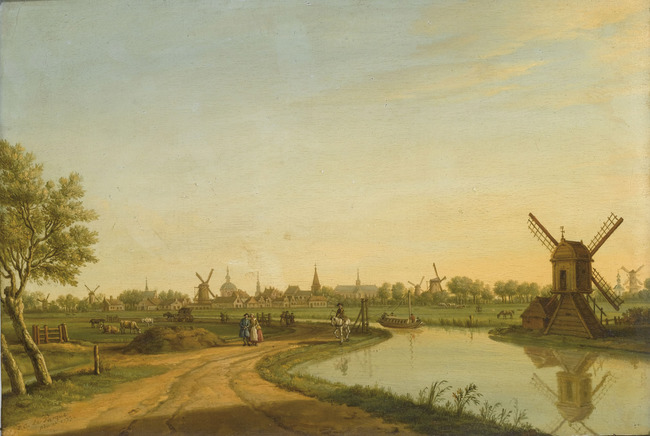
A view of Lieden dated 1773, Image from The Netherlands Institute of Art History or RKD.

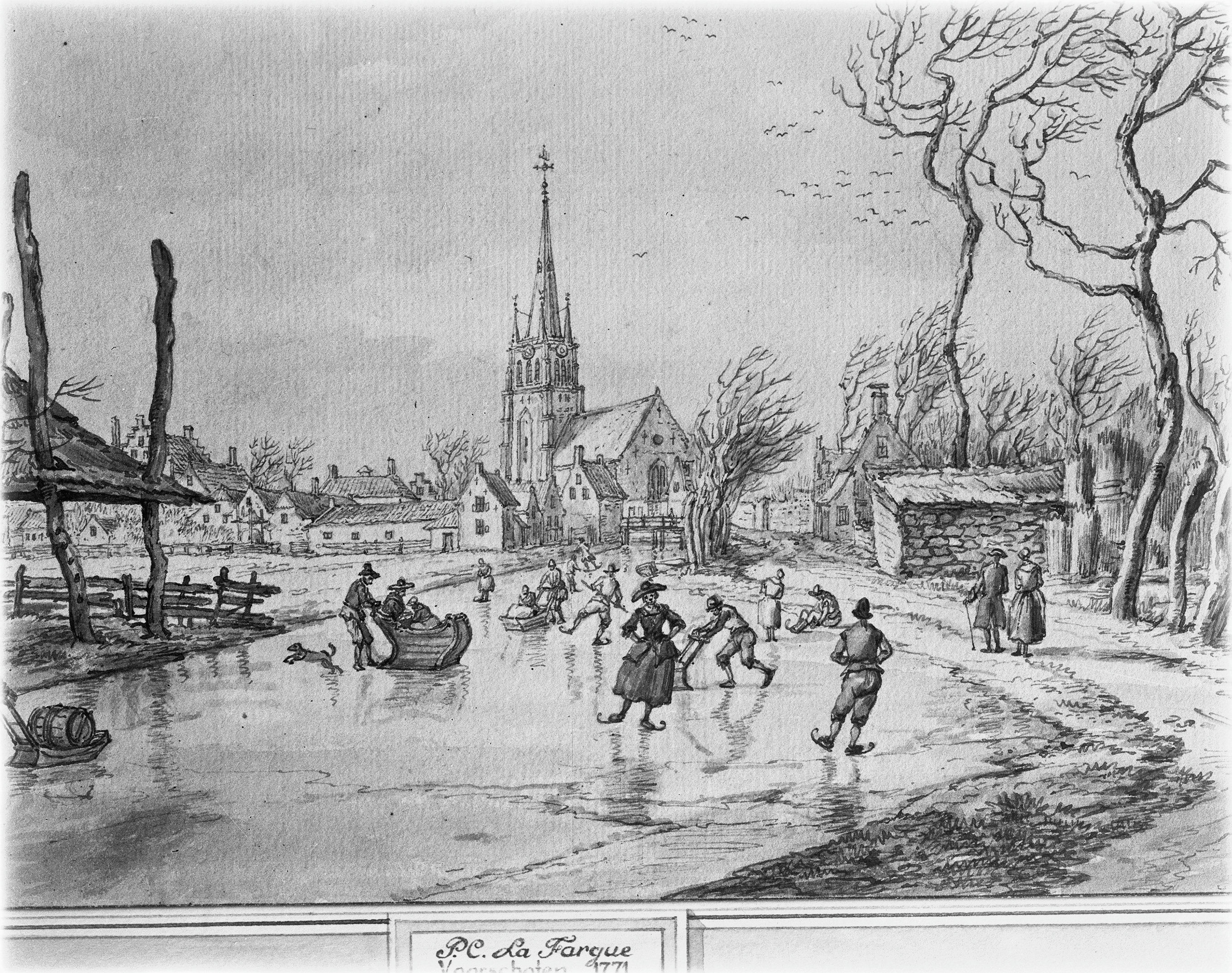
Drawing "Ice skating" at Voorschoten SW of Leiden Circa 1782.

Cityscape The Hague, a view of the Binnenhof

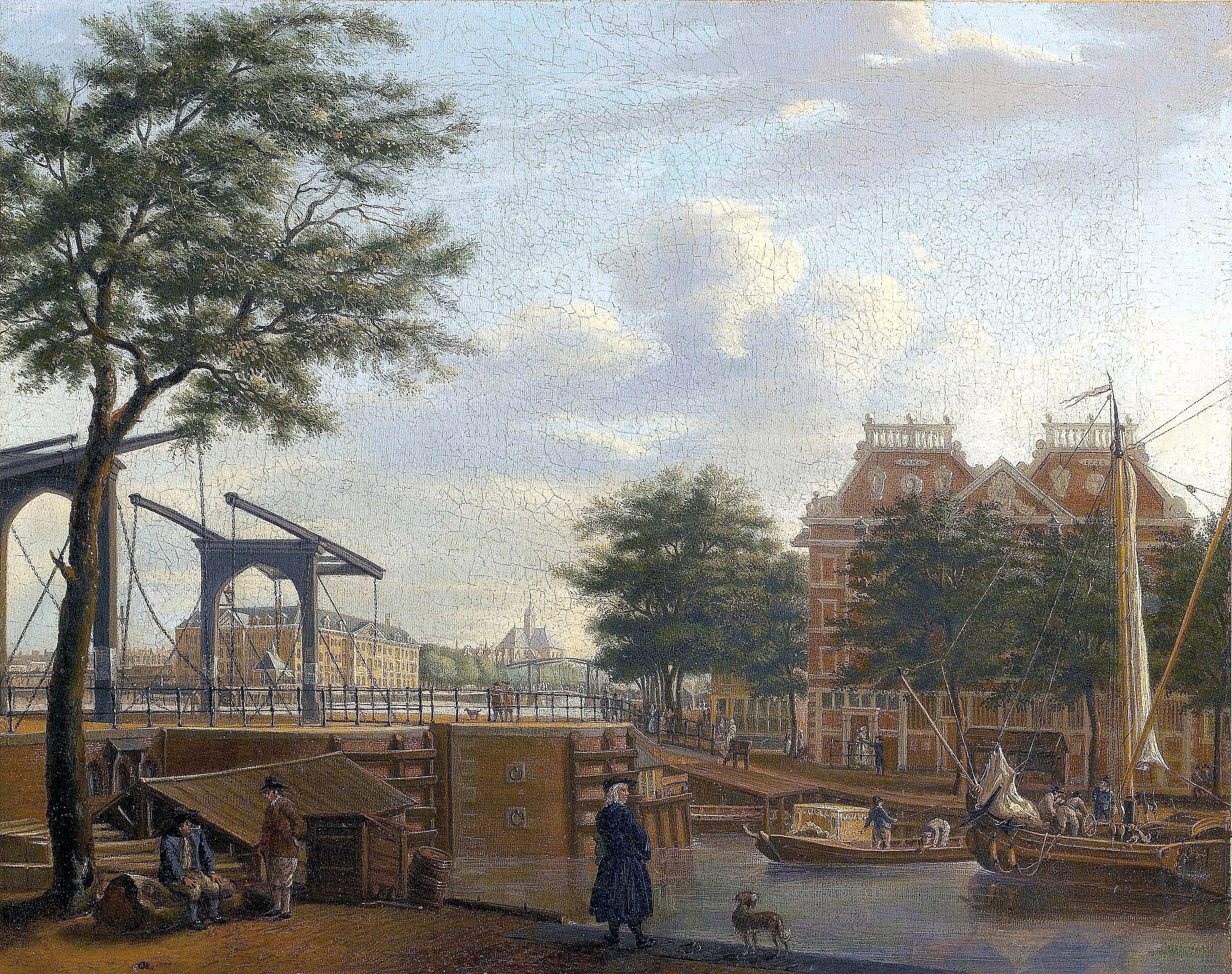
View of Amsterdam with the Scheepvaartmuseum

== Note ==
"With over 35 years of studying the La Fargue family, Charles Dumas from The Hague is the acknowledged expert on the artist. Dumas is compiling an illustrated 'catalogue raisonne’ on the La Fargue family and intends to publish it within a few years."
