= Pieter Paulus =

Dutch jurist and politician

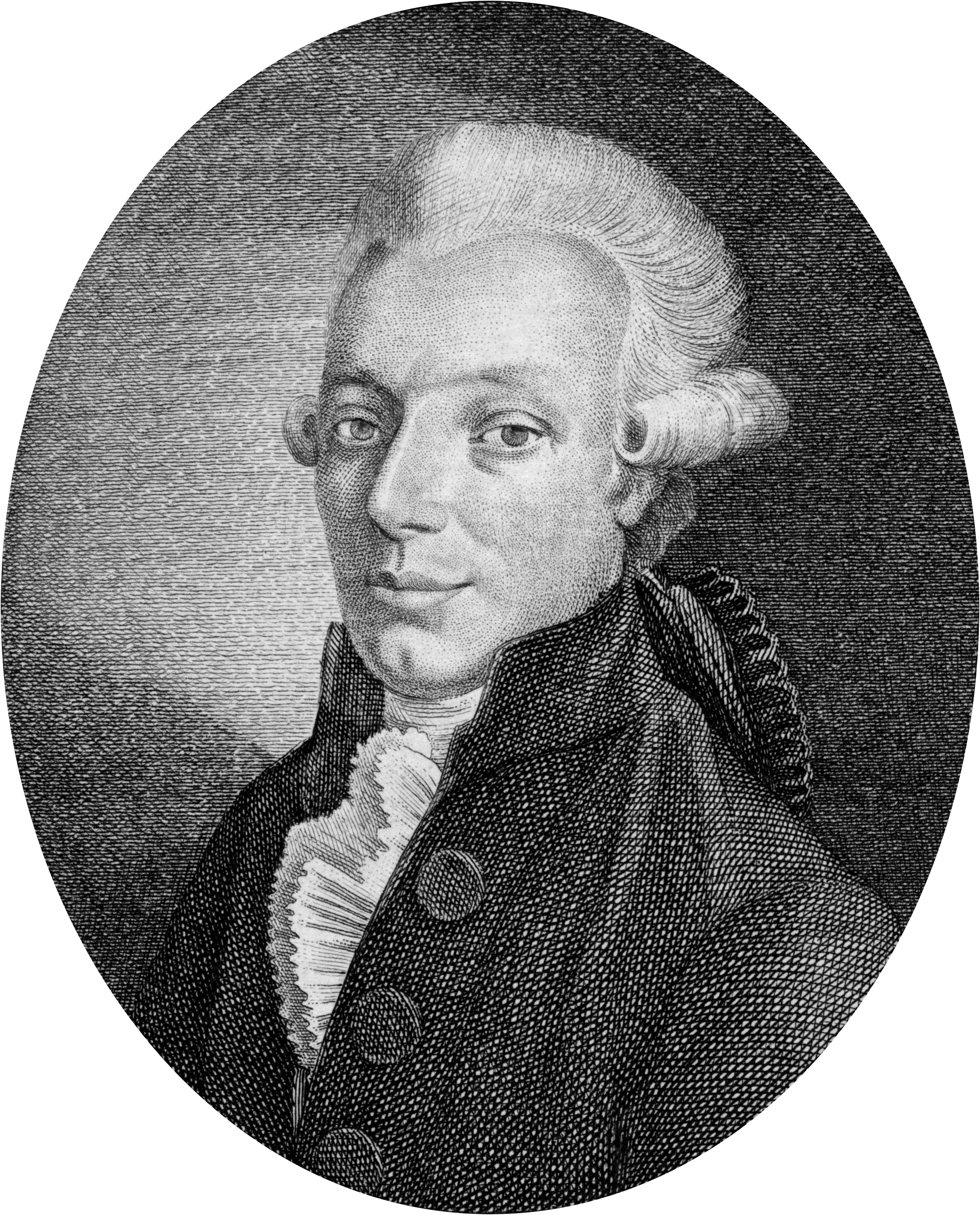
Portrait of Pieter Paulus by Reinier Vinkeles

Pieter Paulus (9 April 1753 – 17 March 1796) was a Dutch jurist, fiscal (prosecutor) of the Admiralty of the Maze and politician. He was one of the ideologues of the Dutch Patriot movement and is considered by many Dutch as the founder of their democracy and political unity. (Note: Prof. J.Th.J. van den Berg, a political scientist at Maastricht University praised Pieter Paulus in his valedictory lecture, entitled De dominee en 'de tweede apostel Paulus' (27 September 2012), as the founder of Dutch parliamentary democracy and for that reason asked for a hall in the Dutch parliament building in The Hague to be named after him, a proposal that was echoed on the opinion pages of Dutch newspapers at the time. Cf. Van den Berg, p. 17; Cf. Hans Goslinga, Eer Pieter Paulus met een eigen zaal in de Tweede Kamer, in Trouw, 16 October 2012 (Honor Pieter Paulus with a dedicated hall in the Tweede Kamer) (in Dutch))

== Life ==
Paulus was born in Axel, Zeelandic Flanders, the son of Josias Paulus and Maria de Lege. His father was Axel's mill-builder, schepen and mayor. He came, perhaps, from a family of lapsed Huguenots. After an education in 's-Hertogenbosch, he received his training from the Vlissingen rector Van Cruysselenbergen, in whose house he lived. He became a student in Utrecht in 1770.

Paulus became known nationwide through his bestselling book on the stadholder system, in which he (just 20 years old) opposed both the stadholder system and the duke of Brunswijk. (Note: Though the title of the (originally anonymous; Paulus admitted his authorship only in 1775; Suringar, p. 21, note 2) work appeared to defend the stadtholderian system. But if one closely read his argument the positive remarks turned out to be "faint praise", and the negative criticisms of the practices of the Duke outweighed them; cf. Suringar, pp. 5-10) In 1774, he became a student at Leiden (Note: Up to that year he had been unofficially studying at Utrecht University, but he decided to transfer to Leiden University to write and defend his dissertation; cf. Suringar, p. 24-26) and he graduated on 12 December 1775, with his dissertation becoming a second publishing success. He established himself in 1776 as a lawyer at the Court of Holland in the Hague. In the following years he worked on his magnum opus: Verklaring der Unie van Utrecht (Elucidation of the Union of Utrecht) which became a standard work on the constitutional law of the Dutch Republic (Note: As often with the young Paulus, the work was not without controversy, as some accused him of plagiarism as he had not always attributed his quotations from the unpublished work of Grand Pensionary Simon van Slingelandt appropriately; cf. Suringar, pp. 29-43) which Paulus considered "the only Dutch constitution" (whereas others would argue that other treaties, like the Great Privilege, the Pacification of Ghent, the Twelve Years' Truce treaty and the Peace of Münster were also part of the corpus that together comprised that constitution). In 1780, he was involved in the controversy over the expansion of the fleet, defended by Admiral Jan Hendrik van Kinsbergen.

In 1781, he married the very rich Françoise Vockestaert and bought the country house "Pasgeld" near Delft.

He again became nationally known in 1783 through his apologia for the city of Alkmaar, one of the first cities (after Schoonhoven) to pass a resolution to limit the influence of the stadholder. Paulus became one of the leaders of the Patriot movement. In the early intrigues between the Stadtholder's Court, led by princess Wilhelmina of Prussia, and the fiscal of the Admiralty of Amsterdam Joan Cornelis van der Hoop to give her more influence to counteract the Duke of Brunswick, and to institute a secret Naval Council, Paulus was seen as a useful ally. On 13 April 1785, he was appointed public prosecutor (advocaat-fiscaal) for the Admiralty of the Maze, taking the initiative in its reorganisation, and being appointed as prosecutor in the Brest Affair. The Princess regarded him as the most sympathetic of her opponents (as she wrote to the Prussian ambassador), but his suggestion that the stadtholder should make an alliance with the democrats under the Patriots, she completely rejected. After the events in Hattem, (Note: The stadtholder, William V sent troops to occupy the city of Hattem that was a Patriot stronghold on 4 September 1787; cf. Vles, p.m 69ff.) Paulus refused to come to Het Loo, but probably was in friendly negotiations with the French ministry of Foreign Affairs.

Paulus was not banished in 1788, in the purge that followed the Prussian invasion of Holland, after being fired as fiscal of the Rotterdam Admiralty on the instigation of the new Grand Pensionary Laurens Pieter van de Spiegel in February 1788 but he left with Lambert van Eck for Paris. He spoke with Mattheus Lestevenon, and unsuccessfully mediated between the quarreling democratic and aristocratic factions of the exiled Patriots, led by Valckenaer and Van Beyma respectively. The French politicians and ministers received him with much esteem.

Convinced of the ideals of the French Revolution, he turned against slavery and in 1793 published a treatise on the question: In welken zin kunnen de menschen gezegd worden gelijk te zijn? En welke zijn de regten en pligten die daaruit voortvloeien? (In what respect can men be said to be equal? And what are the rights and duties that follow from this equality?). The occasion for the writing of this work was an essay contest organised by Teyler's Theological Society in 1790. Another person won, but Paulus' entry immediately attracted far more attention and enthusiasm, especially among adherents of the Patriot faction. Paulus was even called an "apostle of mankind" by his fans.

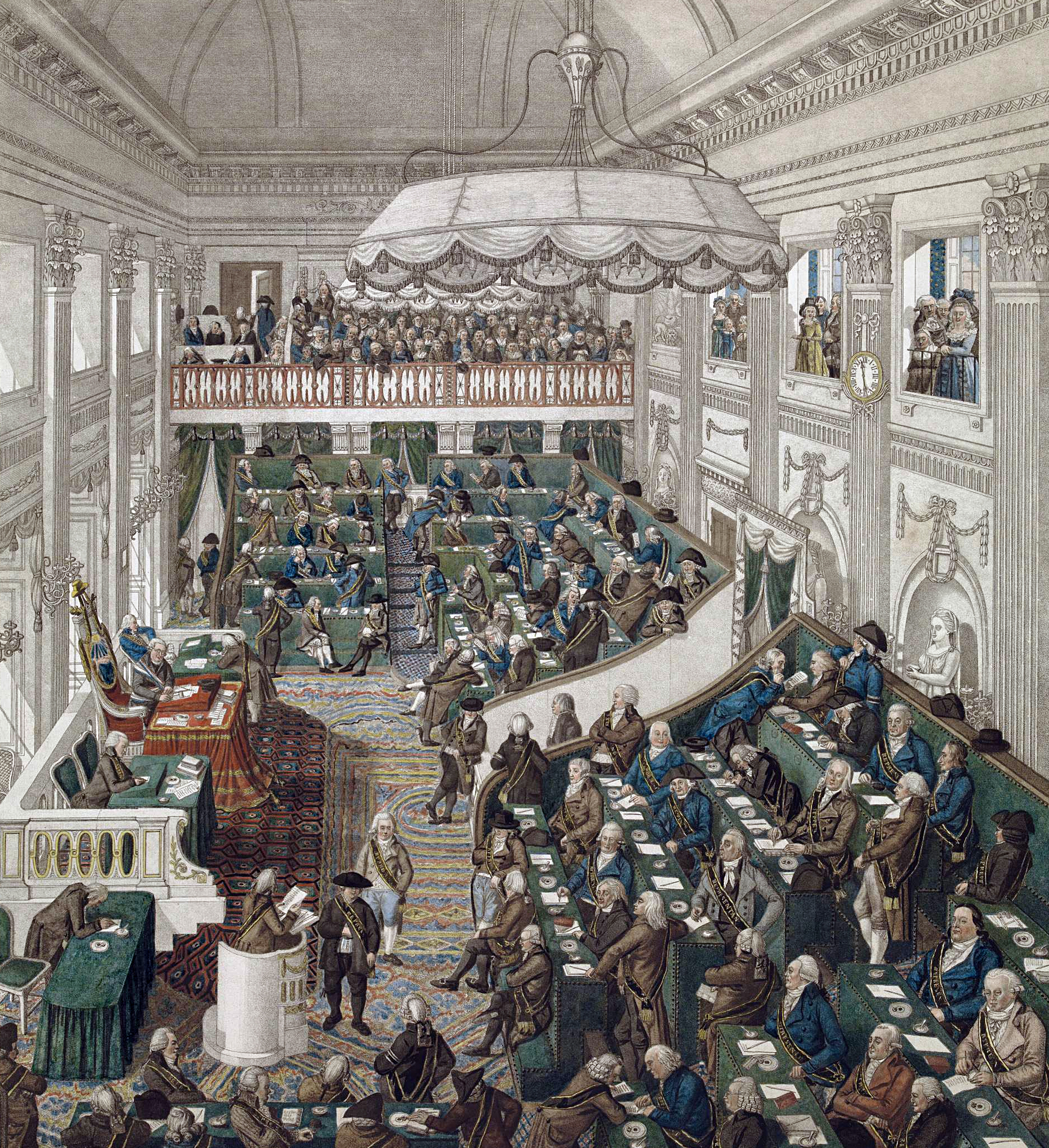
Paulus (center-left) in 1796 as president of the First National Assembly in The Hague. Engraving created in 1797 by George Kockers

In 1795, he was one of the ringleaders of the Batavian Revolution. He was elected the first chairman of the Provisional Representatives of the People of Holland. He played a leading role in this assembly that in its turn had great influence in the Revolutionary States-General, where he led the Holland delegation (he was president of the States-General between 5 March 1795 and 1 May 1795). One of the first actions of the Provisional Representatives was the adoption, on 31 January 1795, of the Dutch version of the Declaration of the Rights of Man and the Citizen, (Note: Publicatie, behelzende de erkentenis en verklaring der Rechten van den Mensch en den Burger, gearresteerd den 31. Januarij 1795. Het eerste jaar der Bataafsche vriheid) which was not simply a translation of the earlier French version, but contained original thought. It was drafted by a commission chaired by Paulus, and leaned on his 1793 treatise on Equality for its philosophical underpinning.

Paulus led the Dutch delegation in the negotiations with the representatives of the Committee of Public Safety of the National Convention of the French First Republic, led by Sieyès and Reubell, in May 1795, which issued in the Treaty of The Hague (1795). Though the conditions in the treaty were onerous for the Batavian Republic, it at least retained its independence, and was recognized as such by its French "sister republic", a result that was far from assured beforehand.

Once the retention of independence was assured and the captured Dutch fleet had been returned to Dutch ownership, Paulus was a leader in the reforms of the Batavian Navy, like the abolition of the old admiralties, and the reform of the officer corps. The administration of the navy was taken over by the standing Committee on Naval Affairs, of which Paulus again became the chairman.

One of the political issues in the Revolutionary States-General was the question of how far to go in democratising the country and making it a unitary state, in which the defenders of the privileges of the Regenten (also those of the "Patriot" persuasion) and of provincial particularism opposed the radical democrats (gaining a large following in the political clubs in the city quarters of the larger cities) and the unitarists. The former wanted as little change in the old constitutional order as possible, while the latter proposed to completely overturn that old order and replace the States-General, and the institutions on which it was based, with a National Assembly for the entire country, elected with male universal suffrage. Paulus was a leading member of a commission of the Provisional Representatives of the People of Holland that presented a proposal on the latter lines to the States-General that was eventually adopted on a vote of 4 provinces (Holland, Utrecht, Overijssel and Gelderland) against 3 by the States-General. Zeeland, Friesland and Groningen remained opposed until in January 1796 popular unrest in those provinces forced the hands of the provincial governments. Elections for the proposed National Assembly of the Batavian Republic were held in early 1796.

On 1 March 1796 Paulus was unanimously elected the first chairman of the National Assembly of the Batavian Republic. At the inauguration, he caught a serious cold (Note: Ramaer tells us that after he walked without a hat in the inaugural parade on March 1, he caught the cold. On March 4 a scandal developed, when an alternate member of the National Assembly, Reinier Bouwens, accused Paulus of having caused the loss of the Dutch Cape Colony in the previous year, because of his role in the bankruptcy of the VOC. Paulus then removed himself from the hall while this was debated, and stood for a long time in a cold and drafty antechamber, which probably contributed to him developing pneumonia on March 7. The National Assembly declared the accusation baseless on March 25 after a thorough investigation of the matter; cf. Ramaer, pp. 759-760.) from which he died, on 17 March 1796 in 's-Gravenhage, aged 42. He was buried in the Scheveningen cemetery Ter Navolging.

== Works ==
- Het nut der stadhouderlijke regeering aangetoond by gelegenheid der geboorte van Willem Frederik, Prince van Oranje en Nassau, et. (1773)
- De origine, progressu et solutione nexus foedalis flandriam inter et zeelandiam (dissertation, Leiden 1775)
- Verklaring van de Unie van Utrecht (4 dln., 1775–1779), dedicated to Joachim Rendorp
- Wat het is, een vry volk te zyn (1783)
- Verhandeling over de vrage: in welken zin kunnen de menschen gezegd worden gelyk te zyn? en welke zijn de regten en pligten, die daaruit voordvloeien? (1793)

== Sources ==
- Aa, A.J. van der, Biographisch woordenboek der Nederlanden. Deel 15 (1872), pp. 126–127 (in Dutch)
- Berg, J.Th.J. van den, De dominee en 'de tweede apostel Paulus' (27 September 2012)
- Gou, L. de (1985) Biografische bijdragen over achttiende eeuwers. Fragmenten van jaarredes gehouden in de algemene vergadering van de Hollandsche Maatschappij der Wetenschappen 1979-1985, pp. 143–69. (in Dutch)
- Roosendaal, J. (2003) Bataven! Nederlandse vluchtelingen in Frankrijk 1787-1795. (in Dutch)
- Vles, E.J. (2004) Pieter Paulus (1753 - 1796) Patriot en Staatsman. (in Dutch)
- Mr. P. Paulus on Dutch Parliament page (in Dutch)
- DBNL entry (in Dutch)
- Ramaer, Paulus, Mr. Pieter in Blok, P.J. and P.C. Molhuysen, Nieuw Nederlandsch biografisch woordenboek, deel 9 (1933), pp. 758–760 (in Dutch)
- Schama, S. (1977), Patriots and Liberators. Revolution in the Netherlands 1780-1813, New York, Vintage books, ISBN 0-679-72949-6
- Suringar, P.H., Biographische aanteekeningen betreffende Pieter Paulus. Eerste gedeelte (1753-1784) (dissertation Leiden, 1879) (in Dutch)
- Wall, E. van der, Geen natie van atheisten. Pieter Paulus (1753-1796) over godsdienst en mensenrechten, in: Jaarboek van de Nederlandse Letterkunde, 1996, pp. 45–58 (in Dutch)
