= Provisional Representatives of the People of Holland =

Arms of the Provisional Representatives of the People of Holland

The Provisional Representatives of the People of Holland (Dutch: Provisionele Representanten van het Volk van Holland (Note: With "Holland" in this case the province of Holland is meant, not the entire country of the Netherlands, which is sometimes called "Holland" in colloquial English.)) was the name given to the supreme governing body of the province of Holland, instituted after the Batavian Revolution, during the period in which the Netherlands was transitioning from the constitution under the Dutch Republic to the new constitution of the Batavian Republic. After the States General of the Batavian Republic had been replaced by the National Assembly of the Batavian Republic, in 1796, the Provisional Representatives, and similar bodies, in all Dutch provinces were abolished.

== Establishment ==
During the Batavian Revolution in Amsterdam an "Amsterdam Revolutionary Committee" took over power in the city from the old vroedschap. This committee sent invitations to all eighteen cities with a right to vote in the States of Holland and West Friesland to attend a constituent assembly in Amsterdam on 24 January 1795. Representatives of fourteen of those cites attended. They decided to go to The Hague (Note: The Hague at the time was not one of the represented cities. Besides, its government was still staunchly Orangist.) two days later to institute a new governing body for the province of Holland, to replace the States of Holland. Representatives of twelve cities (Note: Amsterdam, Delft, Dordrecht, Enkhuizen, Gouda, Haarlem, Leiden, Monnickendam, Purmerend, Rotterdam and Schiedam) convened in the St. Jorisdoelen (Note: The building of the Hague schutterij at the Tournooiveld.) and decided to form the Provisional Representatives of the People of Holland. The cities that had not sent representatives (Note: Brielle, Edam, Gorinchem, Hoorn and Schoonhoven) were invited to send a maximum of four representatives each to the new body. Pieter Paulus, a representative of Rotterdam, was elected chairman of the new assembly. After a short recess the assembled representatives decided to continue the session in the Logement of the city of Haarlem (Note: Each of the cities represented in the States of Holland had a hotel, called "logement" in The Hague, where their representatives found lodging while the States were in session.) which was located a short distance away at the Korte Vijverberg.

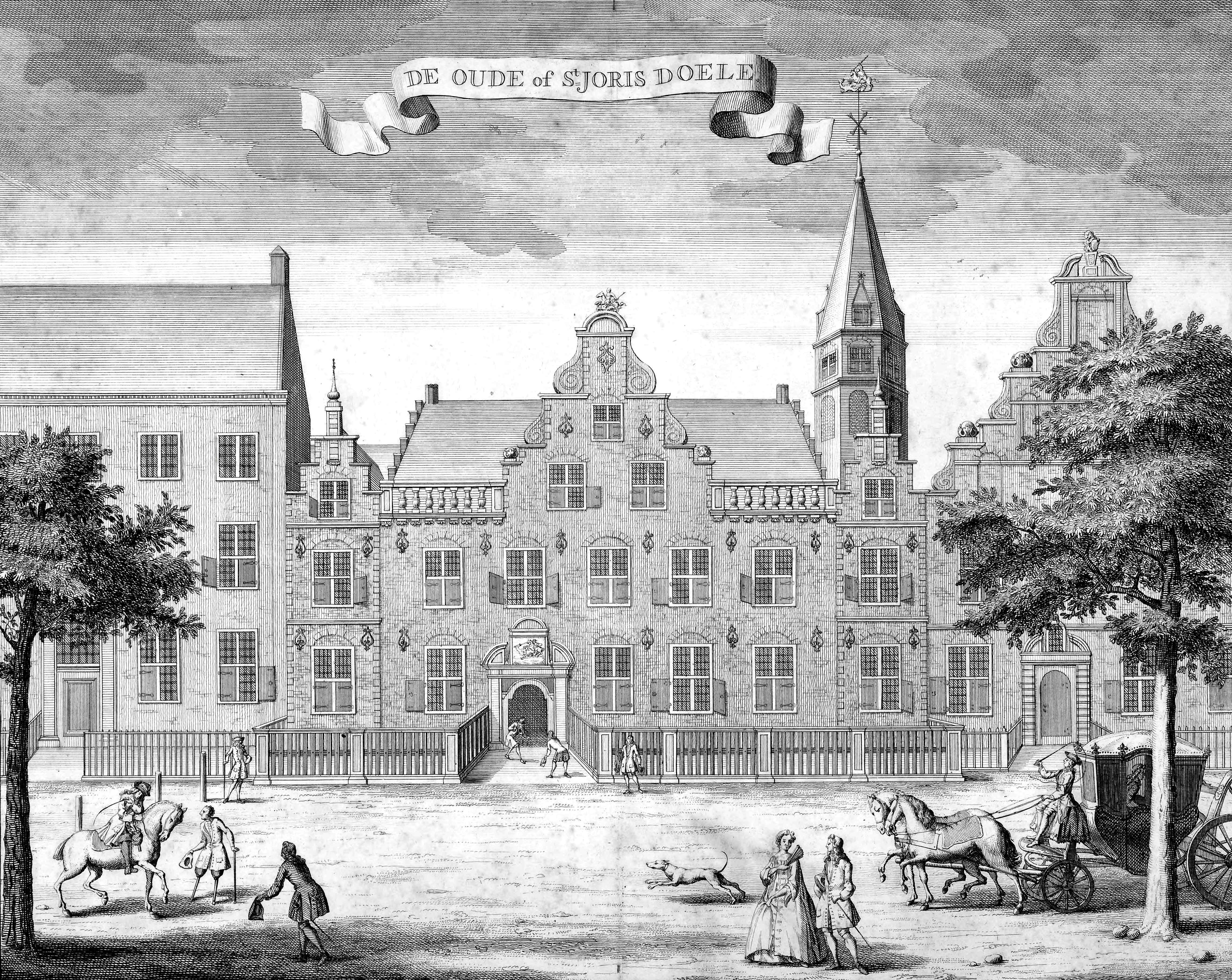
St. Jorisdoelen, the building where the representatives first assembled

From here the Grand Pensionary of the Dutch Republic, Laurens Pieter van de Spiegel, a staunch Orangist, was ordered to make the hall of the States of Holland at the Binnenhof available for the use of the representatives, that same evening. During the evening session Jacobus Spoors and Cornelis de Lange (a Gouda representative) were elected Griffiers of the new body. The States of Holland were formally abolished and its powers assumed by the new assembly.

=== Arrest of Van Spiegel and Bentinck ===
The assembly decided on 28 January 1795 to depose Grand Pensionary Van Spiegel (who was also Keeper of the Seals of the province of Holland), and to impound his seal and official documents. He was arrested six days later and imprisoned in the Gevangenpoort. The baljuw of The Hague, count Willem Bentinck, had already been arrested. With this, the executive of the old States of Holland was overthrown (the stadtholder, William V of Orange, had already resigned and fled to England).

== Organisation ==
Standing committees

Each of the represented entities (Note: Initially the eighteen cities that had been represented in the States, but later also other towns and villages, like The Hague, after the abolition of city rights made all municipalities equal.) was entitled to four representatives, though sometimes less were sent. The assembly was made up of a number of standing committees that were responsible for tasks that were delegated to them. The primus interpares was the Comité van Algemeen Welzijn (Committee of General Welfare, which was clearly inspired by the French Committee of Public Safety). (Note: Another important one was the Comité van Waakzaamheid (Committee of Vigilance), which was the equivalent of the French Committee of General Security.) In a demonstration of constitutional continuity this committee worked according to the 1751 Instruction for the Gecommitteerde Raden (Executive) of the old States of Holland. The committees remained active until the newly elected National Assembly came into being in April 1796.

== Decrees ==
The Provisional Representatives made a number of decrees that often were very consequential for the constitutional history of the Netherlands, even after several regime changes. A selection:

- Declaration of the Rights of Man and of the Citizen (31 January 1795)
- Emancipation of all religious denominations
- Abolition of the States of Holland, and the Ridderschap (Note: The remnant of the medieval Second Estate that in the States of Holland represented the Dutch nobility, and nominally the countryside in the province.)
- Abolition of the offices of Stadtholder, Captain-General of the States Army, Admiral-General of the Navy, and Grand Pensionary
- Declaration of popular sovereignty
- Universal suffrage for all male citizens
- Repeal of the Act of Guarantee and the Oath on the Constitution that accompanied it
- Abolition of the principle of instruction and obligatory consultation (last en ruggespraak) for members of the Provisional Representatives, and replacement of voting by constituency with roll-call voting
- Abolition of city rights

== Sources ==
- Dagbladen van het verhandelde ter vergadering van de Provisionele Representanten van het volk van Holland. 4 dln. (The Hague, 1795-1796).
- Decreeten van de Provisioneele repræsentanten van het volk van Holland. 26 January 1795--2 Maart 1796 ('sLands drukkerij 1799)
- Kretzschmar, L.P.E., P.J. Margry en W.E. Meiboom, Archieven van de Gewestelijke Besturen in de Bataafs-Franse tijd, 1795-1807 en hiermee samenhangende commissies, 1782-1802. 's-Gravenhage, 1987.
- Onderzoeksgids Bestuur en administratie van de Bataafs Franse tijd 1795-1813, J. Roelevink, 2001 e.v.
- Schama, S. (1977), Patriots and Liberators. Revolution in the Netherlands 1780-1813, New York, Vintage books, ISBN 0-679-72949-6
- De geëxtendeerde notulen, behelzende de decreeten van de vergadering der provisioneele representanten van het volk van Holland. Zints XXVI. jann. - XXVIII. febr. MDCCXCV
- Zoodsma, L., Archief van de Provisionele Representanten, 1795-1796 in: L.P.E. Kretzschmar, P.J. Margry en W.E. Meiboom, Archieven van de Gewestelijke Besturen in de Bataafs-Franse tijd, 1795-1807 en hiermee samenhangende commissies, 1782-1802 ( 's-Gravenhage, 1987) pp. 49–166
