= States of Holland and West Friesland =

Historical regional government in the Netherlands

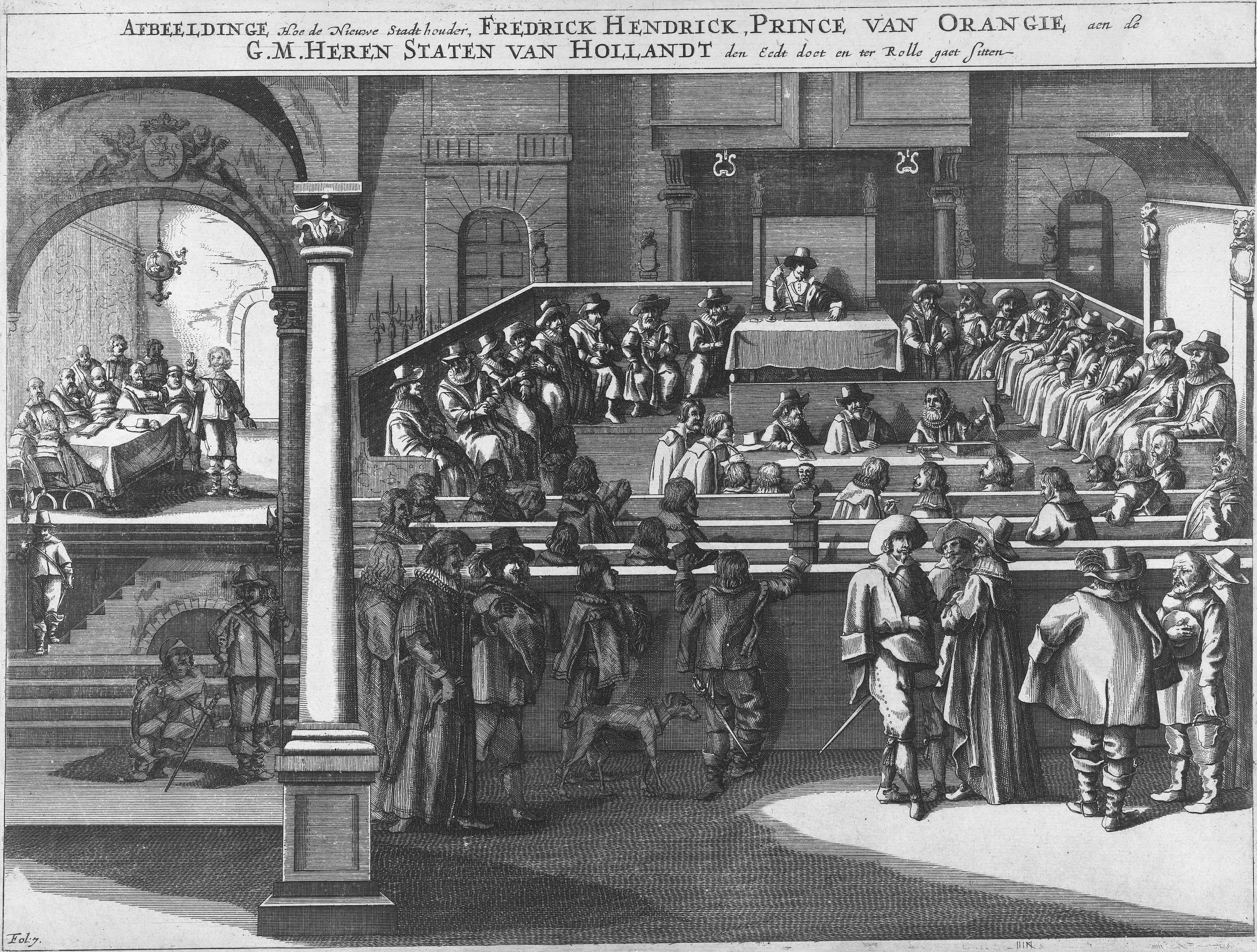
Meeting of the States of Holland and West Friesland in 1625

The States of Holland and West Frisia (Dutch: Staten van Holland en West-Friesland) were the representation of the two Estates (standen) to the court of the Count of Holland. After the United Provinces were formed — and there no longer was a count, but only his "lieutenant" (the stadtholder) — they continued to function as the government of the County of Holland.

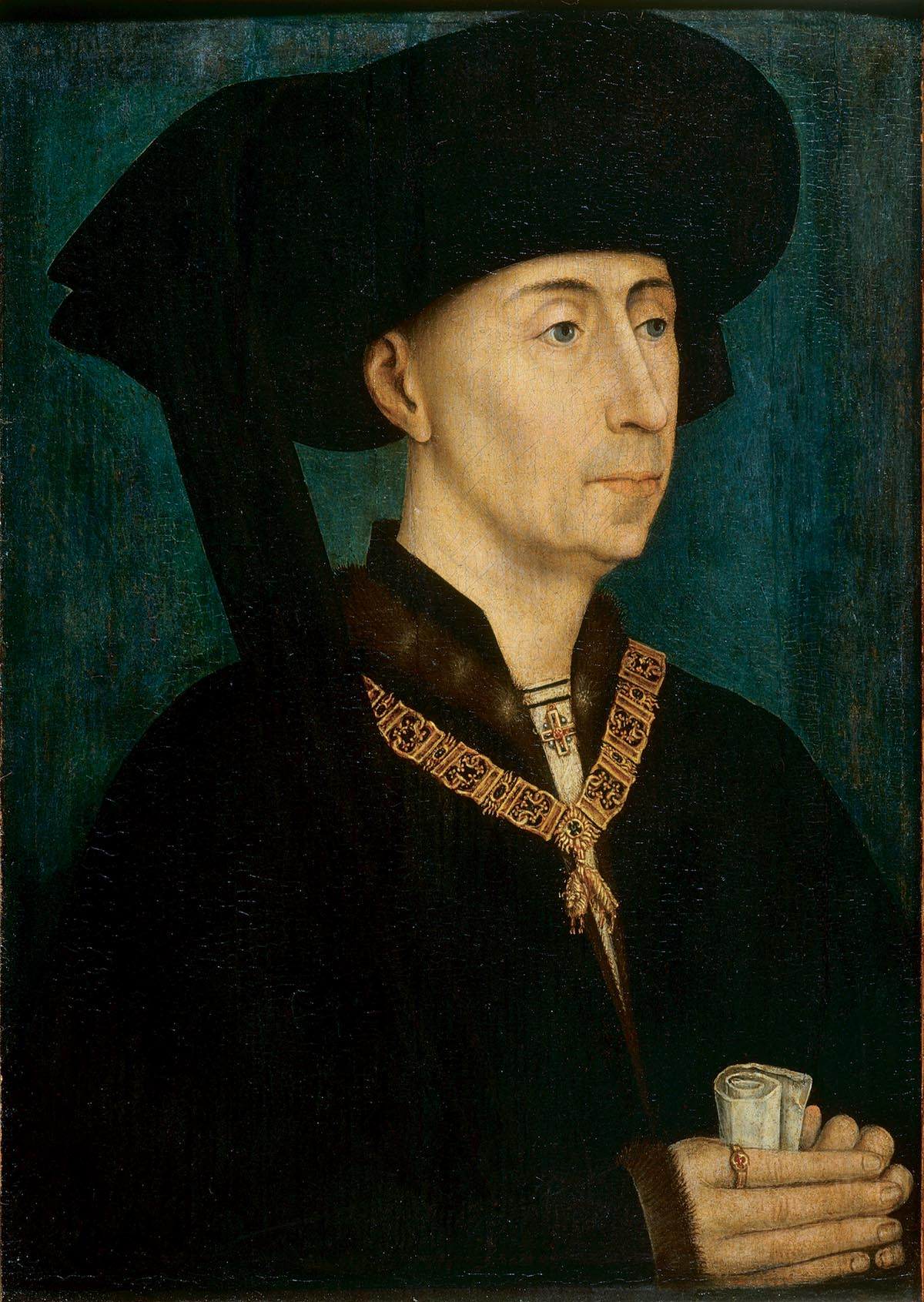
Philip the Good

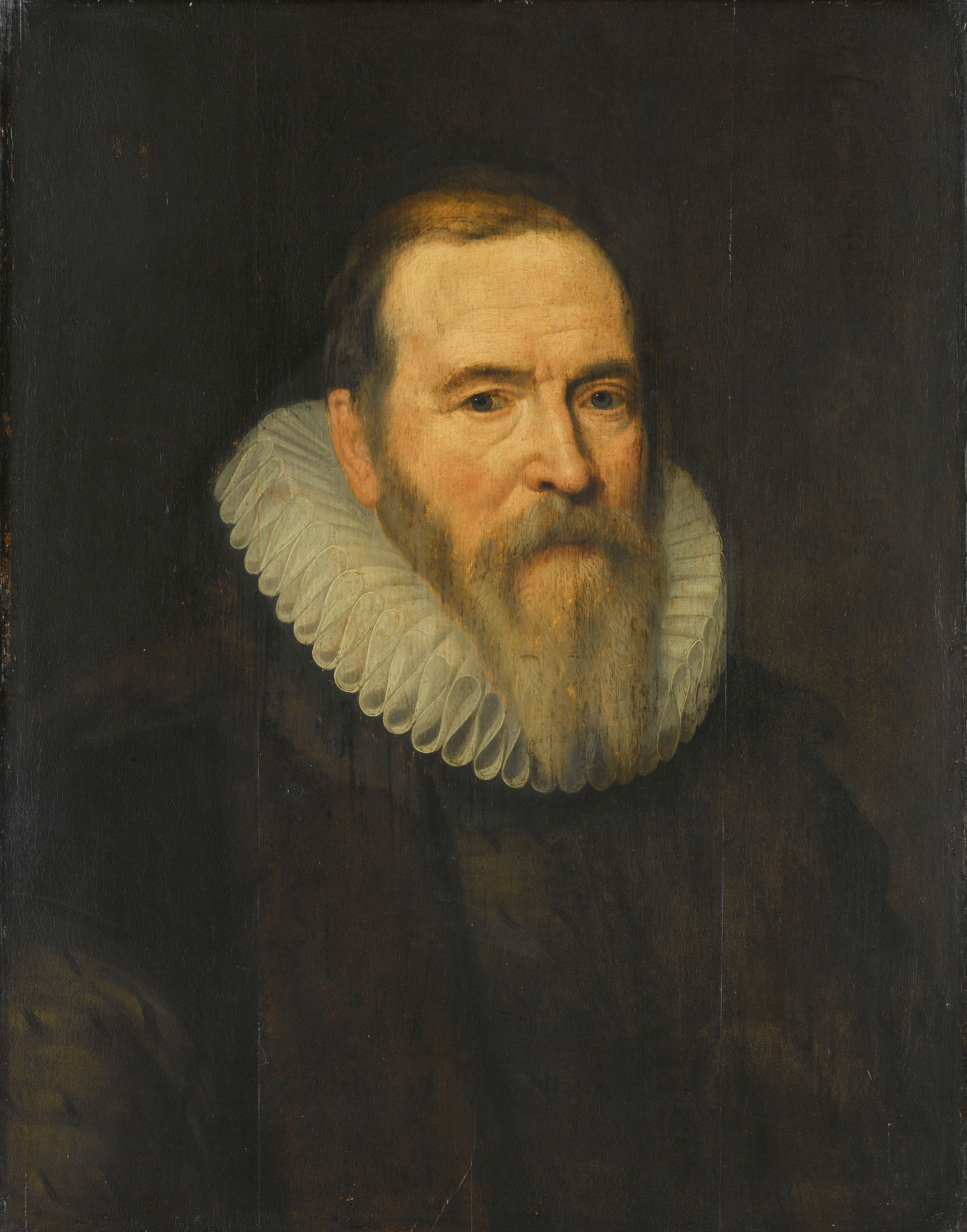
Johan van Oldenbarnevelt

== Organisation ==
The nobility was normally represented by the Land's Advocate of Holland or Grand Pensionary of Holland, who combined the votes of the ten members of the Ridderschap (the "Knighthood") in the estates; the nobility was also supposed to represent all rural interest, including those of the farmers. The Commons consisted of representatives of eighteen cities, in ancient feudal order: eleven of the Southern Quarter: Dordrecht, Haarlem, Delft, Leyden, Amsterdam, Gouda, Rotterdam, Gorinchem, Schiedam, Schoonhoven and Brill; seven of the Northern West Frisian Quarter: Alkmaar, Hoorn, Enkhuizen, Edam, Monnikendam, Medemblik and Purmerend. More powerful cities were allowed to send more representatives — Amsterdam had a delegation of four — but these then together had only one vote. Contrary to other provinces of the Dutch republic, the States of Holland and West Friesland was dominated by cities compared to the rural nobility.

All members of the States were appointed officials, including the Land's Advocate or Grand Pensionary, who was appointed by the States themselves. The Land's Advocate or Grand Pensionary was nearly always a previous pensionary of a city. Very important matters, such as about taxation, had to be decided on unanimously but normally decisions were made by majority. This majority was not reached after a voting procedure, but by a summary at the end of the meeting by the Land's Advocate or the Grand Pensionary of the opinions expressed by the several members present, who would speak according to the feudal order: Dordrecht first, Purmerend last. He had literally both the first — as representing the nobility vote — and the last say in a meeting. Since the death of Johan van Oldenbarnevelt any Prince of Orange also being stadtholder indirectly had much power over the States. He had the right to appoint the mayors of all cities, out of one of two candidates suggested by the appointment college of a city. Mayors of cities with city rights chose the officials who served as representatives in the States of Holland. The States of Holland were disbanded during the reforms by the Batavian Republic.

The States of Holland should not be confused with the States-General, or Staten-Generaal, the confederate government of the Republic of the Seven United Netherlands as a whole. Each of the provinces of the Netherlands had its own States and Holland was just one of seven. Nevertheless, this province was so dominant that a politician controlling the States of Holland by being Land's Advocate of Holland or Grand Pensionary, in fact controlled the Republic. Johan de Witt is a case in point, and Johan van Oldebarnevelt was another famous example.

== History ==
First mentioned in 1428, the States of Holland existed until 1795 when the Batavian Republic was established in the Batavian Revolution. The States of Holland were initially replaced by the Provisional Representatives of the People of Holland, which representative body also took the place of the States in the States General of the Batavian Republic.

== Towns ==
Name	Founding	Incorporation	Arms
The Nobility (Ridderschap)			
Original 6 towns of Holland
Dordrecht	~ 1120	1220	
Haarlem	~950	1245	
Delft	1075	1246	
Leiden	~1150	1266	
Amsterdam	~ 1170	1275	
Rotterdam	~ 950	1340	
Added towns of Holland in 1572 by William the Silent
Alkmaar	~950	1254	
Den Briel		1330	
Edam	~1230	1357	
Enkhuizen		1355	
Gorinchem	~1000	1382	
Gouda	~1139	1272	
Hoorn		1357	
Medemblik		1289	
Monnikendam		1355	
Purmerend		1434	
Schiedam	~1230	1275	
Schoonhoven	~1220	1280	
