= States General of the Batavian Republic =

Dutch government (1795–96)

The States General of the Batavian Republic was the name for the Dutch government between January, 1795 and March 1796. It was nominally the same as the States-General of the Dutch Republic, the predecessor of the Batavian Republic, as the old constitution, the Union of Utrecht remained in place until a new National Assembly of the Batavian Republic was seated after a general election, under universal manhood suffrage. As under the old constitution, the States of the seven provinces remained the basis for representation in the States-General. However, those States were in most cases replaced by new representative bodies, like the Provisional Representatives of the People of Holland. The places of the members of the previous Orangist regime as representatives of the Seven Provinces were now taken by members of the Patriot party. The presidents of the States-General, both under the old and the new Republic, were acting as head of state for their term in office as president (usually a month).

== Dutch heads of state between 1795 and 1796 ==
- Johannes Lambertus Huber 30 March 1795 - 6 April 1795
- Pieter Paulus 5 May 1795 - May 1795
- Jacob George Hieronymus Hahn 19 May 1795 - 2 June 1795
- Willem Aernout de Beveren 6 July 1795 - Sep 1795
- Pieter Paulus Sep 1795 - ?
- Gerrit David Jordens ? - 25 November 1795
- Pieter Pijpers 25 November 1795 - Dec 1795
- Johannes Lambertus Huber Dec 1795 - 1796
