= Maria Margaretha la Fargue =

Dutch artist (1738–1813)

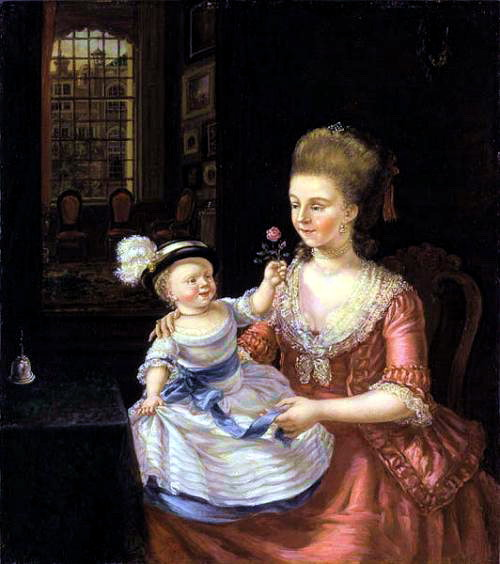
Mother and child by la Fargue

Maria Margaretha la Fargue (1738–1813) was an 18th-century painter from the Dutch Republic.

La Fargue was the daughter of the notary and orangist pamphletist Jean Thomas la Fargue (c. 1700–1774) and Charlotte Constantia van Nieuwland (1703–1785). Her father was a fleeing Huguenot. She had four older brothers. She learned to draw and paint from her brothers Paulus Constantijn la Fargue (1729–1782) and Jacob Elias la Fargue (1735–1776?), who were probably autodidacts. Maria la Fargue is best known for her cityscapes, genre paintings and prints.

Together with her brothers she worked in a family studio where they produced prints and illustrations for books. For example, she made prints for the Haagsche princelyke and koninglyke almanach of 1788. After the studio went bankrupt, La Fargue started giving drawing lessons. However, it became more and more difficult for her to make ends meet, until she became dependent on the dispensation of the Church. She died at the age of 75 in the hospital and refugee home on the Lange Beestenmarkt.
