= Batavian Republic =

Sister republic of France (1795–1806)

Batavian Republic (1795–1801) Bataafse Republiek (Dutch) Batavian Commonwealth (1801–1806) Bataafs Gemenebest (Dutch)
- 1795–1806
- National flag Great Seal (1796)
- Motto: Gelykheid, Vryheid, Broederschap ("Equality, Liberty, Fraternity")
- The Batavian Republic in 1797

- Batavian departments in 1801
- Status: Sister republic of the French First Republic and First French Empire
- Capital: The Hague
- Largest city: Amsterdam
- Official languages: Dutch; French
- Common languages: Frisian; German; Dutch Low Saxon
- Demonym: Batavian
- Government: Unitary revolutionary republic
- Executive Government
  - 1795: Revolutionary Comm.
  - 1795–1796: States-General
  - 1796–1798: National Assembly
  - 1798–1801: Executive Authority
  - 1801–1805: State Council
  - 1805–1806: Rutger Jan Schimmelpenninck
  - 1806: Carel de Vos van Steenwijk
- Historical era: French Revolutionary Wars; Napoleonic Wars
  - Batavian Revolution: 1781–1795
  - Transfer of power: 18–19 January 1795
  - Hague Treaty: 16 May 1795
  - Kingdom of Holland: 5 June 1806

Population
  - 1795: 1,883,009
  - 1806: 2,178,000
- Currency: Guilder
| Preceded by | Succeeded by |
| Dutch Republic | Kingdom of Holland |
- Today part of: Netherlands; Belgium; Germany

History of the Low Countries (schematic)
| Frisii | | Germanic tribes | | Belgae & Celts | | | |
| Frisii | Cana– nefates (Note: Roman foederati) | Chamavi, Tubantes (Note: The Chamavi merged into the confederation of the Franks; the Tubantes merged into the confederation of the Saxons.) | | Gallia Belgica (55 BC–c. 5th century AD); Germania Inferior (83–c. 5th century) | | | |
| Frisii | Cana– nefates | Salian Franks | | Batavi | | | |
| unpopulated (4th –c. 5th centuries) | | Saxons | Salian Franks (4th–c. 5th centuries) | | | | |
| Frisian Kingdom (c. 6th century – 734) | | Saxons | Frankish Kingdom (481–843)—Carolingian Empire (800–843) | | | | |
| Frisian Kingdom (c. 6th century – 734) | | Austrasia (511–687) | | | | | |
| Middle Francia (843–855) | | | | West; Francia (from 843) | Middle Francia (843–855) | | |
| Kingdom of Lotharingia (Note: Part of East Francia after 939, divided in Upper Lorraine (as part of West Francia) and Lower Lorraine (as part of East Francia) in 959.) (855–959); Duchy of Lower Lorraine (Note: Lower Lorraine—also referred to as Lothier—disintegrated into several smaller independent territories and only the title of a "Duke of Lothier" remained, held by Brabant.) (from 959) | | | Kingdom of Lotharingia (855–959); Duchy of Lower Lorraine (from 959) | West; Francia (from 843) | Kingdom of Lotharingia (855–959); Duchy of Lower Lorraine (from 959) | | |
| Frisia | | | Kingdom of Lotharingia (855–959); Duchy of Lower Lorraine (from 959) | County of Flanders (Note: Including County of Artois (part of Flanders until 1237) and Tournaisis.) (862–1384) | Kingdom of Lotharingia (855–959); Duchy of Lower Lorraine (from 959) | | |
| Frisian; Freedom (Note: Lordship of Frisia and Lordship of Groningen (including the Ommelanden) after 1524 and 1536 respectively.) (11th–16th centuries) | County of Holland (Note: Including County of Zeeland, that was ruled by neighboring County of Holland and County of Flanders (until 1432).) (880–1432) | Bishopric of Utrecht (Note: Utrecht included Lordship of Overijssel (until 1528), County of Drenthe (until 1528) and County of Zutphen (until 1182).) (695–1456) | Duchy of Brabant (Note: Duchy of Brabant included since 1288 also the Duchy of Limburg (now part of Belgium's Liège Province) and the "Overmaas" lands Dalhem, Valkenburg and Herzogenrath (now part of the Dutch Province of Limburg).) (1183–1430) Duchy of Guelders (Note: The county, later duchy, of Guelders consisted of four quarters, as they were separated by rivers: situated upstream Upper Quarter (the present day northern half of the Dutch province of Limburg), spatially separated from the three downstream Lower Quarters: County of Zutphen (after 1182), Veluwe Quarter and Nijmegen Quarter. The three lower quarters emerged from the historic gau Hamaland (named after the Chamavi tribe), and formed the present day province of Gelderland. Guelders did not include the Cleves enclave Huissen and the independent counties of Buren and Culemborg, that were much later seceded to the province of Gelderland.) (1046–1543) | County of Flanders (862–1384) | County of Hainaut (1071–1432) County of Namur (981–1421) | Prince- Bishopric of Liège (Note: Throughout the Middle Ages, the bishopric was further expanded with the Duchy of Bouillon in 1096 (ceded to France in 1678), the acquisition of the county of Loon in 1366 and the county of Horne in 1568. The Lordship of Mechelen was also part of the Prince-Bishopric of Liège.)(980–1791) | Duchy of Luxembourg (1059–1443) |
| Frisian; Freedom (11th–16th centuries) | Burgundian Netherlands (1384–1482) | | | | | Prince- Bishopric of Liège (980–1791) | Burgundian Netherlands (1384–1482) |
| Habsburg Netherlands (1482–1795) (Seventeen Provinces after 1543) (Note: The name Seventeen Provinces came in use after the Habsburg emperor Charles V had re-acquired the Duchy of Guelders, and an continuous territory arose.) | | | | | | Prince- Bishopric of Liège (980–1791) | Habsburg Netherlands (1482–1795) (Seventeen Provinces after 1543) |
| Dutch Republic (1581–1795) | | | | Spanish Netherlands (1556–1714) | | Prince- Bishopric of Liège (980–1791) | Spanish Netherlands (1556–1714) |
| Dutch Republic (1581–1795) | | | | Austrian Netherlands (1714–1795) | | Prince- Bishopric of Liège (980–1791) | Austrian Netherlands (1714–1795) |
| Dutch Republic (1581–1795) | | | | United States of Belgium (1790) | | Republic of Liège (1789–'91) | United States of Belgium (1790) |
| Dutch Republic (1581–1795) | | | | Austrian Netherlands (1795–1797) | | P.-Bish. of Liège (1791–1794) | Austrian Netherlands (1795–1797) |
| Batavian Republic (1795–1806); Kingdom of Holland (1806–1810) | | | associated with French First Republic (1795–1804) part of First French Empire (1804–1815) | | | | |
| part of First French Empire (1810–1813) | | | associated with French First Republic (1795–1804) part of First French Empire (1804–1815) | | | | |
| Sovereign Principality of the Netherlands (1813–1815) | | | associated with French First Republic (1795–1804) part of First French Empire (1804–1815) | | | | |
| United Kingdom of the Netherlands (1815–1830) | | | | | | | Grand Duchy of Luxembourg (from 1815) |
| Kingdom of the Netherlands (from 1839) | | | | Kingdom of Belgium (from 1830) | | | Grand Duchy of Luxembourg (from 1815) |
| Kingdom of the Netherlands (from 1839) | | | | Kingdom of Belgium (from 1830) | | | Grand Duchy of Luxembourg (from 1890) |

The Batavian Republic (Note: Dutch: Bataafse Republiek; French: République Batave) was the successor state to the Republic of the Seven United Netherlands. It was proclaimed on 19 January 1795 after the Batavian Revolution and ended on 5 June 1806, with the accession of Louis Bonaparte to the Dutch throne. From October 1801 onward, it was known as the Batavian Commonwealth. (Note: Dutch: Bataafs Gemenebest) Both names refer to the Germanic tribe of the Batavi, representing both the Dutch ancestry and their ancient quest for liberty in their nationalist lore.

In early 1795, intervention by the French Republic led to the downfall of the old Dutch Republic. The new republic enjoyed widespread support from the Dutch populace and was the product of a genuine popular revolution. However, it was founded with the armed support of the French Revolutionary Army. The Batavian Republic became a client state, the first of the "sister republics", and later part of the French Empire of Napoleon. Its politics were deeply influenced by the French, who supported three different coups d'état to bring the different political factions to power that France favoured at different moments in its own political development. Nevertheless, the process of creating a written Dutch constitution was mainly driven by internal political factors and not by French influence until Napoleon forced the Dutch government to accept his brother, Louis Bonaparte, as monarch.

The political, economic, and social reforms that were brought about during the relatively short duration of the Batavian Republic have had a lasting impact. The confederal structure of the old Dutch Republic was permanently replaced by a unitary state. For the first time in Dutch history, the constitution that was adopted in 1798 had a genuinely democratic character. For a time, the Republic was governed democratically, although a coup d'état in 1801 put an authoritarian regime in power after another change to the constitution. The influence of this period helped smooth the transition to a more democratic government in 1848 (the constitutional revision by Johan Rudolph Thorbecke, limiting the power of the king). A type of ministerial government was introduced for the first time in Dutch history and many of the current government departments date their history back to this period.

Though the Batavian Republic was a client state of France, its successive governments tried to maintain a degree of independence and to serve Dutch interests even where they clashed with the interests of the French. This clash of interests led to the eventual demise of the Republic when the short-lived experiment with the regime of "Grand Pensionary" Rutger Jan Schimmelpenninck proved unsatisfactory to Napoleon. The subsequent king Louis Bonaparte also refused to follow French dictates, which ultimately led in turn to his downfall in 1810 when the territory was incorporated into the French Empire.

== Background ==
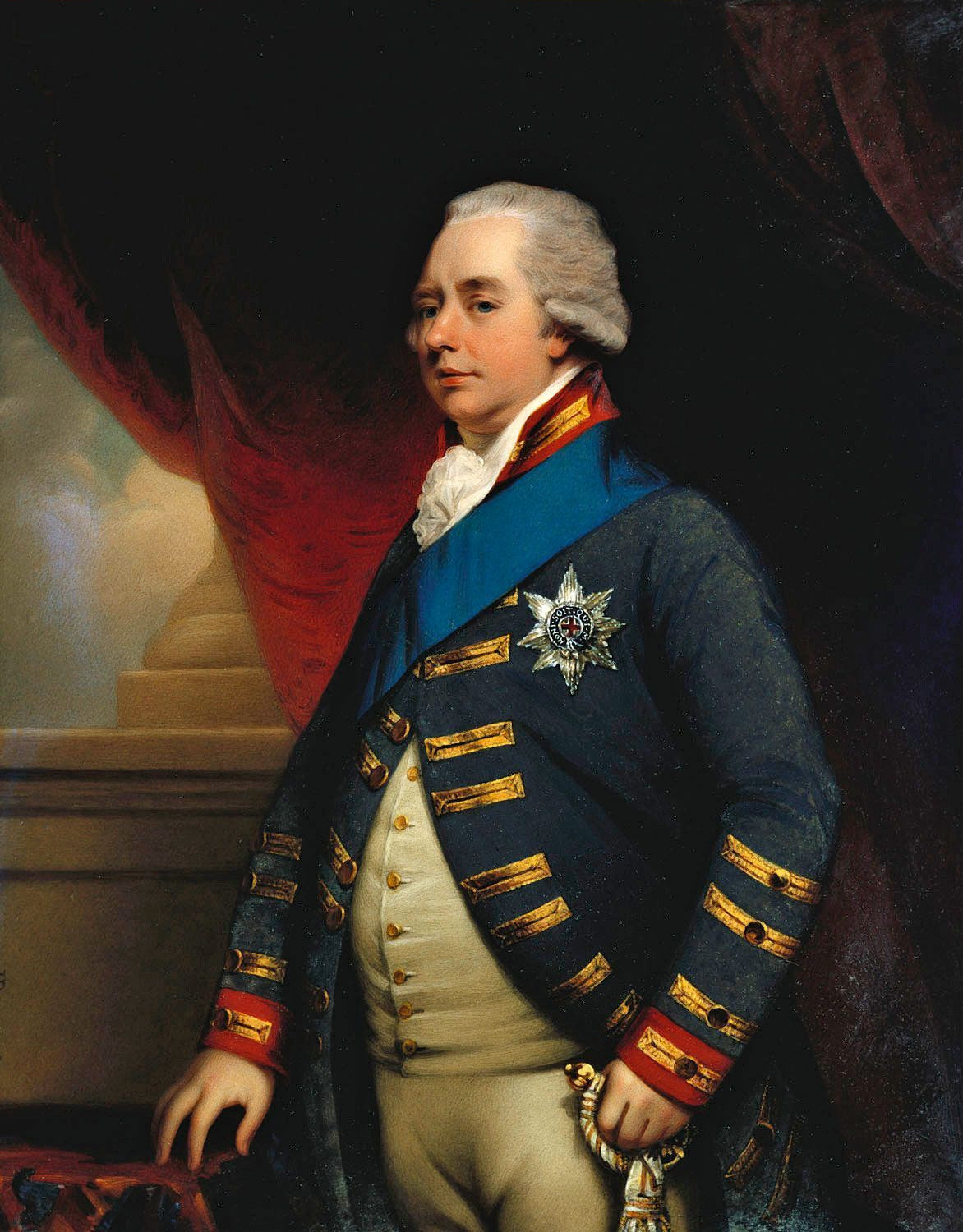
William V of Orange-Nassau

Due to the disastrous Fourth Anglo-Dutch War, the Patriot party revolted against the authoritarian regime of Stadtholder William V but were quickly struck down through the intervention of William's brother-in-law Frederick William II of Prussia in September 1787. Most Patriots went into exile in France, while the Netherlands' own "ancien régime" strengthened its grip on Dutch government chiefly through the Orangist Grand Pensionary Laurens Pieter van de Spiegel. This de facto status of Anglo-Prussian protectorate was internationally formalised in 1788 by the Act of Guarantee (for which Great Britain and Prussia acted as guarantors) and the Triple Alliance between the Dutch Republic, Prussia, and Great Britain. The Netherlands was little more than a pawn for the major powers.

The French Revolution embraced many of the political ideas that the Patriots had espoused in their own revolt. The Patriots enthusiastically supported the Revolution, and when the French revolutionary armies started to spread the revolution, the Patriots joined in, hoping to liberate their own country from its authoritarian yoke. The Stadtholder joined the ill-fated First Coalition of countries in their attempt to subdue the suddenly anti-Austrian French First Republic. The Patriots sought French revolutionary aid in their struggle against the Stadtholder, but did not want to be considered territory conquered by France, but rather a "sister republic". There was open warfare, with the Patriots' cause dependent on its success on the battlefield. With the defeat of allies of the Stadtholder at Battle of Fleurus, Austria abandoned its interest in the southern Netherlands. French revolutionary forces were able to take advantage of the freezing of rivers in December 1794 and forced the Stadtholder into exile.

== Creation of the Republic ==
The French Revolutionary War proceeded disastrously for the forces of the Stadtholder. In the severe winter of 1794/95 a French army under General Charles Pichegru, with a Dutch contingent under General Herman Willem Daendels, crossed the great frozen rivers that traditionally protected the Netherlands from invasion. Aided by the fact that a substantial proportion of the Dutch population looked favourably upon the French incursion, and often considered it a liberation, the French were quickly able to break the resistance of the forces of the Stadtholder and his Austrian and British allies. However, in many cities revolution broke out even before the French arrived and Revolutionary Committees took over the city governments, and (provisionally) the national government as well. William was forced to flee to England on a fishing boat on 18 January 1795.

== Historical stages of the Republic ==
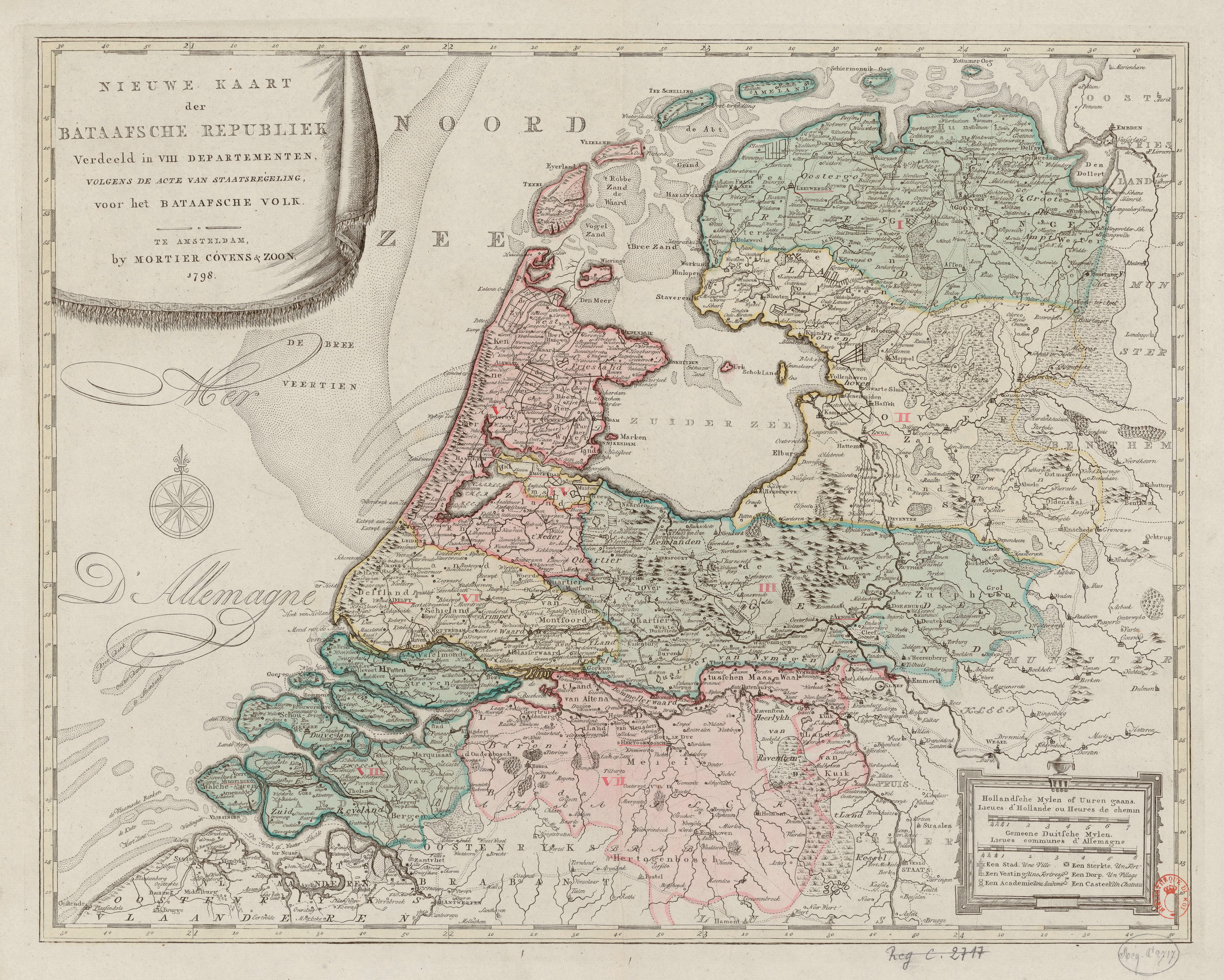
Map of the Batavian Republic in 1798 by Mortier Covens

The French presented themselves as liberators. But there were acrimonious negotiations between the representatives of the new Batavian Republic and those of the French Republic, and a harsh Treaty of The Hague was concluded on 16 May 1795. In addition to imposing territorial concessions and a huge indemnity, the treaty obligated the Dutch to maintain a French army of occupation of 25,000 men. To fulfil its responsibilities, Dutch financier Pieter Stadnitski joined a committee at the end of July 1795. To beat hyperinflation it was announced that from 3 August French soldiers in the Batavian Republic would be paid in sound Dutch currency and going forward no one could be obliged to accept French assignats. This changed the Dutch republic from a client state of Great Britain and Prussia into a French one; (Note: The qualification of the Batavian Republic as a French client state is usually uncontroversial. That its predecessor was an Anglo-Prussian client state is less so. However, the qualification seems justified in view of the Triple Alliance (1788) between the Dutch Republic, Great Britain and Prussia, which guaranteed the Stadtholderate and more or less formally subjected Dutch foreign policy to British direction.) henceforth it would conduct a foreign and military policy dictated by France, where its predecessor had followed British dictates since 1787 (an offensive and defensive alliance of the two republics was part of the treaty). With the treaty, economic policies would in effect also be made subservient to the interests of France, but this did not mean that it lost its independence in all respects. The program of reform that the Dutch revolutionaries attempted to put in place, constrained by the political realities of the French revolution, was mostly driven by Dutch needs and aspirations. The political events in the Netherlands were mainly derived from Dutch initiative, with some notable exceptions. The French were responsible for at least one of the coups d'état, and the French ambassador often acted as a proconsul.

=== Revolutionary States-General ===
Ensign of the Batavian Navy ("Bataafsche vlag").

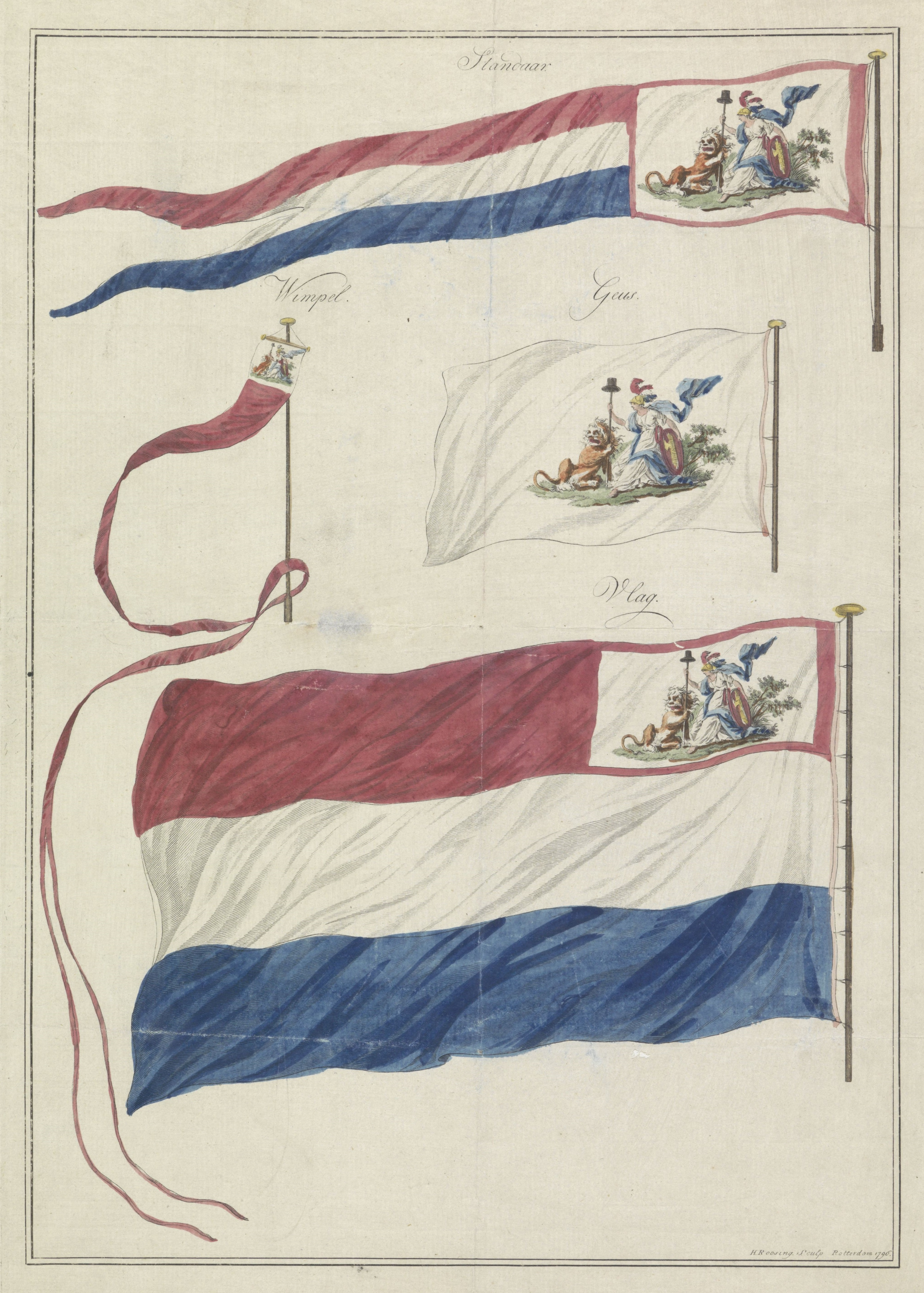
Naval flag and pennants of the Batavian Republic. The canton features the Netherlands Maiden.

At first, the revolutionaries used the constitutional machinery of the old confederal republic. They resumed where they had left off after the purge in 1787 of Patriot regents, taking over the offices of the Orangist regents that were now purged in their turn. (Note: For instance, the States of Holland and West Friesland were replaced by having the 18 cities that formally were represented in those States send representatives to a constituent assembly that formally abolished the States and founded a new body, the Provisional Representatives of the People of Holland, that took over the functions of the States of Holland as long as the States General continued to exist.) Though the political make-up of the States General changed appreciably because of this change in personnel, it retained a number of defenders of the old particularist interests. The first order of business of the revolutionaries therefore was to strive for the reform of the confederal state, with its discrimination of the Generality Lands, and of particular minorities (Catholics, Jews), in the direction of a unitary state, in which the minorities would be emancipated, and the old entrenched interests superseded by a more democratic political order. (Note: The revolutionary States-General had already proclaimed its own version of the Declaration of the Rights of Man and of the Citizen in March 1795.) As a first step the representatives of Brabant were admitted to the States General.

However, a grass-roots democratic movement began to form in the Summer of 1795, consisting of popular societies (clubs) and wijkvergaderingen (precinct meetings), demanding popular influence on the government. A kind of parallel government in the form of "general assemblies" sprang up next to the city governments and the provincial States that repeatedly came into conflict with the established order. In the Fall of 1795 the States General started to work on a procedure to peacefully replace itself, "by constitutional means", with a National Assembly that would possess full executive, legislative and constituent powers. This project at first met with sharp resistance from the conservatives. In some cases even force was used (as in Friesland and Groningen) to overcome this opposition. The new National Assembly convened in The Hague on 1 March 1796.

=== Struggle for a constitution ===
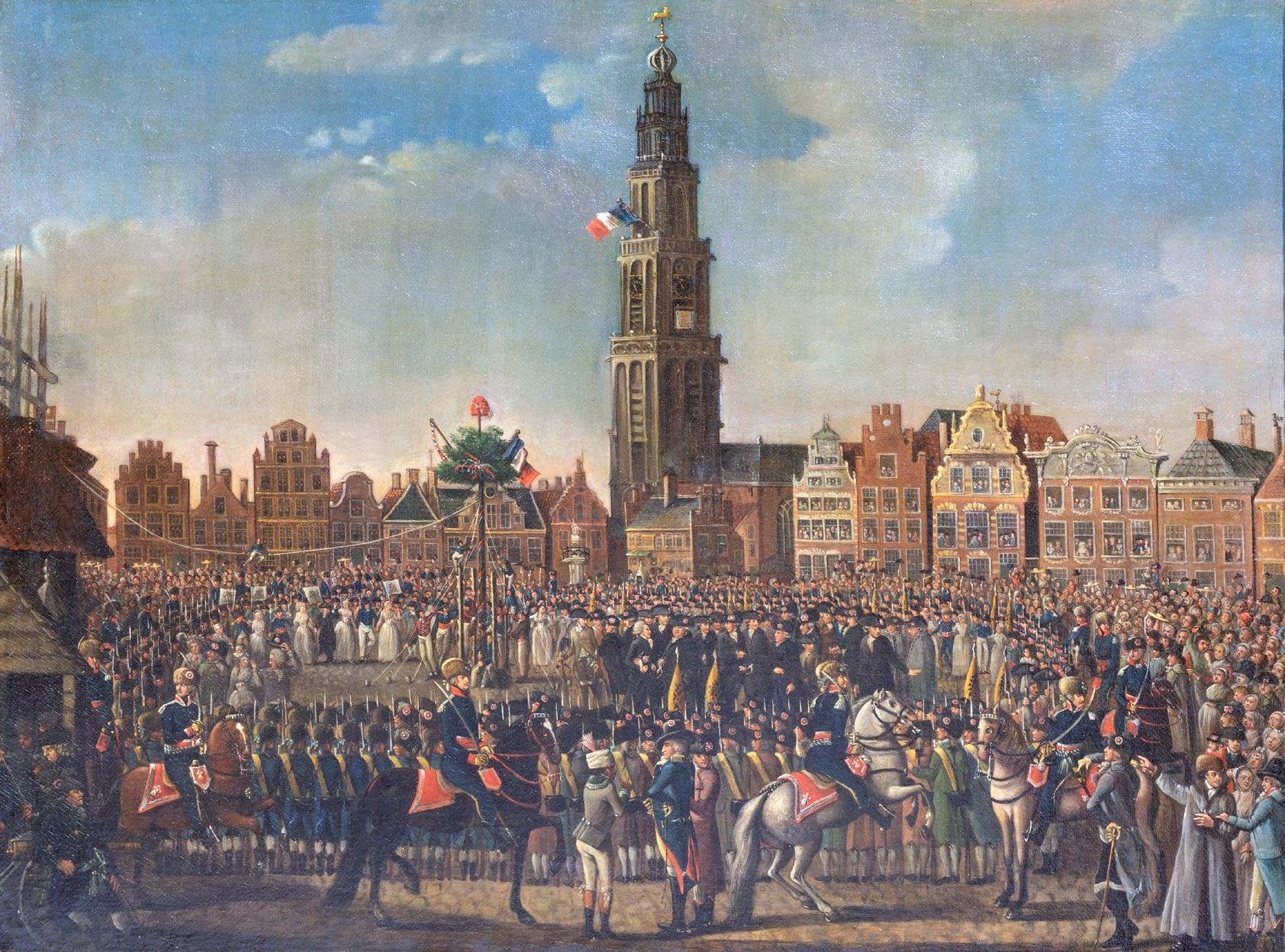
Tree of Liberty in Groningen, 1795

Like the old revolutionary States-General, the new National Assembly contained radically opposed parties: the unitary democrats, led by Pieter Vreede, Johan Valckenaer and Pieter Paulus, and the federalists, such as Jacob Abraham de Mist and Gerard Willem van Marle. But there was a broad continuum of opinion between these poles. In this force-field the federalists held the upper hand after the sudden demise of Paulus (who might otherwise have acted as a unifier). The conservative federalists were more adept at parliamentary manoeuvring. Rutger Jan Schimmelpenninck proved himself especially adept at this. The frustration this engendered among the democrats led them to appeal to popular opinion and to extra-parliamentary action. Meanwhile, the Assembly installed a constitutional commission that in November 1796 presented a report that amounted to a continuation of the old federal arrangements. As this was totally unacceptable to the unitarists, this draft was subsequently amended into its opposite, by a compromise that finally formed a basis for a new Constitution. The Assembly now began discussing other important matters, such as the separation between church and state, and the emancipation of minorities. The organs of the state were to be a bicameral Legislative Corps, to be elected in indirect elections, and a Directory-like Executive of five members. The end result looked much like the French Constitution of 1795. This was approved by the Assembly on 10 May 1797.

The draft-Constitution was to be subjected to a referendum on 8 August 1797, after a very lively campaign in which the French ambassador Noël weighed in with a supportive appeal. This probably contributed to the resounding defeat of the proposal (108,761 votes to 27,995). The Assembly was back at square one. At this moment foreign events in the form of the 18 Fructidor coup of General Charles-Pierre Augereau intervened. This brought the more radical faction to power in France, which proved to be ultimately less patient with the vagaries of the Dutch political process, and more prone to intervene. Elections for a second National Assembly returned one in which the balance of power had shifted to the unitarists in the Fall of 1797. Nevertheless, the federalists managed to retain control of the new constitutional commission by a bare majority. This led to more dawdling and the unitarists in the Assembly now came with their own proposal in the form of the Declaration of 43 on 12 December 1797, containing a nine-point manifesto concerning the minimum conditions to which the new constitution should conform.

Now the course of events started to speed up. The new French ambassador Charles-François Delacroix took the side of the radicals. His behaviour sufficiently intimidated the opponents of the radical proposals to actually fall in line. The coup that was to follow was therefore in reality superfluous. Nevertheless, the radicals, led by Wybo Fijnje and Willem Ockerse, in collaboration with Pierre Auguste Brahain Ducange, the secretary of the French ambassador, now started to plot the coup d'état of 21–22 January 1798, which, with the assistance of General Herman Willem Daendels, put the radicals in power. (Note: Vreede, who is also credited with being a coup leader, was actually sick in bed at the time, though he had put his approval to the project beforehand.) A rump assembly of about fifty radicals declared itself a Constituante, which in one fell swoop enacted the entire radical program, while the other members of the Assembly were forcibly detained. All provincial sovereignties were repealed; the dissident members of the Assembly expelled; an "interim Executive Directory" empowered; and the constitutional commission reduced to seven radical members.

Though the resulting constitution has sometimes been depicted as a French project, it was actually a result of the constitutional commission's discussions between October 1797 and January 1798. Except for the purge of the electoral rolls of "crypto-Orangists" and other reactionaries, it might therefore have been acceptable for the moderates, obviating the need for the January coup. In any case, the "suggestions" of Delacroix were rejected and the constitutional commission insisted on the following three essential points: universal manhood suffrage, without fiscal qualifications. (Note: There were some qualifications, however. Domestic servants were excluded, as were men receiving public charity. The electoral system had a two-tier structure, in which primary assemblies of about 500 voters elected by voice-vote representatives to the second tier of electoral assemblies. Candidates for these secondary assemblies were required to be men of some substance, paying a certain amount of taxes. In other words, there were eligibility requirements for the passive suffrage. But these requirements did not amount to census suffrage for the franchise as such. Though the republic had adopted a Declaration of Rights which in principle extended to women also, this was not yet driven so far that the franchise was extended to women. The fact that the early Dutch feminist Etta Palm d'Aelders was under arrest as a suspected spy at the time, probably did not advance the cause of women's suffrage.) the right of revision of the constitution at quinquennial intervals by the voters; and finally the rejection of the principle of a bicameral legislature, in which each House would have a separate electoral base. (Note: The constitution provided for a legislature, divided into two chambers, but those were elected as a whole and then divided by lot; this was actually a concession to spare French sensibilities.)

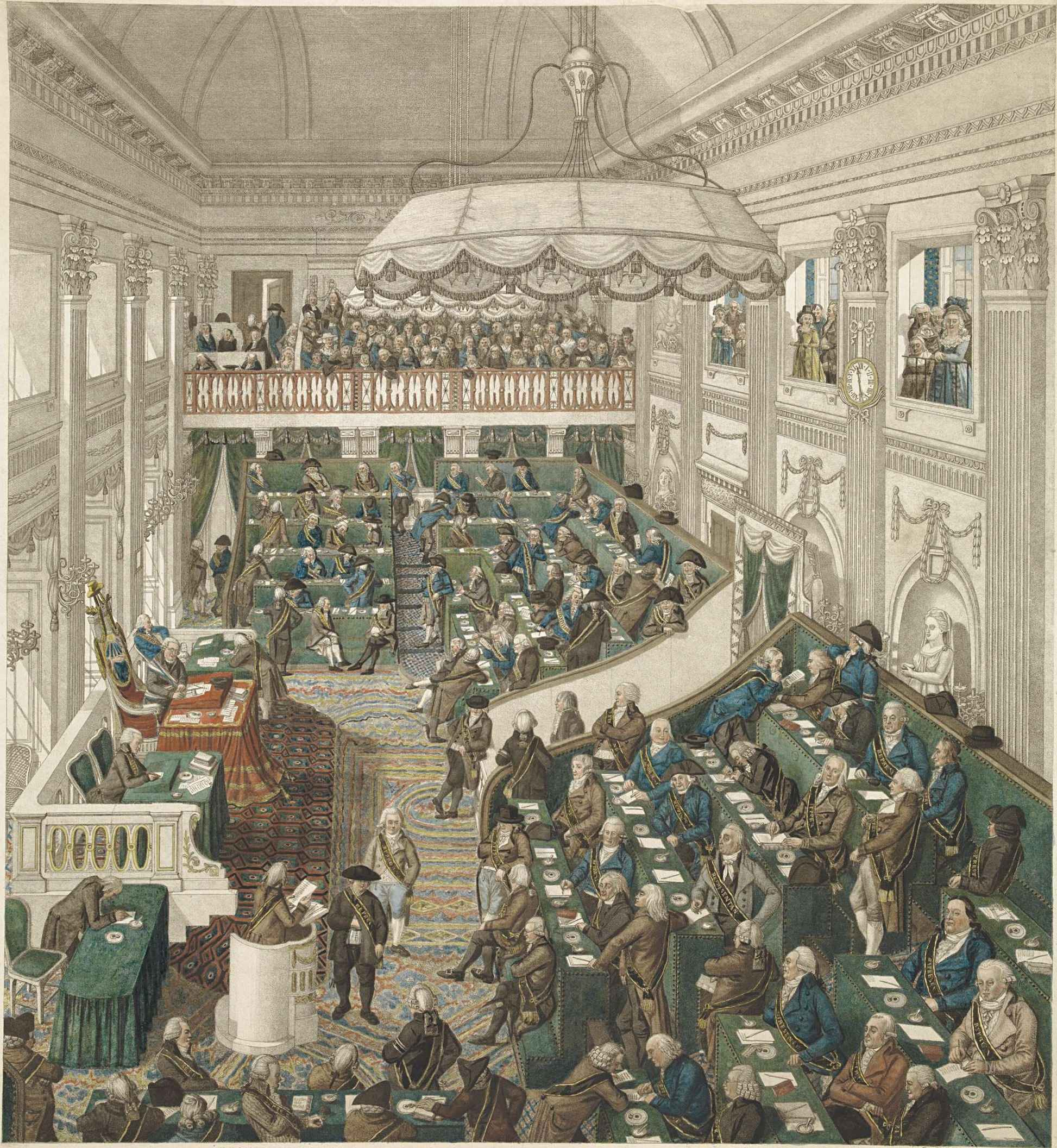
First session of the National Assembly in The Hague, from March 1796 to August 1797

Though the coup of 22 January 1798 did not bode well for a genuinely democratic approval process for the new constitution (and the French would have preferred going the "safe" way of approval by the rump assembly) the 1798 constitutional referendum had a democratic quality. On 23 April 1798, the Staatsregeling voor het Bataafsche Volk was approved with 153,913 votes against 11,587 (i.e., just 641 more people voted for approval in 1798 than had voted for rejection of the previous draft in 1797; about 50% of the electorate had voted.) The new regime therefore seemed well-grounded in the new doctrine of popular sovereignty.

The new constitution addressed many of the reformist concerns of the Patriots since 1785, including no hereditary offices; no sinecures; and accountability of officials. It also came down on the side of economic liberalism, as opposed to mercantilism, in the economic debate then raging in republican circles, and therefore promised to do away with guilds and internal impediments to trade. The old provincial-repartition system of public finance was to be replaced by a system of national taxation. There was to be a five-man Uitvoerend Bewind as a collective Executive, with eight national Agenten (government ministers) doing the actual Administration, directing Foreign Affairs, Police and Interior, Justice, Finance, War, Navy, National Education, and National Economy. Most importantly, as historian Simon Schama states: "[i]ts central aim was to change the nature of the Dutch state and to bind its new institutions into the framework of an electoral democracy." As such it had an importance that outlasted the Batavian Republic and set up an ideal to emulate for its successor states.

=== Uitvoerend Bewind ===
Giddy with their success, the radicals now pushed further. Their legitimacy was already tenuous, because of the way they had seized power. Now they also lost support in the rump-Assembly because of their partisanship. Not wishing to repeat the mistakes of the French Jacobins they moved against the popular political clubs that formed their political base, thereby alienating their most enthusiastic supporters. On the other hand, at the behest of Delacroix they also moved against "counter-revolutionaries" by having purging commissions removing these men from the electoral rolls, further undermining the legitimacy of the regime, as moderate Patriots were also disenfranchised. The final blow was that the new regime reneged on its promise to elect an entirely new Representative Assembly.

==== Coup d'état of the moderates ====
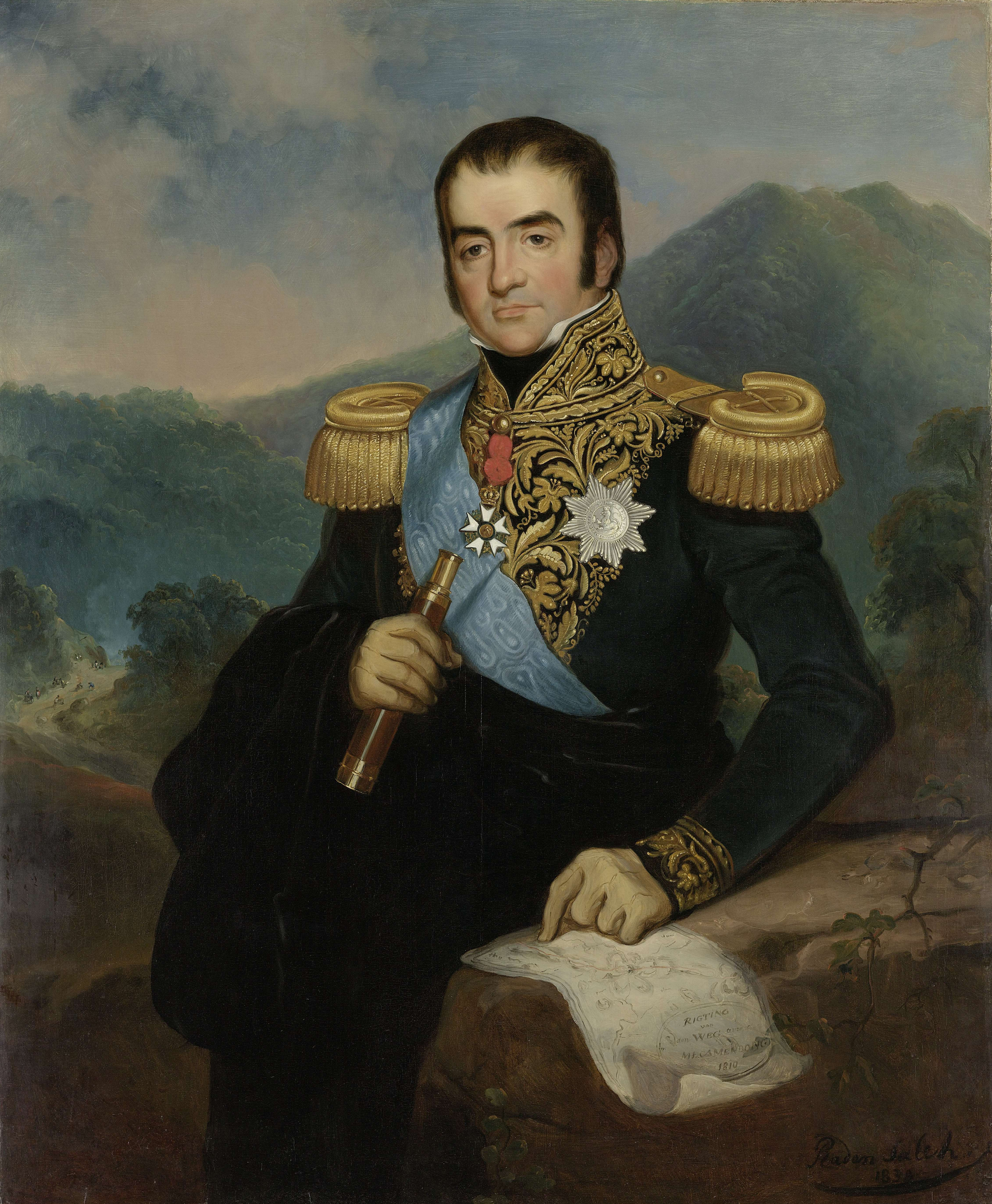
Herman Willem Daendels (1762–1818)

Meanwhile, the 22 Floréal coup in France undermined Delacroix, because it inspired more sympathy by French foreign minister Charles Maurice de Talleyrand-Périgord for the Dutch opposition members who demanded the ambassador's recall. At the same time, Daendels became disaffected with the regime he had helped put into power because of the depredations of the purging commissions. (Note: He also travelled secretly to Paris to obtain permission for the coming coup.) His French colleague General Barthélemy Catherine Joubert was displeased with the radicals because of conflicts about the co-dominion of Flushing. Finally, the newly appointed Agenten were disturbed about the inefficiency of the Uitvoerend Bewind. All these disaffections came together with the coup on 12 June 1798, of that recidivist, General Daendels, in which he disturbed a dinner party of Delacroix and three members of the Uitvoerend Bewind, violating the diplomatic immunity of the ambassador by putting pistols to his chest. The members of the Representative Assembly were arrested in session. (Note: Vreede and Fijnje temporarily evaded arrest by jumping from a window, but their colleague Stefanus Jacobus van Langen was badly roughed up by the putschists.)

The fall of the Vreede-Fijnje Bewind opened the way for the actual implementation of the new constitution. The "Interim Directory" that now came to power (consisting of a few of the dissenting Agenten) made haste with organising elections for the Representative Assembly that convened on 31 July. By the middle of August a new Uitvoerend Bewind had been appointed and the Agenten who had been behind the coup, resumed their original positions. This new regime now started to implement the policies that their radical predecessors had written into the constitution. The coup of June therefore was not a reactionary revolution, but only brought about a change in personnel. Soon most of the people that were arrested at both the January and June coups were released in the spirit of reconciliation that the new regime advocated. The make-up of the Representative Assembly closely resembled that of the second National Assembly of 1797.

Departments of the Batavian Republic

The new regime was soon to discover that changes do not easily come about by legislative fiat. The part of the constitution that worked adequately was the experiment with indirect democracy. During the period in which the constitution was in force, the system of primary assemblies that elected delegates who voted for the respective organs of government worked efficiently, and kept the voters engaged. However, exactly because the Republic was a genuine democracy, other goals of the regime were less easy to attain. The elections often put people into office that were very much opposed to the unitary state that was now enshrined in the constitution, and to other innovations that it entailed, or in any case were of a conservative inclination.

This already applied at the top: the constitution contained an age-requirement for the members of the Uitvoerend Bewind, which favoured the election of staid Patriot regents, and discriminated against the more talented appointed Agents, like Jacobus Spoors, Gerrit Jan Pijman, and Alexander Gogel. The tenor of the Bewind became more conservative in the ensuing years. The agents went to work energetically, however, and started with an onslaught on the old administrative organisation of the country, in a deliberate attempt to liquidate the very identity of the old federal structure. The once mighty province of Holland was carved into three pieces: Amstel (Amsterdam and immediate vicinity), Texel (the northern peninsula) and Delf (the southern part); and the other provinces were often merged in larger entities, like Overijssel and Drente into Ouden Yssel, and Frisia and Groningen into the Eems department. The aim was to organise the country into units with equal numbers of primary assemblies (hence the small Amstel department with its large population). The first elections for the administrative organs of these new entities were held in March 1799. But, of course, such a reorganisation did not suddenly change the old allegiances of the people living in these areas. In any case, the new local and departmental administrations, though elected, were supposed to execute the policies as centrally laid down by the national government. As the elections often put people in power who represented the old order (like Joan Arend de Vos van Steenwijk in Ouden Yssel) this was exceedingly unlikely. To put it differently, the political effort to attain "national unity" through reconciliation of the diverse Patriot factions of all stripes, got in the way of the effort to create an efficient national unitary state, as envisioned by Gogel.

==== Public finance reform ====
The unitary state was not an end in itself, but a means to higher ends. The republic had been in dire financial straits even before the revolution of 1795. The system of public finance that had been the envy of the world in its Golden Age, (Note: For instance, it took only three days for a consortium of Amsterdam bankers in 1688 to bring together the loan that financed the invasion of England by the Republic's forces, that later became known as the Glorious Revolution.) enabling it to throw far beyond its weight in world politics up to the Peace of Utrecht in 1713, had become a millstone around its neck. By 1713 the public debt of the County of Holland had reached 310 million guilders; the debt of the Generality was 68 million; and the debts of the smaller provinces, and of the cities came on top of this. The debt service of Holland alone in that year required 14 million guilders, which exceeded its regular tax revenue. Most of this humongous public debt was held by Dutch private citizens, so in a sense it merely engendered an internal money circuit in the Dutch economy. However, it was mostly concentrated in the hands of the rentier class, while the debt was serviced by mainly regressive taxes that weighed on the working population. Most importantly, these were taxes levied by the individual provinces, who serviced their own debt, and paid into the Generality coffers according to a repartition schedule last changed in 1616. Attempts to reform this structure during the 18th century were mainly fruitless.

To ameliorate the situation the old Republic maintained a policy of severe austerity during the century, especially economising on its defence outlays (which in large part explains why its military and political role declined so much). Up to the Fourth Anglo-Dutch War this policy succeeded in bringing down the level of debt, but this war brought a large uptick in the public debt: between 1780 and 1794 the province of Holland alone issued 120 million guilders of new bonds. In 1795, its total debt stood at 455 million guilders. To this should be added the debts of the Dutch East India Company (VOC) and its sister, the Dutch West India Company (WIC), and the five Dutch Admiralties for a total of about 150 million guilders. The other provinces owed 155 million guilders. The grand total in 1795, at the beginning of the Batavian Republic, came to 760 million guilders; (Note: To provide some perspective to this: in 1791 Alexander Hamilton estimated the total U.S. public debt at US$76 million. About US$10 million of this was foreign debt, which he proceeded to refinance with a Dutch loan of approximately 20 million guilders.) this imposed a debt service of 25 million guilders annually. The indemnity of the Treaty of The Hague immediately added 100 million guilders to this total, and the maintenance of the French army of occupation added about 12 million annually (while the other funding requirements of the republic added another 20 million annually). To fulfill its engagements to the French Republic, Pieter Stadnitski joined a committee at the end of July 1795. On 3 August, it was announced that from that date French soldiers would be paid in sound Dutch currency and no one could be obliged to accept French assignats anymore. In 1814 the public debt stood at 1.7 billion guilders.

The average ordinary revenue of the republic at this time amounted to between 28 and 35 million guilders. However, since the outbreak of the war in 1793 the expenditure had been running at between 40 and 55 millions. For the year 1800 the republic had to find 78 million guilders for its expenditures. In other words, the new Agent of Finance, Gogel, was faced with a financial emergency. He needed to generate about 50 million guilders annually in ordinary revenue on a permanent basis urgently. Besides, as the Dutch tax system was heavily skewed toward highly regressive indirect taxes, which inordinately burdened the impoverished population, he wanted to change this to a system that depended more on direct (income and wealth) taxes. Finally, he wanted to do away with the provincial differentiation in the taxation, and construct a nationally standardised system. When he put these reform proposals to the Representative Assembly on 30 September 1799, they met with massive resistance. This led to so much delay in its acceptance that by the time it was to be implemented (in 1801) the re-federalisation of the state by the new Staatsbewind regime was already underway. Eventually, Gogel's reforms were only implemented under the successor state of the Kingdom of Holland.

These are (important) examples of instances in which the good intentions of the Uitvoerend Bewind and its Agenten met with the political and economic realities of the times. Other necessary reforms (the abolition of the guilds, the reform of the system of poor relief to mention but a few examples) equally came to nothing. These defeats progressively led to disenchantment of the population with the regime, that already was in an awkward position because it was also brushed with the tar of the depredations of the French "sister republic" that mainly viewed the Batavian Republic as a milk cow, both collectively (in its demands for loans at very low interest rates) and individually (in the demands of French officials for bribes and other extortions).

==== Anglo-Russian invasion ====
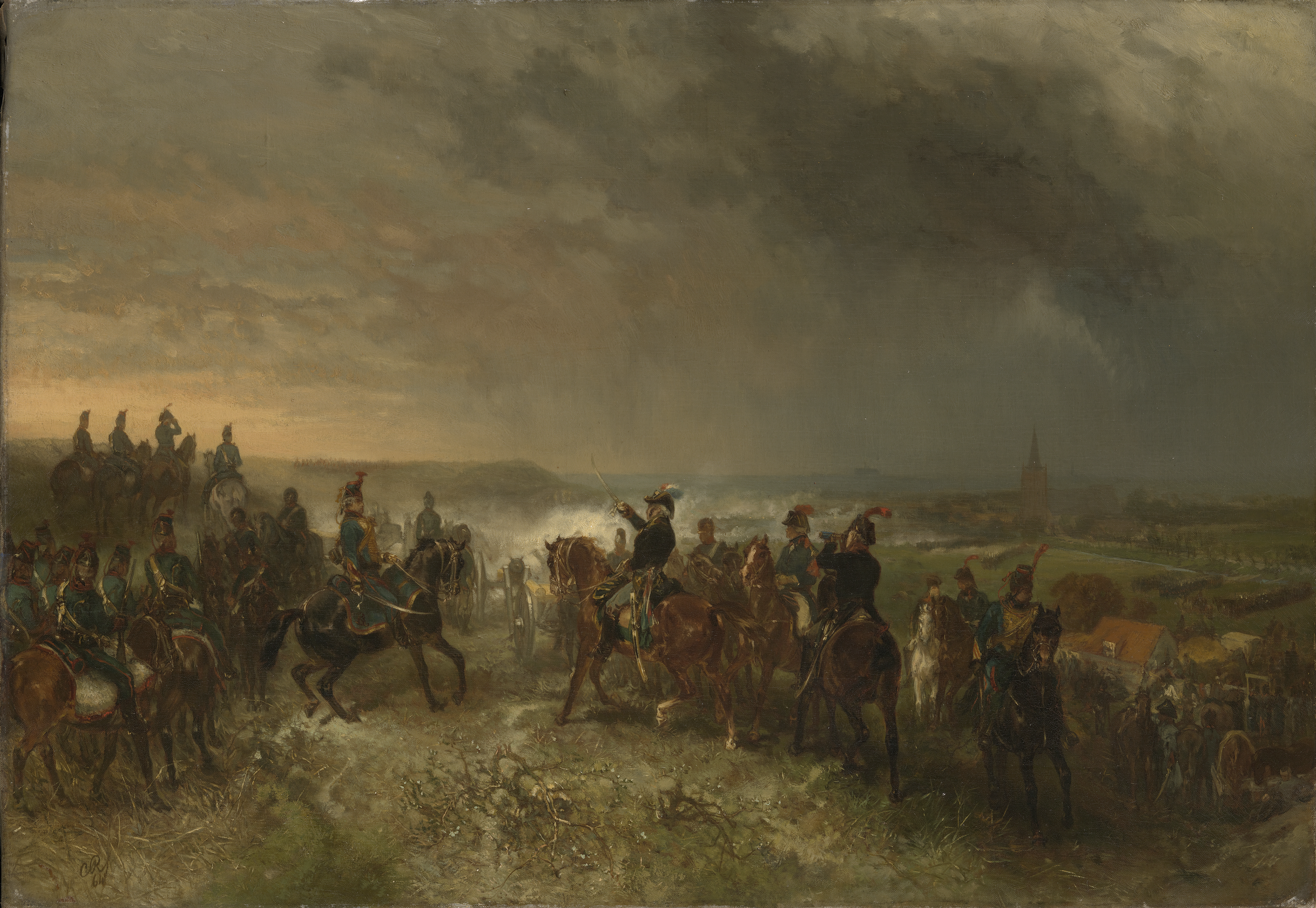
The Battle of Castricum, in which a Franco-Batavian army defeated the Anglo-Russian forces and ended the invasion.

The sagging popularity of the Republic did not escape the attention of the British intelligence services. However, because this intelligence was filtered through the eyes of Orangist agents in the Republic and émigrés in England, it was erroneously interpreted as possible support for an Orangist restoration. This caused the miscalculation that led to the ill-fated Anglo-Russian invasion of Holland in the peninsula of North Holland in 1799.

Though the expedition ended in failure the members of the Uitvoerend Bewind became very nervous in the days before the Battle of Bergen (1799). The Agent for Foreign Affairs, Van der Goes who had been in favour of distancing the Republic from the French, chose this inopportune moment to secretly approach the King of Prussia as a mediator, with a scheme in which the Hereditary Prince was to become a kind of constitutional monarch in a constitution on the model of the American Constitution. The Republic would revert to its traditional neutrality, while Britain would occupy North Holland, and France Zeeland. The overture was rejected, and it caused a lot of embarrassment in the relations with the French Directory. (Note: The French demanded the expulsion from office of the "culprits".) At this time Napoleon Bonaparte performed his coup of 18 Brumaire, establishing the French Consulate. The Franco-Batavian relations now entered a whole new era.

=== Staatsbewind and the Peace of Amiens ===
==== Pressure for constitutional reform ====
Though Napoleon had a warlike reputation, his policies in his first years as First Consul were aimed at restoring peace in Europe, albeit at terms favourable to France. The animus of the members of the Second Coalition was mostly against the French Revolution, its ideas and its consequences. By this time Napoleon himself was convinced of their perfidy. Talleyrand and Napoleon therefore saw a possibility of a compromise, in which France would retain its chain of docile client states, but with the "revolutionary" sting removed, to appease the Allies. That unrevolutionary docility was to be assured by constitutions designed to eliminate not only domestic conflict (as was the new French political order), but also any flashes of impertinent nationalism. France therefore embarked on a program of constitutional reform in the dependent republics, first in the Helvetic Republic, where Napoleon as Mediator imposed the Constitution of Malmaison in 1801 (followed by the Second Helvetic Constitution a year later), restoring the old confederal order.

A similar "solution" seemed appropriate for the Batavian Republic. The Batavian government, and its constitution, were particularly disliked by the Consul (no friend of democracy in any case), because of the snub that Amsterdam bankers gave in 1800 to his request for a big loan at the usual generous rate of interest the French expected as a matter of right. He blamed the Uitvoerend Bewind for this, and many other foibles, like undermining the boycott of British goods. To remedy these ills, a new Batavian constitution on the political principles of the Consulate (union, authority, political office for men of ability and social station) was needed. The new French ambassador Charles Louis Huguet, marquis de Sémonville he sent to The Hague in 1799 was just the man for this job.

Meanwhile, even the minds of reformers like Gogel had become receptive to the need for change. The frustrations of the stalemate between unitarist reformers and democratically elected federalist obstructionists had caused a certain disillusionment with democratic politics in the former (the latter were already convinced). An alliance was therefore forming between the would-be reformers, who would like to finally push their reforms through, by "Bonapartist" means, if necessary, and the people who wished to restore the old federal order, in the hands of the old regent class. Director Besier in particular was amenable to a project that would extend executive power (and curtail that of the Assembly), and revert the constitution to federal devolution. With the help of Sémonville he now started to push a project of constitutional reform that followed the French Constitution of the Year VIII in important respects: a bicameral legislature would be appointed by a "National College" (akin to the French Sénat conservateur) from a list of names produced by a convoluted system of national elections. This met with little enthusiasm by two of the other Directors François Ermerins and Jean Henri van Swinden, and by the Representative Assembly, that rejected the project on 11 June 1801, by fifty votes to twelve.

==== Augereau-coup ====
The majority in the Uitvoerend Bewind (Gerrit Jan Pijman in particular) therefore amended the project in a sense that gave re-federalisation even more emphasis. They unilaterally convened the primary assemblies by a proclamation on 14 September 1801, have a referendum on this new draft constitution. The Assembly defiantly ruled this proclamation illegal on 18 September. Then General Augereau (of the 1797 Fructidor-coup), now commander-in-chief of the French forces in the Netherlands, routinely closed the doors of the Assembly (by previous arrangement with Pijman) on 19 September, and arrested the dissident Directors. Despite this military putsch the campaign for the plebiscite took place in an atmosphere of political freedom unthinkable in France. Nevertheless, this did not result in great enthusiasm for the new constitution. When the votes were counted on 1 October, out of 416,619 voters only 16,771 voted in favour and 52,219 against. The Directors then used a sleight of hand that unfortunately would also become familiar in the Dutch constitutional politics of the successor states: they counted the 350,000 abstentions as "tacit affirmations".

Unlike the previous coup of the Augereau, this coup did present a sharp break with the recent past. The new constitution reduced the role of the legislative branch (which now did not have the right of initiative), and expanded the powers of the Executive, which now became known as the Staatsbewind (Regency of State). The elective principle was reduced to a formality: the Staatsbewind, originally consisting of the three directors taking part in the coup, expanded its membership by co-optation to twelve. This executive then appointed the first 35 members of the legislature. As vacancies arose, these were filled, as far as possible, on a provincial rota and according to national quotas of representatives of each province (much like the old States-General). Except for Holland, the old provinces were reconstituted. The local and provincial administrative organs continued to be elected – no longer by universal manhood suffrage, but by a system of census suffrage. (Note: The qualification for standing for office was 200 guilders in annual city taxes or 300 guilders in house rent; 10,000 guilders of real estate or 20,000 guilders worth of securities.)

Most important was the change in personnel of these organs, mostly as a consequence of this electoral change. The "democrats" were mostly replaced by Patriot regents, who had no patience with democracy, and by the old Orangist regents, who did not even have to disguise their allegiance as in early 1801 a convenient amnesty was proclaimed. One surprising example is Egbert Sjuck Gerrold Juckema van Burmania Rengers, the Orangist burgomaster of Leeuwarden before 1795, a notorious reactionary.

The coup represented a counter-revolution. This became clear in the way the iconography of the 1795 revolution disappeared: the epigraph Vrijheid, Gelijkheid, Broederschap ('Liberty, Equality, Fraternity') which had adorned all official publications, was henceforth removed, and the last Liberty Trees were removed from the town squares. Soon the old ways were restored. For example, though the abolition of the guilds formally remained, in practice regulation of crafts and trades was reimposed by local ordinances.

==== Peace negotiations ====
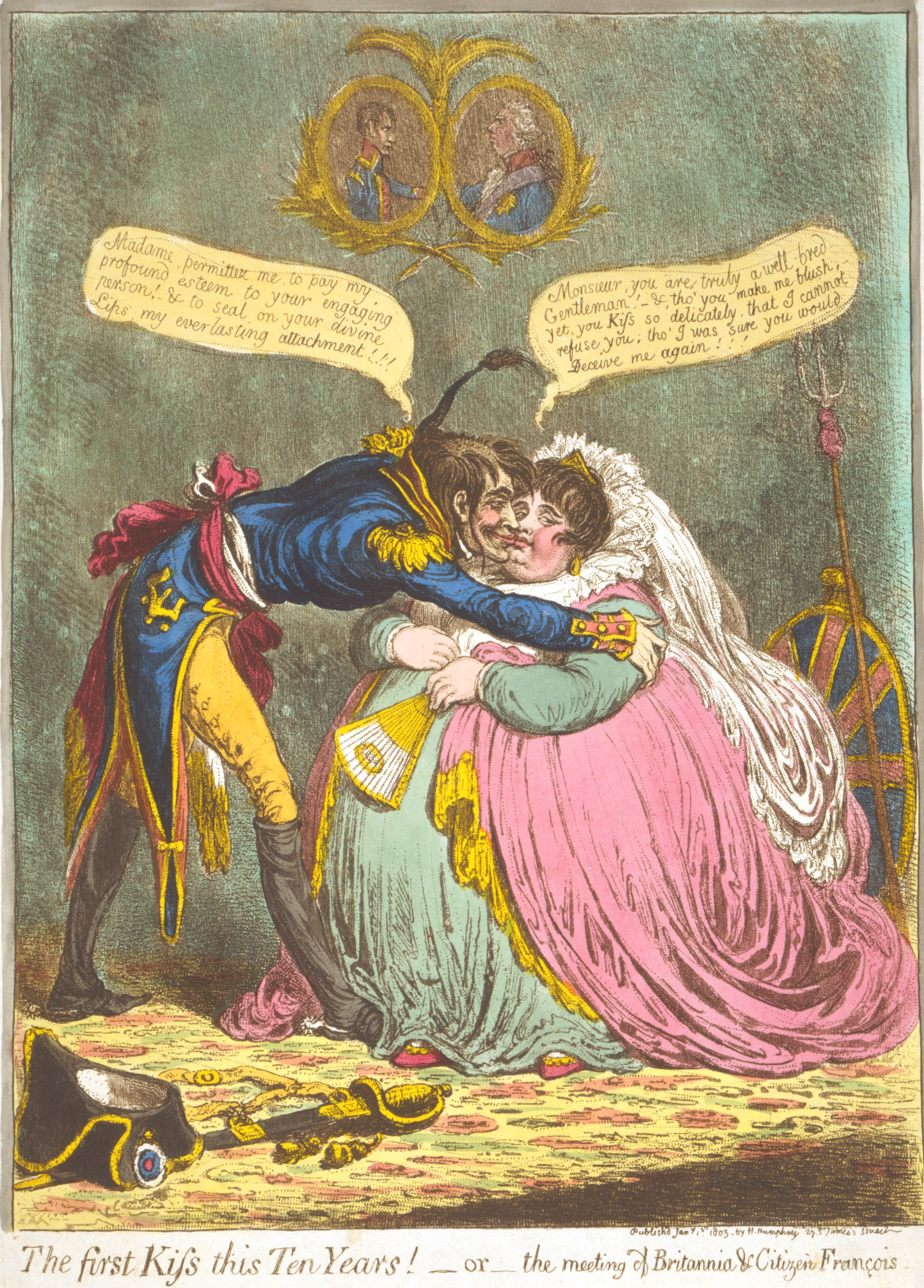
In The first Kiss this Ten Years! —or—the meeting of Britannia & Citizen François (1803), James Gillray caricatured the peace between France and Britain.

Against this background the negotiations for the Treaty of Amiens started in October 1801. The minor participants in the negotiations between Great Britain and France (the Batavian Republic and Spain) were immediately presented with faits accomplis: the preliminary agreement ceded Ceylon (now Sri Lanka), and guaranteed free British shipping to the Cape of Good Hope, without the Dutch even being consulted. The Dutch ambassador in France, Rutger Jan Schimmelpenninck, who acted as the Dutch plenipotentiary, vainly protested that the Treaty of The Hague had guaranteed the Dutch colonies, and that France had promised not to make a separate peace. After this separate peace had been concluded, the British were left to negotiate with the minor French allies separately. This did not mean that the Dutch were completely left to their own devices: whenever French interests seemed to be in danger, France decisively intervened on its own behalf, as in the attempt to deduct the value of the Dutch fleet, surrendered in 1799, that the British had purchased from the Stadtholder, from the indemnification of the Prince of Orange.

That indemnification was an important sideshow in the negotiations. The consequence of the peace treaty was that the Batavian Republic now received international recognition, even by the British, and that the old Dutch Republic was now irreversibly dead. This put an end to all pretensions of the Stadtholder and his heirs, such as they were. It may be important to note that these pretensions were dubious to begin with. The Stadtholder was never the sovereign power in the Netherlands, despite understandable misconceptions by foreigners, who may have thought that a country needed a head of state, and the Stadtholder was it. Instead he was an officeholder, appointed by the provincial States, who also was captain-general and admiral-general of the Union (there was originally no Stadtholder on the confederal level).

In the Orangist revolution of 1747 this office had been revamped to "Stadhouder-generaal" and made hereditary, and after the Prussian intervention of 1787 the powers of the Stadtholder had become dictatorial. But formally the States General had been sovereign since 1588, and the Stadtholder was merely their "first servant". The British may have entertained certain fantasies about his formal status, but never seriously considered it. An example of this would the British acceptance of the surrender of the Batavian fleet in the name of the Stadtholder in 1799, as though he was a sovereign prince. But this was all make-believe, and it ended with the peace of 1802 (though it was revived in 1813).

The Prince had reason to feel aggrieved by this. He did have large patrimonial estates in the Netherlands that now were forfeit. Besides, the loss of his hereditary offices entailed a loss of income. According to his own calculations the arrears in all these incomes since 1795 amounted to 4 million guilders. The Staatsbewind refused to pay this, or any sum, point blank, and the peace treaty specifically exempted the Dutch from paying anything. Instead, an arrangement between the French, British and Prussians (the former Stadtholder's champions (Note: The Prussian king was the Stadtholder's brother-in-law and his sister continually pleaded with her brother on her husband's behalf.)) in the matter was reached that in return for dropping any and all claims William was to be compensated with the abbatial domains of Fulda and Corvey Abbey (see also Principality of Nassau-Orange-Fulda).

==== Short interlude of peace ====
The Treaty restored most of the colonies that had been captured by the British since 1795, except Ceylon, but including the Cape Colony. This now made the attempts in the Asiatic Council, which had replaced the Directorate of the VOC in 1799, to reform the management of the colonies, more urgent. Dirk van Hogendorp was commissioned to write a proposal, that met with considerable enthusiasm from the more progressive elements on the council, like Samuel Iperusz. Wiselius and J.H.Neethling. He proposed to abolish all perquisites and sinecures; to permit private trade; to permit native subjects to own private property; to substitute the "land levies" by a regulated land tax; and the abolition of all seigneurial rights in the colonies. This met with overwhelming resistance from vested interests. When a new Charter for the colonies was promulgated, Hogendorp's proposals had been whittled down to insignificance. The vestigial democrats on the Council were now purged in favour of Orangist reactionaries like Hendrik Mollerus, and Hendrik van Stralen. In any case, the Republic did not enjoy the possession of its colonies for long. After the resumption of hostilities in 1803 the returned colonies in most cases were soon recaptured by the British. Java, however, remained Dutch until 1811.

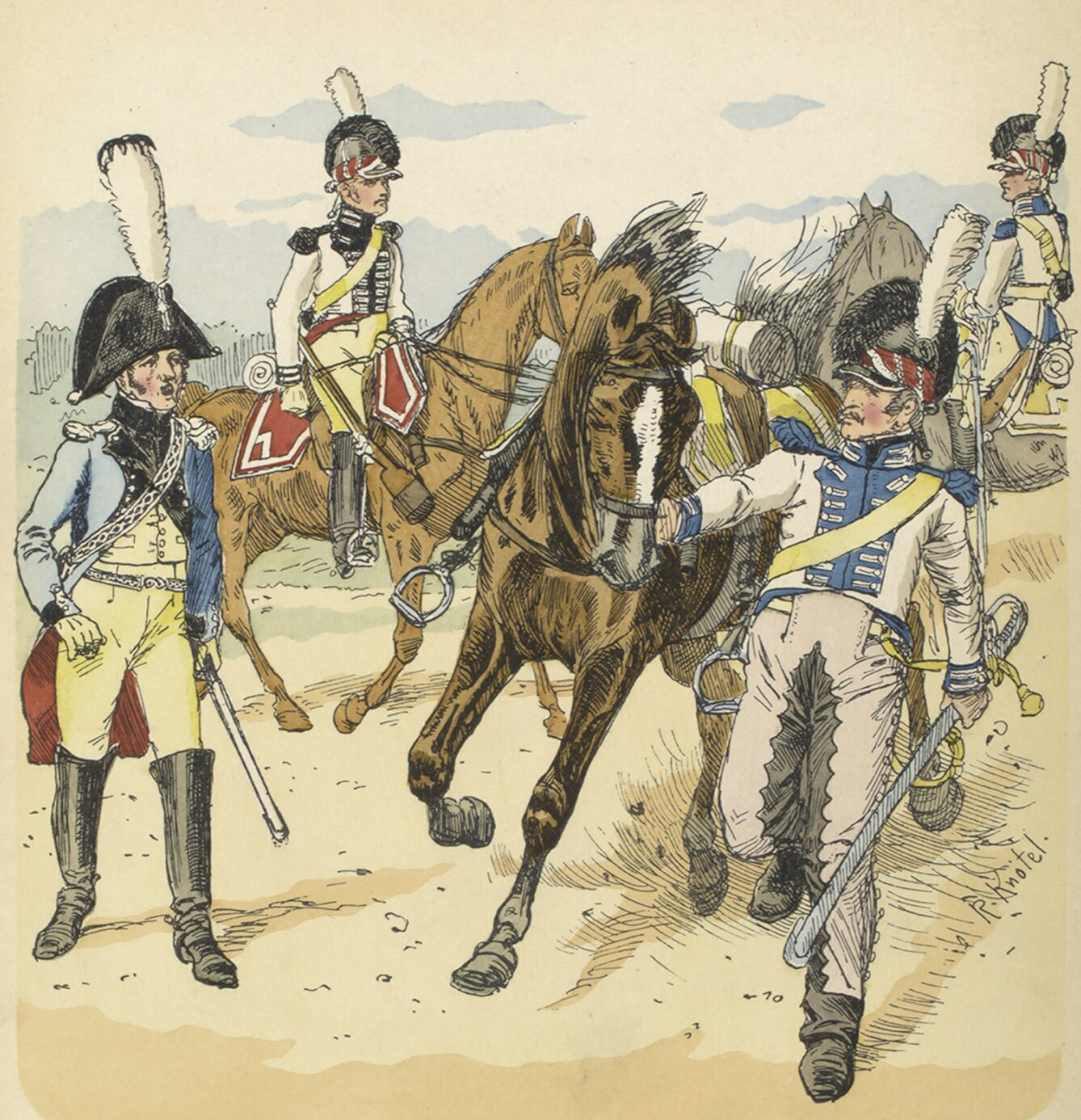
1st Batavian Light Dragoons

Another potentially important consequence of the peace might have been that a number of provisions of the Treaty of The Hague, that had been conditional on a peace, like the reduction of the French army of occupation, would now have become operational. However, the First Consul proved reluctant to reduce the numbers of French troops, or return the port of Flushing, for the good of the Dutch as he pointed out, as they needed many of their own troops in their restored colonies, so the "protection" of the French troops was considered necessary. On the other hand, the departure of the French troops was an indispensable point for the British as they could not allow the Netherlands to be dominated by a hostile power, and the Batavian Republic was incapable of defending its own neutrality. This was to be an insoluble dilemma in the coming years.

Real advantages of the peace came in the economic field. As an open economy, the Republic needed unhindered trade. It was heavily dependent on exports of agricultural products to the British markets, and on its services sector (especially its large merchant fleet, and the banking sector), whereas its industry (whatever remained of it after a century of being confronted by foreign protectionism) also was dependent on exports. All these sectors had suffered enormously from the war: the British blockade and French and British privateering had almost brought marine trade to a standstill, whereas a commercial treaty with France (which would have ended French discrimination of Dutch trade in industrial goods) proved an ever-receding fata morgana. True, much of the trade had shifted to flags of convenience (especially that of the US and European neutrals like Prussia), but the peace made the resurgence of the Dutch carrying trade fully practicable. Nevertheless, some changes proved irreversible, like the shift of trade patterns to German ports, and the decline of the fisheries.

==== Invasion preparations and economic warfare ====
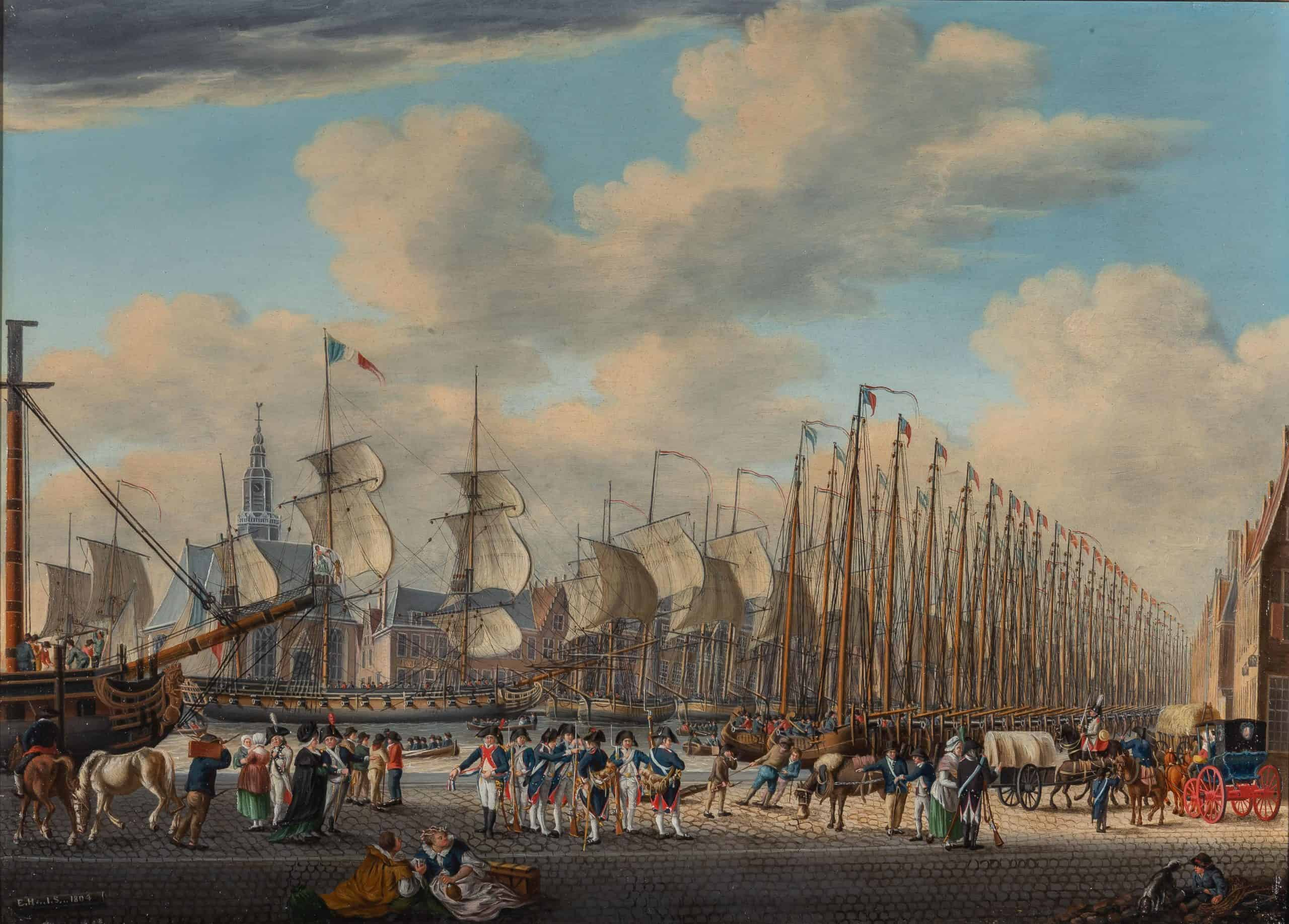
The Batavian fleet in Vlissingen, 1804

The peace turned out to be of short duration. On 18 May 1803, slightly more than a year after the peace, war resumed. Napoleon was now intent on the destruction of Great Britain by culminating in an ambitious planned invasion. The French expected the Batavian Republic to play a major supporting role in this. As the Franco-Batavian alliance's embodiment, the Staatsbewind was forced to assent to a Convention bringing the total of French and Batavian forces in the Netherlands to 35,000. In addition, 9,000 Batavian troops were slated for the proposed overseas expedition. Even more importantly, the Dutch were to supply five ships-of-the-line, five frigates, 100 gunboats, and 250 flat-bottomed transport craft, capable of holding 60–80 men by December 1803. In total the Dutch were meant to provide transport for 25,000 men and 2,500 horses, the major part of Napoleon's invasion armada, and all at Dutch expense. Napoleon's imposed real burdens on the finances of the Republic and on its economy.

Another real burden was the economic warfare that Napoleon launched against the British, which was answered by a British counter-boycott. This foreshadowed the Continental System which was written into law in 1806. However already in 1803 it started to choke off Dutch trade. Ostensibly, the Staatsbewind did its part by prohibiting the import of all goods from the enemy on 5 July 1803. Later it banned cheese exports and butter. These measures were of little practical effect, since in 1804 the volume of general exports to Britain was nearly equal to that in the last year of peace in 1802. British goods reached Dutch destinations via neutral German ports or disguised as cargo from other countries. The republic was therefore an important "keyhole into Europe" that undermined the French economic sanctions against Britain. Since the members of the Staatsbewind, and their friends, often profited from this clandestine trade directly, the patience of the French was wearing thin. (Note: In the old Republic trading with the enemy had been looked upon as a necessary evil. The Admiralties had been partially financed with so-called licenten, license fees for allowing such trade.) Matters came to a head when the French commander in the Republic, Auguste de Marmont, ordered in November 1804 that French naval patrols and customs officials were to take over the responsibility for the surveillance of cargoes in Dutch ports, with powers of confiscation without reference to Dutch authorities. The Staatsbewind forbade any Batavian official to take orders from the French on 23 November 1804.

=== Grand Pensionary and end of the Republic ===
This act of defiance sealed the fate of yet another of the Batavian regimes. Napoleon had long been dissatisfied with what he viewed as the foot-dragging and inefficiency of the Dutch. As a matter of fact, since the Spring of 1804 informal talks, mediated by Talleyrand, had been under way with the Batavian envoy in Paris, Rutger Jan Schimmelpenninck, who had a good personal rapport with Napoleon (by now emperor). Schimmelpenninck was a power in the Batavian Republic by himself. He had played an important role as the leader of the federalist opposition in the "revolutionary" States-General of 1795, and the first Assembly. Though an opponent of the radicals, he had politically survived the coups of 1798, and served as ambassador to France, and as plenipotentiary to the Amiens negotiations. Now Napoleon saw him as the person to clean the Augean stables of the Dutch client state.

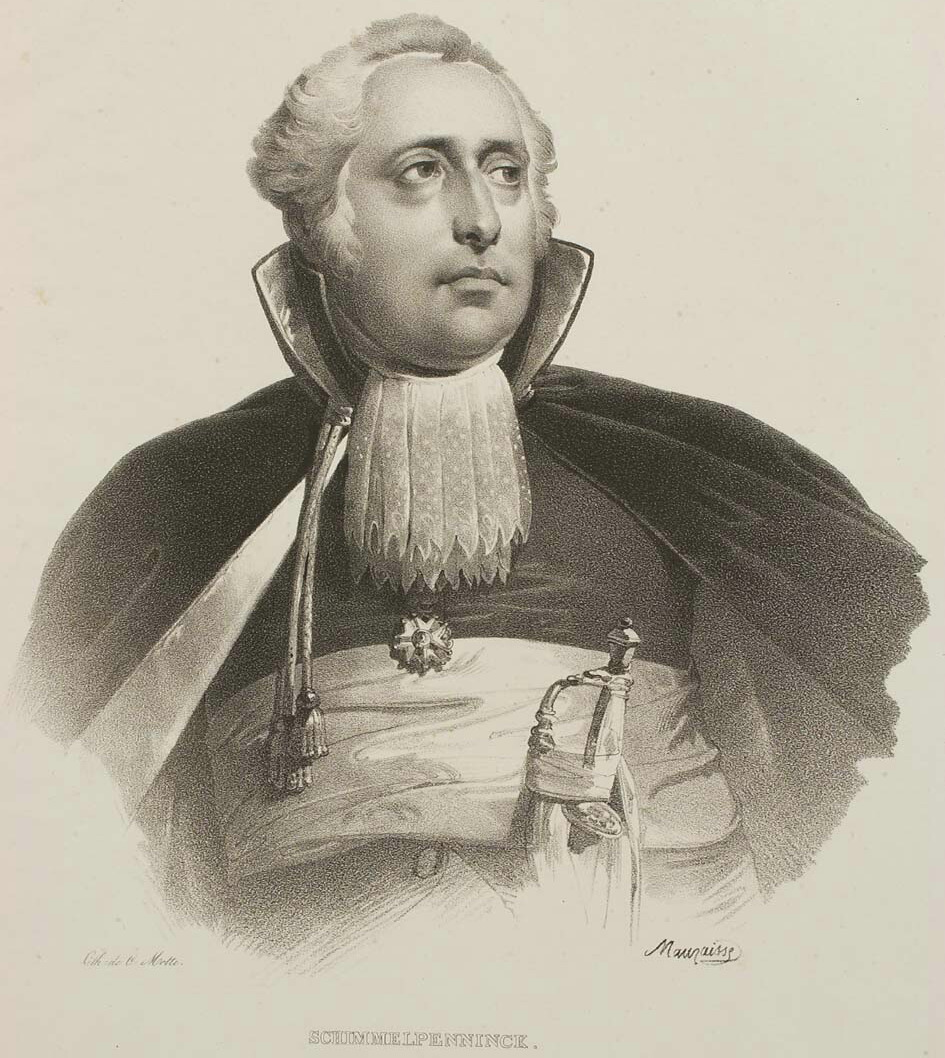
Rutger Jan Schimmelpenninck as Grand Pensionary

Schimmelpenninck saw himself in the same light. He had long had a woolly vision of a "national conciliation" in the Netherlands, that made him amenable to a rapprochement with conservative and Orangist circles. These were to become his power base. Though Schimmelpenninck was a convinced federalist, he was a pliable character also. When Napoleon indicated that he preferred a centralised organisation of the Dutch state (as the re-federalised model of the Staatsbewind had clearly not worked out), he did not hesitate to implement this in his project of a new constitution, that he constructed in the Summer of 1804 in consultation with the Staatsbewind. As a matter of fact, a delegation of the Staatsbewind, consisting of Schimmelpenninck, and members of the Regency van der Goes (the former agent) and Van Haersolte (a former director), presented the case for this draft to Napoleon in November 1804. When the clash about the French customs men therefore took place later in the month, Napoleon came to a speedy decision and soon thereafter the Batavian Republic had a new constitution and government.

On 10 May 1805, Schimmelpenninck was therefore inaugurated as Raadpensionaris (Grand Pensionary) of the Batavian Republic. This venerable title (clearly chosen for sentimental reasons) had little connection with the former office of the States of Holland; as a matter of fact, the new office more resembled that of Stadtholder, though even William V, after 1787, had not possessed the powers Schimmelpenninck was to wield. His was a one-man Executive that would in no way be encumbered by the 19 man Legislative Corps, that had no powers apart from the Pensionary. The Pensionary conducted his business assisted by a Staatsraad, that resembled the French Conseil d'État more than the old Raad van State, and by Secretaries of State, who resembled the Agenten of the Uitvoerend Bewind. Of course, such an important change in the constitution had to receive the imprimatur of the popular will. A plebiscite was duly organised which elicited 14,903 Yes-votes (against 136 Noes) from an electorate of 353,322. The abstentions were counted as "tacit affirmatives" in the now well-established tradition. (Note: There was one recorded no-vote in Groningen.)

Despite such unpromisingly reactionary trappings, the Schimmelpenninck regime accomplished more in its short existence than the previous regimes had in the ten years since 1795. This was mainly due to the preparatory work by agents like Gogel; Johannes Goldberg, for National Economy; and Johannes van der Palm, for National Education.

Gogel's General Taxation Plan was finally enacted in June 1805; a first government-approved attempt at unification of the Dutch spelling was made; an embryonic Department of Agriculture and Department of Hydraulics were formed, to foreshadow the later government departments; even a Pharmacopeia Batavia started the regulation of drugs; and the School Law of 1806 organised a national system of public elementary education. Most importantly perhaps, the local-government law of July 1805 founded the first Dutch system of public administration.

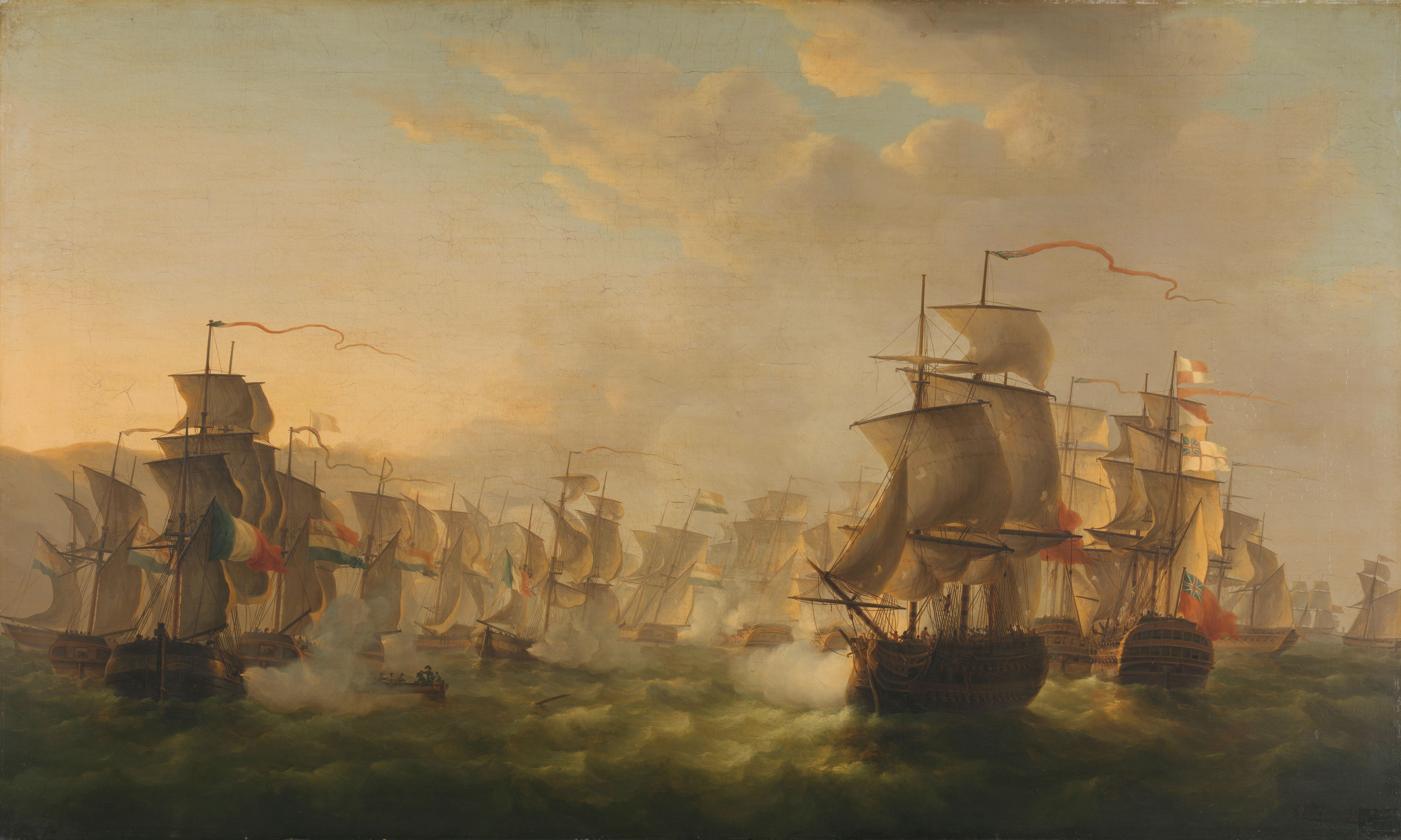
The Battle of Blanc-Nez and Gris-Nez, in which Carel Hendrik Ver Huell repelled a larger British force and brought the Batavian flotilla to Boulogne.

The French reaction to this flurry of reforms was mixed, however. The very zeal of the program might betoken a renascent nationalism that could work against French interests. The planned invasion of England was cancelled due to a lack of naval superiority, which was only reinforced by the debacle of the Battle of Trafalgar. The Dutch now began to clamour for economies in the form of the return of the Boulogne flotilla, which annoyed Napoleon, because he still had a use for it. The man who had led that flotilla to Boulogne, after repelling a superior British fleet, Carel Hendrik Ver Huell, was now Secretary for the Navy. He had also become a confidant of the emperor, and now engaged in a secret correspondence with Talleyrand and Napoleon. The latter had just concluded the Peace of Pressburg and was busy dividing up Europe in client-kingdoms apportioned to his relatives. He saw a good candidate for such a position in the Netherlands in his brother Louis Bonaparte.

Ver Huell started scheming with his French patrons behind the back of Schimmelpenninck and feeding negative information about the Pensionary that found its way into the French press. Schimmelpenninck's position was weakened by the fact that he was slowly going blind. The Dutch Secretaries of State and the Staatsraad did not have much choice: their only options were a complete extinguishing of the national identity in the form of annexation to the Empire, or the lesser evil of a new kingdom under one of Napoleon's relatives. A Groot Besogne (Grand Commission) was formed to conduct the unequal negotiations with the Emperor. The latter, however, refused to speak with the Commission, and only communicated to them through the intermediary of Ver Huell. Talleyrand had meanwhile drafted a "Treaty" which contained the conditions under which the crown of "Holland" was to be offered to Louis: no union of the crowns; no conscription; a possible commercial treaty with France; and the basic freedoms of the Netherlands (linguistic, religious, judicial) were to be maintained; while the civil list was fixed at the "modest sum" of 1.5 million guilders. The constitution of the Pensionary was actually to be maintained with a few minor alterations (the title of raadpensionaris changed to that of King; and the size of the Staatsraad and the legislative corps nearly doubled).

The Commission was not allowed to refer back to The Hague. Schimmelpenninck made a last-ditch attempt to have the treaty referred to a plebiscite, but he was ignored. He resigned on 4 June 1806. The next day at the Château de Saint-Cloud, after Napoleon had kept them waiting while he received the Turkish ambassador, the hapless commissioners presented their "petition" to Louis to accept the crown of "Holland", which he graciously did, while Napoleon looked on approvingly.

== Aftermath ==
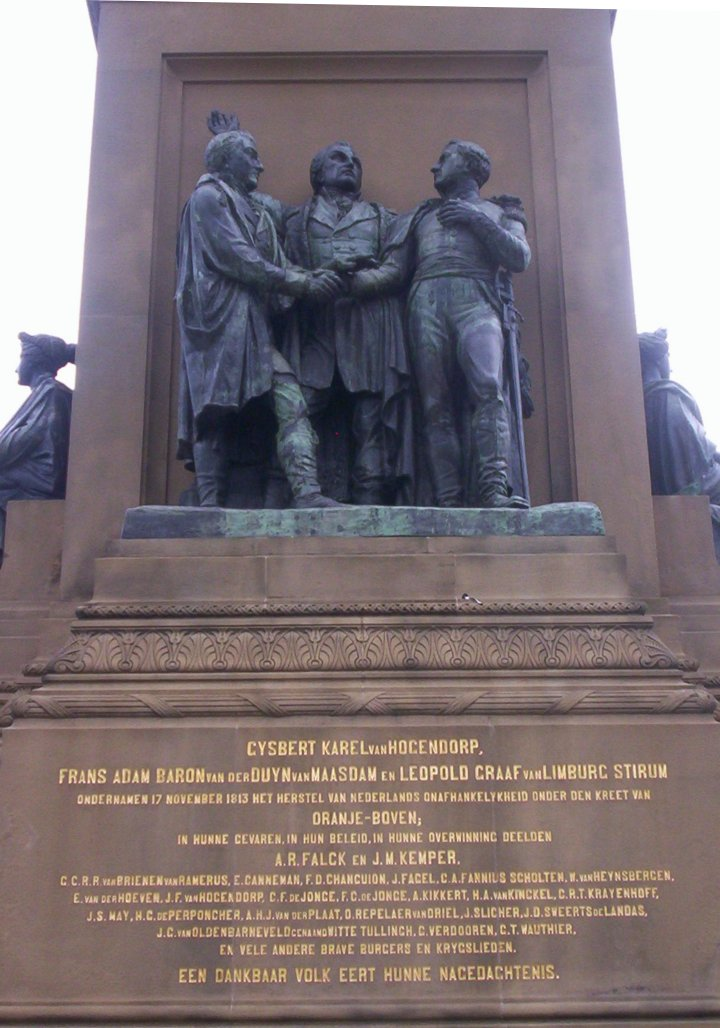
Gijsbert Karel van Hogendorp, Frans Adam van der Duyn van Maasdam, and Leopold van Limburg Stirum, monument at 1813 Square, The Hague

The Kingdom of Holland lasted only four years. Though Louis performed his role beyond all expectations, and did his best to defend the interests of his subjects, for precisely this reason Napoleon decided that the Netherlands could no longer be denied the benefits of reunion with his Empire, over the objections of Louis. Louis abdicated on 2 July 1810, in favour of his son Napoleon Louis Bonaparte, who reigned for ten days, before the kingdom was finally reunited with the origins of the "alluvial deposits of the French rivers", in the words of Napoleon. (Note: By the Rambouillet decree of 9 July 1810.)

This reunion did not outlast the effects of the disastrous French invasion of Russia and subsequent defeat in the Battle of Leipzig. The Empire melted away, and the independent Netherlands took shape again with every city that the retreating French army of occupation evacuated in the course of the War of the Sixth Coalition. In the ensuing political vacuum a triumvirate of former Orangist regents, led by Gijsbert Karel van Hogendorp, invited the former Hereditary Prince (the old Stadtholder had died in 1806) to assume power as "Sovereign Prince". William VI of Orange (later King William I) landed in Scheveningen on 30 November 1813. He duly established control in the Netherlands and was offered the crown of the combined area of the former 17 provinces of the Low Lands (modern Belgium and the Netherlands) by the Allies in the secret London Protocol (also known as the Eight Articles of London) of 21 June 1814, which he accepted exactly one month later. On 16 March 1815, the United Kingdom of the Netherlands was proclaimed and King William I was installed.

=== Historiography note ===
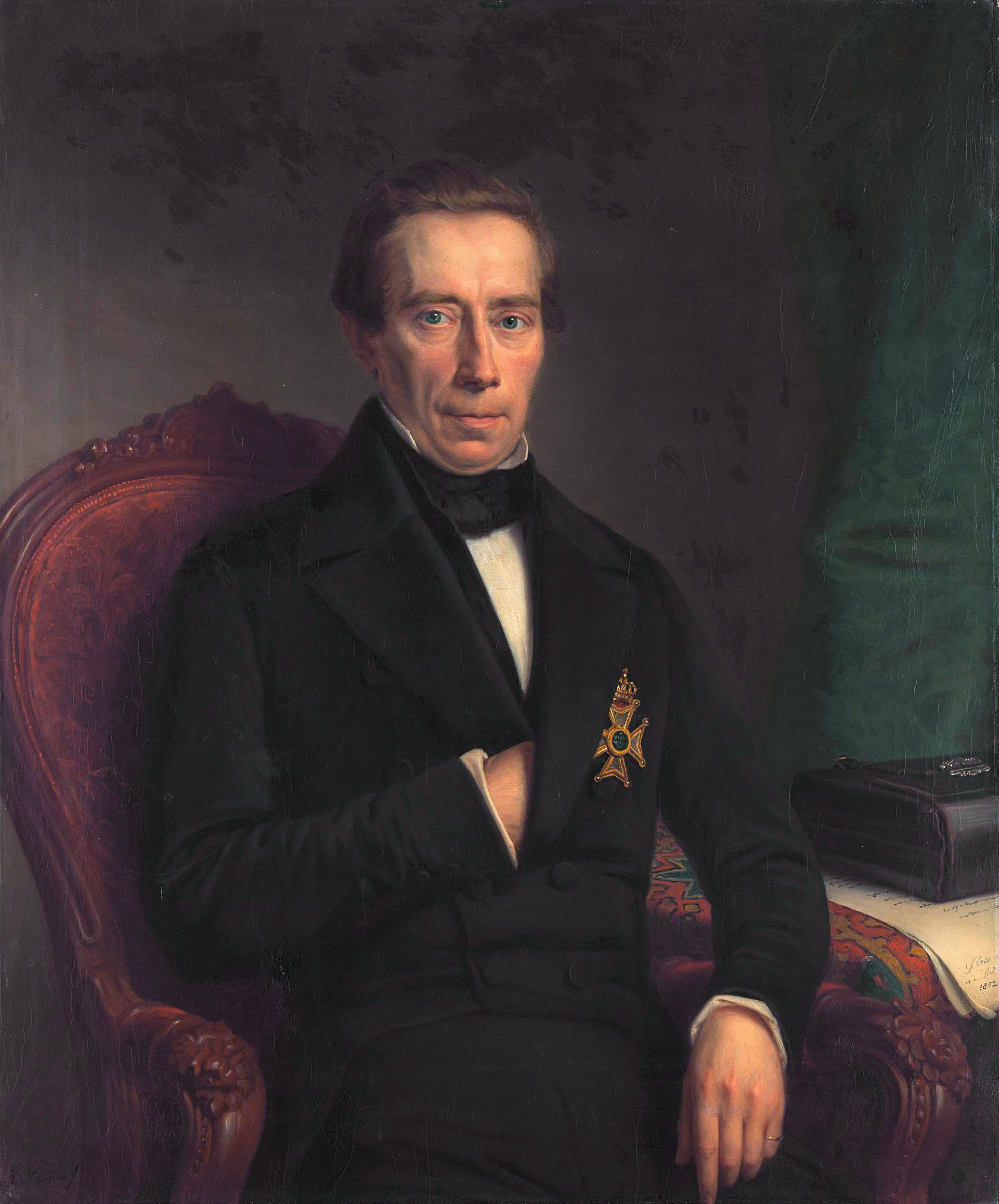
Johan Rudolph Thorbecke

According to the British historian Simon Schama, the Batavian Republic has been controversially treated by historians. After the end of the Nazi occupation of the Netherlands during World War II, some historians (Note: Schama does not name names, but refers for an iconic example to an article in a 1950 issue of the popular Dutch weekly Elseviers Weekblad, in which the Batavians are called "the NSBers of the eighteenth century".) saw a parallel between the Dutch National Socialist Movement (NSB) and the Patriot revolutionaries, while they pictured William V in the heroic role of Queen Wilhelmina and her government-in-exile. However, Dutch historian Pieter Geyl opposed such comparisons in his Patriotten en NSBers: een historische parallel (1946).

Still, by that time the Batavians had already had a bad press in Dutch history writing. This may be explained by the fact that the old ideological struggle between the monarchically-oriented Orangist party and its successive opponents of a more "republican" bent (going back to at least the conflict between Johan van Oldenbarnevelt and Prince Maurice), of which the Patriots were only the latest incarnation, was being refought in the standard works of 19th-century Dutch historians like Guillaume Groen van Prinsterer, who saw plenty to despise in the "popular-sovereignty" philosophy of the Patriot radicals. In his turn Groen was very influential on the way John Lothrop Motley depicted the old Dutch Republic for an American audience.

Motley did not get to deal explicitly with the Batavian Republic, but the way his collaborator William Elliot Griffis dismissed the Patriots speaks for itself: "…whether under the name of the 'Batavian Republic', the Kingdom of Holland, or the provinces of the French empire, the French occupation was virtually a French conquest that had little permanent influence on Dutch history or character."

However most, if not all, characteristics of the current centralised state of the Kingdom of the Netherlands were foreshadowed by the accomplishments of the Batavian Republic, not least the liberal 1848 Constitution. That constitution restored the central tenets of the democratic Staatsregeling of 1798, under the guise of a Constitutional monarchy, as its author Johan Rudolph Thorbecke acknowledged.

== See also ==
- Batavian Revolution in Amsterdam

== Sources ==
- De Vries, J.; Van der Woude, A. (1997). The First Modern Economy. Success, Failure, and Perseverance of the Dutch Economy, 1500–1815. Cambridge University Press. ISBN 978-0-521-57825-7.
- Israel, J. I. (1995). The Dutch Republic: Its Rise, Greatness and Fall, 1477–1806. Oxford University Press. ISBN 0-19-873072-1.
- Riley, James C. (1971). "Pieter Stadnitski And Dutch Investment Banking, 1770-1815". PhD dissertation. p. 103. ProQuest 302541467.
- Schama, S. (1977). Patriots and Liberators. Revolution in the Netherlands 1780–1813. New York: Vintage books. ISBN 0-679-72949-6.
