= Corps of Israelites =

Military unit of the Kingdom of Holland

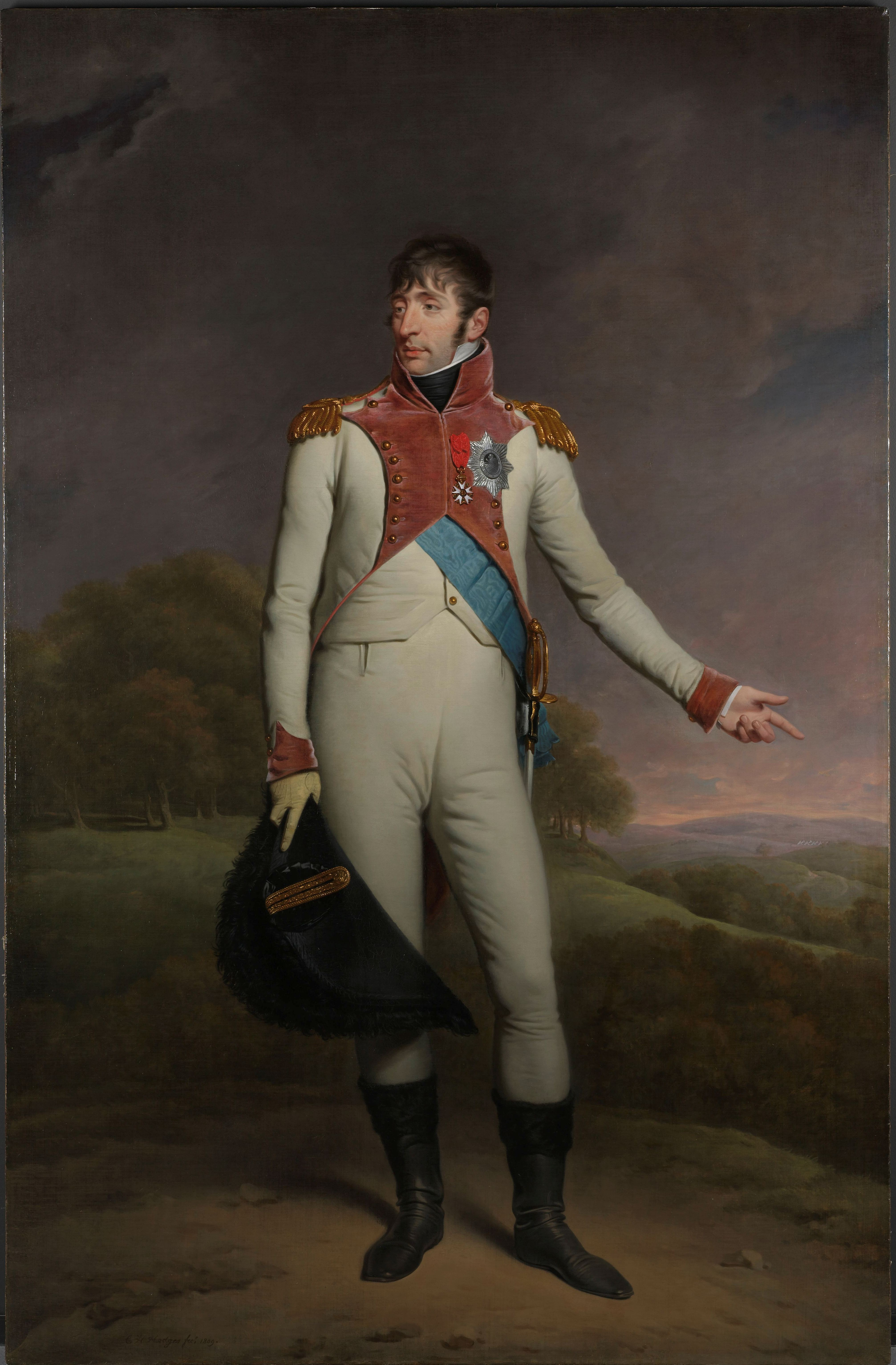
King Louis Bonaparte, a strong supporter of Jewish emancipation, created the unit in 1809

The Corps of Israelites (Dutch: Corps Israëlieten) was a short-lived military unit of the Kingdom of Holland recruited solely from the Jewish population.

== History ==
King Louis Bonaparte, who strongly supported Jewish emancipation, proposed to raise the unit as part of his efforts to improve the equality of Jews in his kingdom. Until the Batavian Revolution of 1795, Jews had traditionally been excluded from most professions, including military service.

King Louis on 7 April 1809 proposed to "raise a corps of troops of officers, non-commissioned officers and soldiers consisting entirely of Israelites", confirmed by royal decree on 8 July which stated the purpose of "allowing all Israelite subjects to support the defence of the fatherland, like any other subjects of the realm". Louis decreed that all Jewish males aged 18 to 45 who were dependent on poor relief would be obliged to join the corps, and anyone who refused to enlist would be removed from the welfare rolls.

The corps was created, based in The Hague, and its officers were appointed. However, the unit could never muster enough recruits. There was little support for the unit among the Dutch Jewish community, based on the general unpopularity of military service at that time, as well as concerns that recruits would not be able to carry out their religious practices while in military service, such as eating kosher food and observing the Shabbat. The government tried to win recruits by issuing a propaganda brochure printed in both Yiddish and Dutch, urging the Jews to join the corps, and Chief Rabbi Jacob Moses Löwenstamm and other rabbis gave sermons in support of the corps, but these efforts had little effect. Löwenstamm's public support was probably enforced by the government, as in an unpublished sermon he condemned Jewish conscription, questioning the ability of Jewish conscripts to observe their religious practices.

On 3 November of that year the Dutch government announced that Louis had decided to disband the unit due to lack of interest from the Jewish community. Its members were dispersed amongst other units.

== See also ==
- History of the Jews in the Netherlands
