= Pierre Auguste Brahain Ducange =

Pierre Auguste Brahain Ducange (? in Tours – 1833 in Paris) was a French journalist, minor diplomat, secret agent, swindler, and author. He was the father of the French author Victor Henri Joseph Brahain Ducange. He played an important role in the coup d'état of 22 January 1798 in the Batavian Republic, by general Herman Willem Daendels, which brought the radical unitarist faction of Wybo Fijnje and Pieter Vreede to power, and he helped write the Staatsregeling voor het Bataafse Volk of 1798 (the first Dutch Constitution).

== Early career ==
Little is known about Ducange's life before 1783, the year in which his son was born. As a matter of fact, the name "Ducange" seems to have been assumed, as Ducange calls himself around this time "Brahain, dit Ducange." Still, in many sources he is designated "Ducange," or "Brahain Ducange," so that is the name that will be used here. In 1783 he also published Oeuvres commentées du sieur Hadoux: expliquées et rendues intelligibles under the elaborate pseudonym André d'Acunenga Rhiba, which is an anagram of his name.

He was secretary of the French ambassador to the Dutch Republic, Charles Olivier de Saint-Georges de Vérac until the ambassador discovered that he had leaked confidential information to a Dutch newspaper, and dismissed him. Before his employment at the embassy he apparently was a French tutor in a Dutch family in Amsterdam, and an occasional journalist. He lived in The Hague, got married and had several children. In 1782 he committed to translate the successful poem Germanicus bij the famous dutch poët Lucretia van Merken, which he completed in 1787. In 1785 he moved with his family to Leiden, where he became a fulltime journalist for teh Gazette de Leyde, at that moment led by the patriotic Etienne Luzac. After the Prussian intervention in the Patriot Revolt of 1787 he travelled for a time to Spain, where he reputedly earned a living as a swindler. Around 1790 he was back in the Netherlands, where he took up his journalistic work in Leiden as an editor of the French-language Gazette de Leyde; in 1792 he went to Paris, where he was active in Jacobin circles. He briefly published a newspaper there, entitled Le Batave (""The Batavian"), which agitated for war against the Dutch Republic. In 1792 he returned to Leiden where he formed a group of revolutionaries, with Etienne Luzac, Joost Romswinckel, G.J. Hahn, Y. van Hamelsveld, J.H. de Ridder van Almkerk, J. Blauw and the journalist Drijfveer. During the next few years he apparently worked as a police spy for the French government, especially during the Reign of Terror. After the fall of the Robespierre regime he had to go abroad for a while to Germany, again apparently entering into a life of crime, until he suddenly emerged again in The Hague at the end of 1797 in the retinue of the new French ambassador to the Batavian Republic, Charles-François Delacroix. He was appointed secretary of the ambassador, but apparently was also charged with keeping a discreet eye on the ambassador for Barras.

== The coup d'état of 22 January 1798 and its aftermath ==
At this time the politicians of the Batavian Republic were in the process of writing a Constitution amid much political strife. Roughly speaking there were three political factions vying for the upper hand: a group of "federalists," who wanted to maintain the decentralized structure of the old Dutch Republic; and two factions of "unitarists," one moderate, and one radical, who wanted to transform the new Republic into a unitary state. It was Delacroix' mission to impose a Constitution following the model of the Constitution of the Year III. However, in this task he was hindered by the fact that he didn't speak Dutch. Ducange, on the other hand was fluent in Dutch, and therefore able to act as Delacroix' trusted henchman in this projet d'une constitution pour la République batave. However, Ducange acted more as an intermediary with the radical faction of unitarists, and thanks to him Delacroix in the course of January, 1798 accepted their version of the draft-Constitution in preference to the French draft.

This official French endorsement encouraged the radicals to impose their will by force on their political opponents. On 22 January 1798 Dutch and French troops, commanded by generals Daendels and Joubert, surrounded The Hague, and the political opponents of the radicals in the National Assembly were arrested. The rump-Assembly next declared itself to be a Constituante, ready to promulgate a new constitution. A committee was charged with drafting this new constitution. Ducange took part in the deliberations of this committee on a daily basis (reporting back to Delacroix each night), and even translated certain parts into French for the benefit of his French principals. The fact that he kept a watchful eye, and that Delacroix had to trust his reports implicitly, probably helped to smooth the acceptance of the draft by the French "sister republic," even though it was not a slavish copy of the French model, and contained some peculiarly Dutch elements.

The draft-constitution was approved in a referendum on 25 April and came into force on 1 May. However, soon discontent with the high-handed policies of the radicals began to grow. This discontent was also directed against Ducange, whose sometimes abrasive behavior and evident influential position were resented. He was specifically blamed for the decision of the radicals on 4 May to continue the rump-Assembly in office and not to hold new elections. Soon intrigues back in Paris caused the Directoire to demand his recall to France. Delacroix own recall soon followed. None too soon, as he had become identified with the radical regime that was overthrown by a new coup d'état in June, 1798, again by general Daendels, who had now thrown in his lot with the moderate unitarists.

== Later career ==
After this we again lose sight of Ducange for a few years, but in 1803 the French government sent him as a secret agent to Vienna to spy on French émigrés. When the Austrian police caught wind of this intrigue, Ducange had to flee, first to Saxony, and later back to France, where he was locked up in the Temple prison for a few years. Released in 1806 he again was arrested in 1808 and convicted as a swindler.

In later years he seems to have taken up the pen again. In 1821 he published a children's book offering models for letter-writing, Le sécretaire des enfants, ou correspondence entre plusieurs enfants propre à les former au style épistolaire. At the time he worked as a copyist.

He died in Paris in 1833, the same year in which his son also died.

== Sources ==
- (in Dutch) Mendels, I. (1890) Hermann Willem Daendels, p. 133 ff.
- (in French) Elias, A. (7 mars 2008) "La néerlandicité de la constitution de 1798", in Annales historiques de la Révolution française, Numéro 326
