= Batavian Revolution =

1781–1795 period in Dutch history

- Part of the Atlantic Revolutions
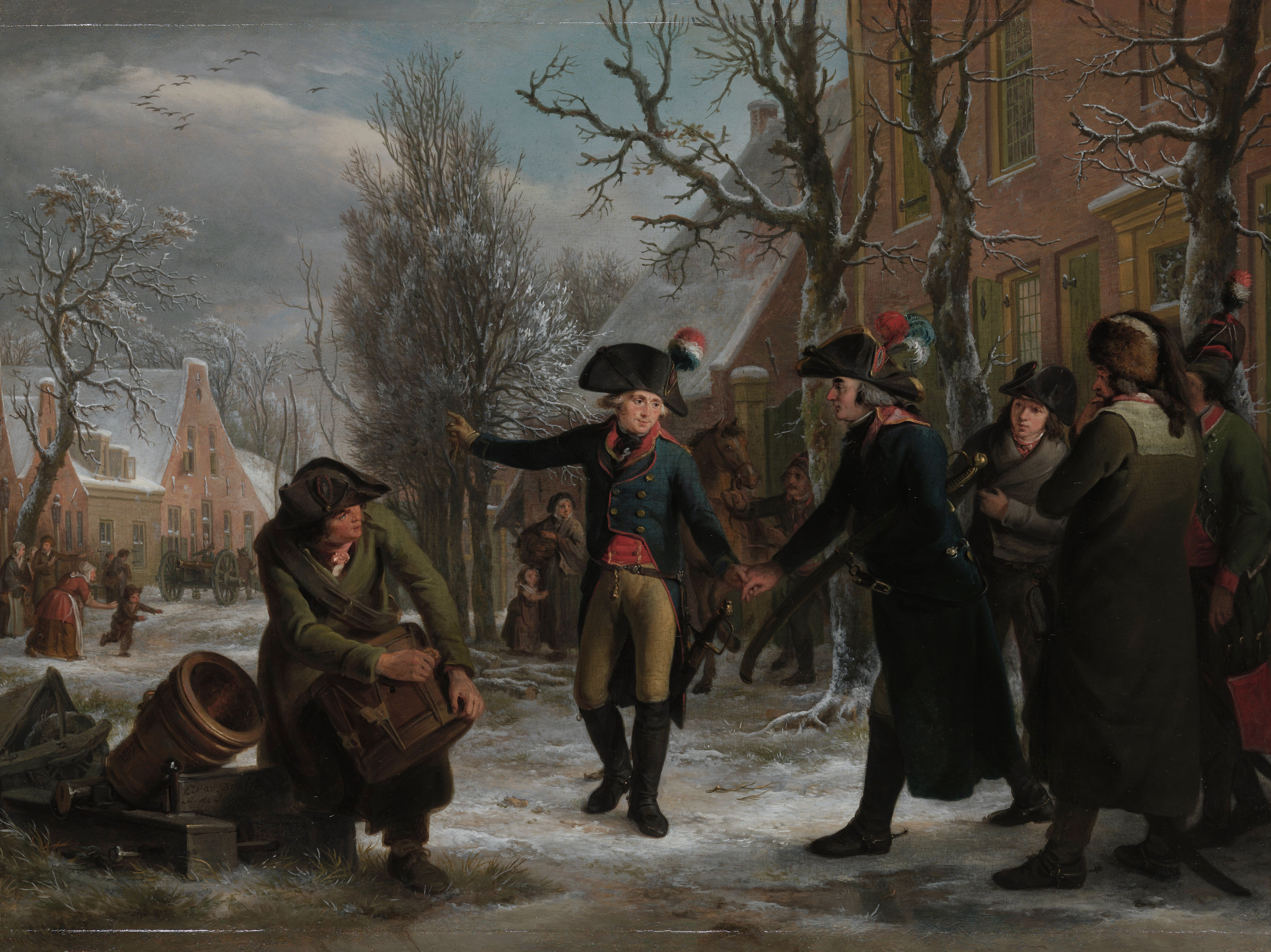
- Patriot troops, 18 January 1795
- Date: 1781–1795
- Location: Dutch Republic
- Caused by: Authoritarianism of William V
- Goals: Abolition of the position of Stadtholder; Establishment of a democratic republic
- Result: Batavian Republic established

Parties
Patriots	Orangists

Lead figures
R. Schimmelpenninck; Herman W. Daendels; (French First Republic) Jean-Charles Pichegru	William V; Wilhelmina; Laurens Pieter; Frederick William II; James Harris

The Batavian Revolution (Dutch: De Bataafse Revolutie) was a time of political, social and cultural turmoil at the end of the 18th century that marked the end of the Dutch Republic and saw the proclamation of the Batavian Republic.

The initial period, from about 1780 to 1787, is known as the Patriottentijd or "Time of the Patriots". The power of the "Patriots" grew until the stadtholder, William V, felt he had to flee the country in 1785. He asked his brother-in-law Frederick William II of Prussia for help, and in 1787 a relatively small Prussian army restored the Orangists to power with little fighting.

After the French Revolution began in 1789, "Patriot" dissent grew, and in the severe winter of 1794/'95 a French army with some "Patriot" Dutch units invaded over the frozen frontier rivers, leading to the Batavian Revolution and the proclamation of the Batavian Republic in 1795. The period of Dutch history that followed the revolution is also referred to as the "Batavian-French era" (1795–1813) even though the time spanned was only 20 years, of which three were under French occupation under Napoleon Bonaparte.

== Background ==
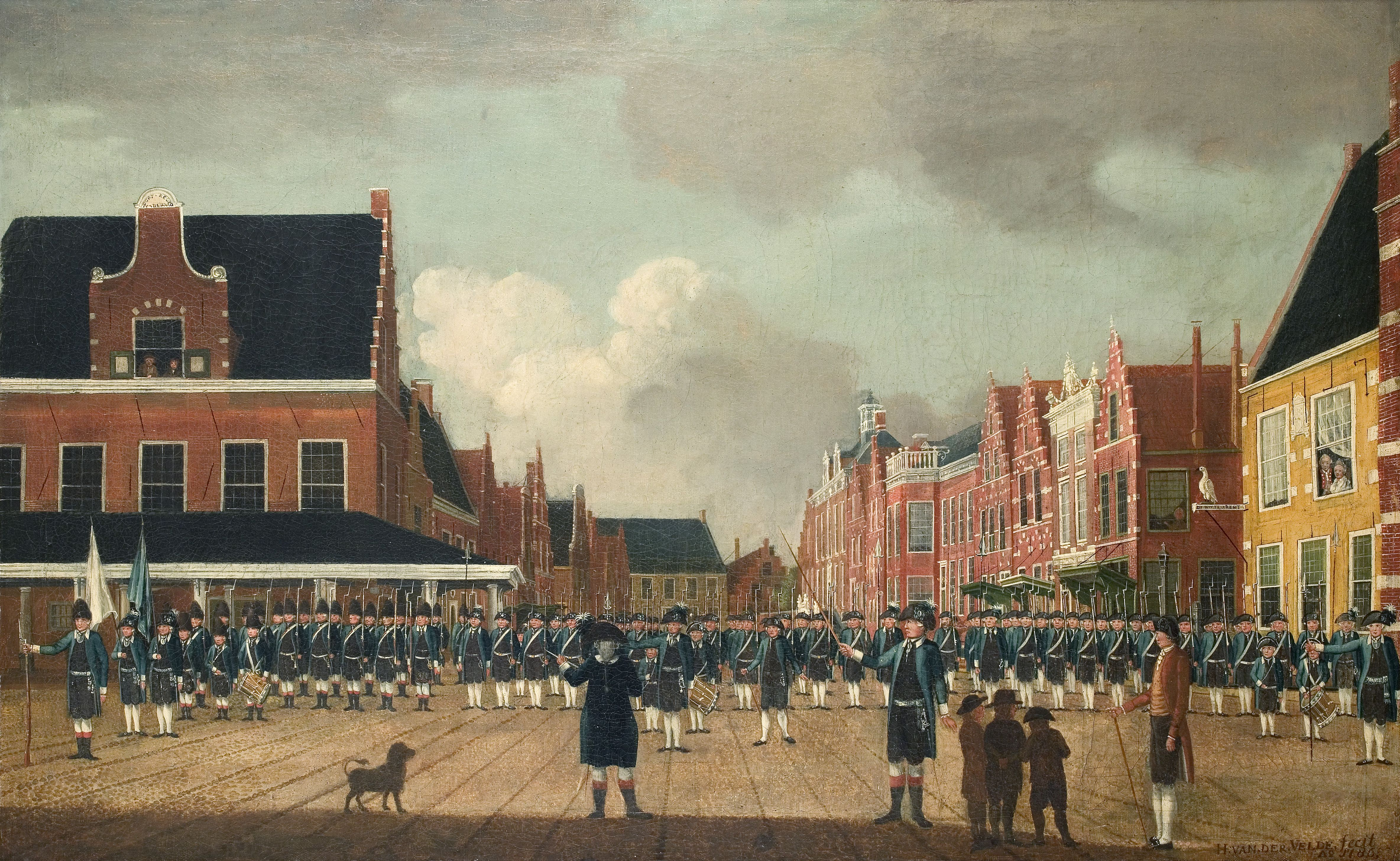
The exercitiegenootschap of Sneek

By the end of the 18th century, the Netherlands found themselves in a deep economic crisis, caused by the devastating Fourth Anglo-Dutch War. During this time, the banks of the Dutch Republic held much of the world's capital. The government-sponsored banks owned up to 40% of Great Britain's national debt. The people of the Netherlands grew increasingly discontent with the authoritarian regime of the stadtholder, William V. This concentration of wealth led to the formation of the Dutch Patriots by a minor Dutch noble named Joan van der Capellen tot den Pol, who were seeking to reduce the amount of power held by the stadtholder.

Thus, a division emerged between the Orangists, who supported the stadtholder, and the Patriots who, inspired by the ideals of the Enlightenment, desired a more democratic government and a more equal society. The Patriots built support from most of the middle-class, and founded militias (Exercitiegenootschappen) of armed civilians which between 1783 and 1787 managed to take over several cities and regions in an effort to force new elections which would oust the old government officials. The Patriots held the western part of the Netherlands with the Holland (including Amsterdam) and the city of Utrecht, while the Orangists held the eastern part with the states of Guelders and Utrecht.

In 1785, stadtholder William V fled his palace in the west of the country for Nijmegen in the east, as the States of Holland were not willing to send their troops to fight the Patriots. In May 1787, the stadholder's troops were defeated by the militia of Utrecht near Vreeswijk. When Princess Wilhelmina was stopped by patriot militia near Goejanverwellesluis on 28 June 1787, she applied to her brother Frederick William II of Prussia for help. On 13 September, a Prussian army of 20,000 men under the command of Duke of Brunswick crossed the border. The fortress of Vianen was deserted, and the city of Utrecht opened its gates. At the fortress of Woerden preparations for defence were made, but there was no actual resistance when the Prussians arrived. In Amsterdam several houses of patriot regents were plundered by mobs. The stadholder returned to The Hague, and Amsterdam, the last city to hold out, surrendered on 10 October.

The Patriots continued urging citizens to resist the government by distributing pamphlets, creating "Patriot Clubs" and holding public demonstrations. The government responded by pillaging the towns where the opposition was concentrated. Most Patriots went into exile in France, while Orangists strengthened their grip on Dutch government chiefly through the Grand Pensionary Laurens Pieter van de Spiegel.

== Proclamation of the Republic ==
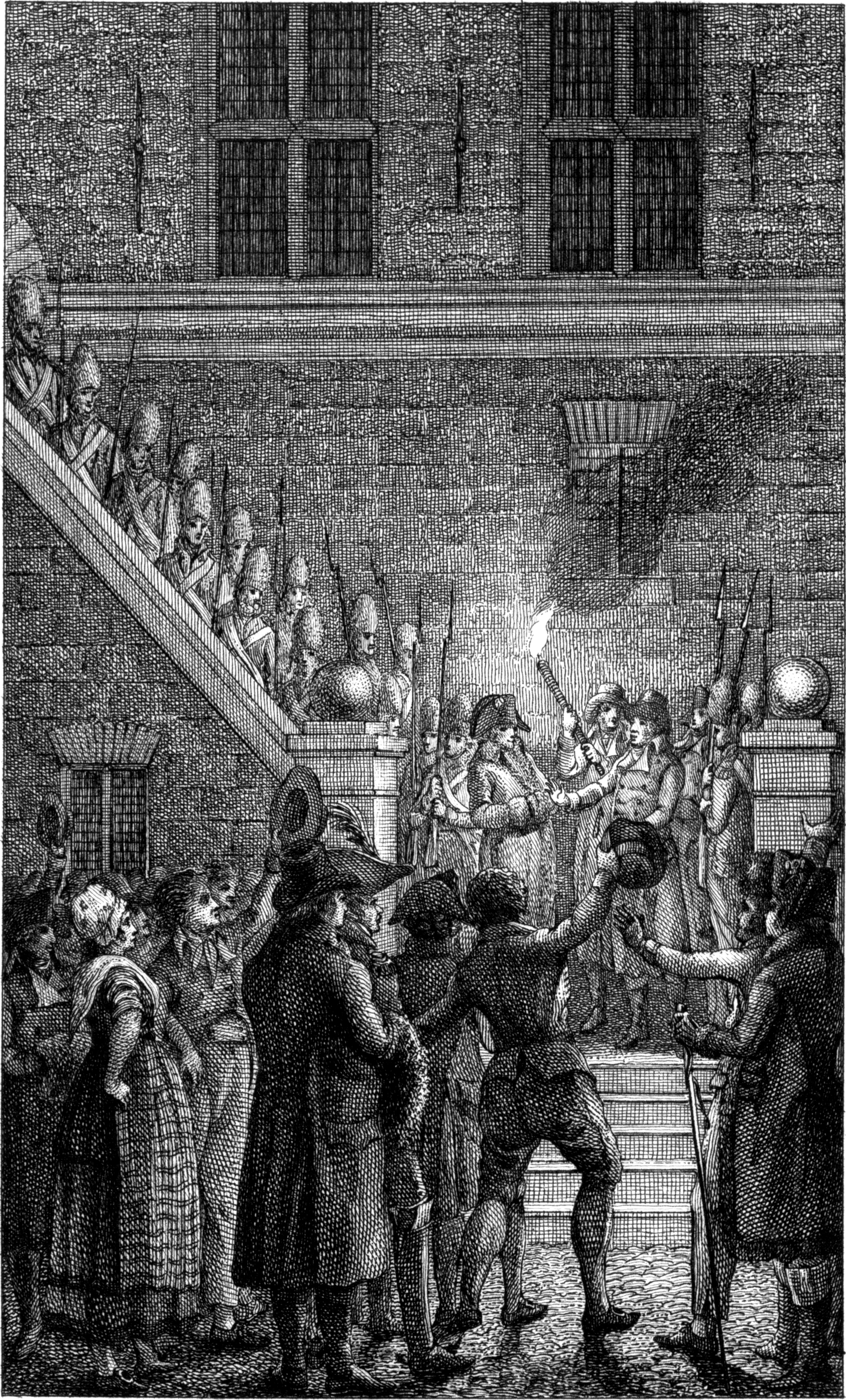
Beginning of the revolution in Amsterdam, 19 January 1795

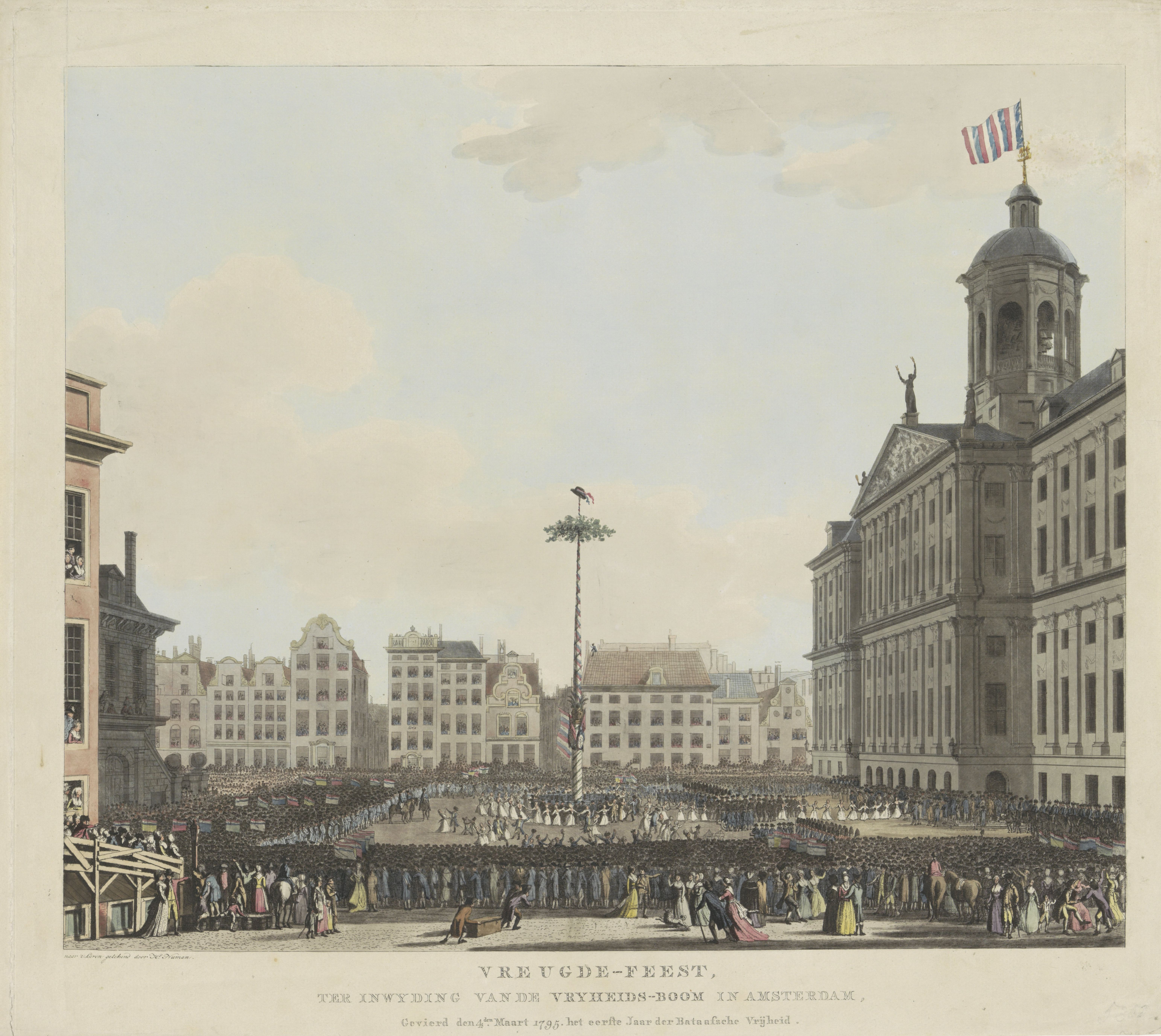
Solumn inauguration of a liberty tree on Dam Square in Amsterdam on 4 March 1795

The restoration was temporary, however. Only two years later, the French Revolution began, which embraced many of the political ideas that the Patriots had espoused in their own revolt. The Patriots enthusiastically supported the Revolution, and when the French revolutionary armies started spreading it, the Patriots joined in, hoping to liberate their own country from its authoritarian yoke. The Stadtholder joined the ill-fated First Coalition of countries in their attempt to subdue the suddenly anti-Austrian French First Republic. This War of the First Coalition also proceeded disastrously for the Stadtholder's forces, and in the severe winter of 1794/'95 a French army under general Charles Pichegru, with a Dutch contingent under general Herman Willem Daendels, crossed the great frozen rivers that traditionally protected the Netherlands from invasion. Aided by the fact that a substantial proportion of the Dutch population looked favourably upon the French incursion, and often considered it a liberation, the French were quickly able to break the resistance of the forces of the Stadtholder, and his Austrian and British allies. However, in many cities revolution broke out even before the French arrived and Revolutionary Committees took over the city governments, and (provisionally) the national government also. The States of Holland and West Friesland, for instance, were abolished and replaced with the Provisional Representatives of the People of Holland.

== Aftermath ==
The Batavian Revolution ended with the proclamation of the Batavian Republic in 1795. William was forced to flee to England, from where he issued the Kew Letters ordering all Dutch colonies to cooperate with British efforts to occupy them. Several coups followed in 1798, 1801 and 1805 which brought different groups of Patriots to power. Though the French presented themselves as liberators, many disagreed. The Batavian Republic saw its end in 1806, when the Kingdom of Holland was founded, with Napoleon's brother, Louis, as King of Holland. In 1810, the area was annexed into the First French Empire. In 1813, the Netherlands regained their independence, with William's son William Frederick as sovereign prince and first King of the Netherlands; inaugurated as William I.

== See also ==
- Batavian Revolution in Amsterdam
