= Batavian Revolution in Amsterdam =

Political event in 1795, the Netherlands

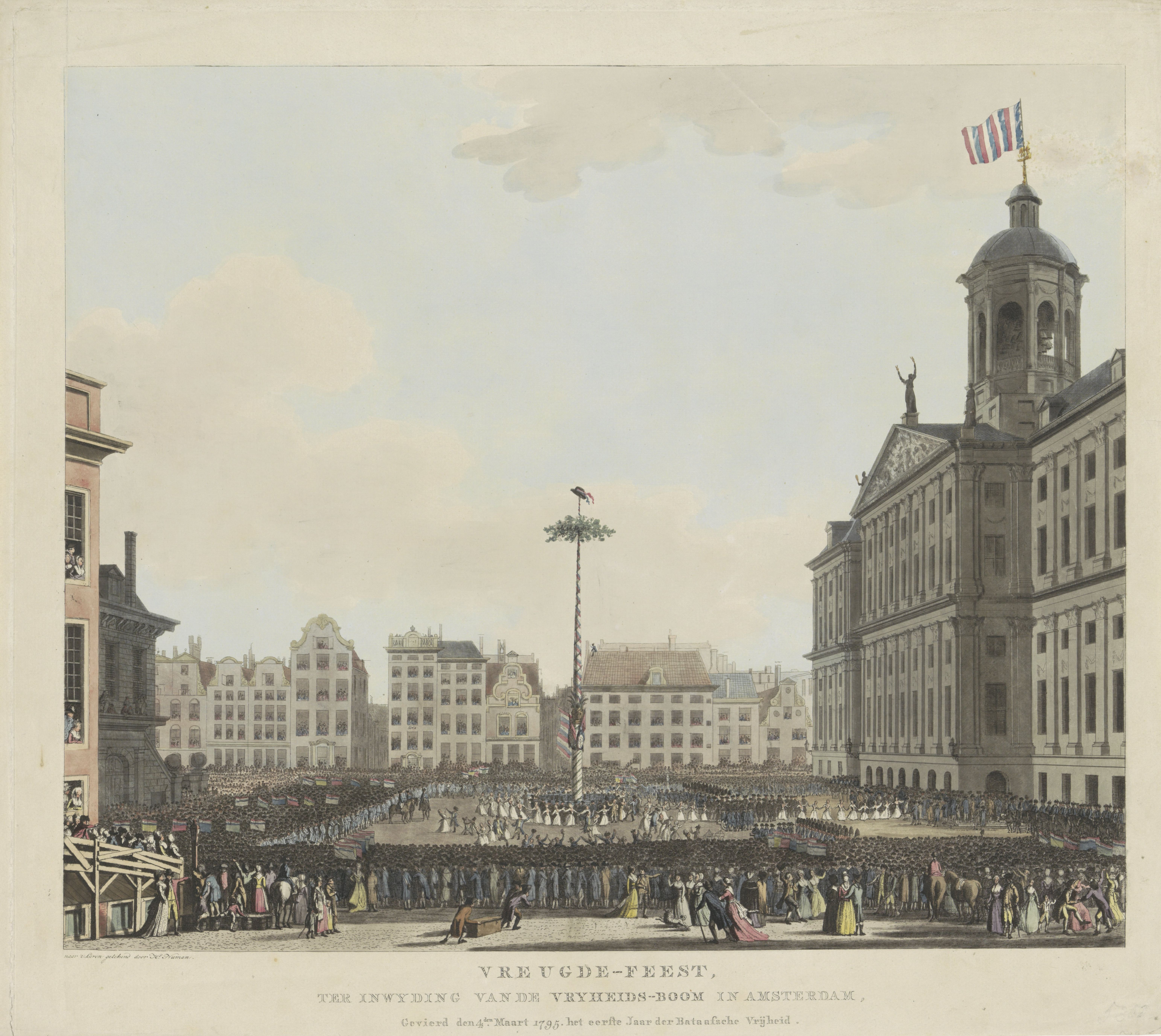
Liberty tree inaugurated on Dam Square, 4 March 1795; by H. Numan

The Batavian Revolution in Amsterdam refers to the transfer of power in the city of Amsterdam on 18 January 1795 to a Revolutionary Committee of the new Batavian Republic. The same day the stadtholder of the Dutch Republic, William V, Prince of Orange, fled the country. Amsterdam was the first city that declared itself in the Batavian Revolution that brought about the Batavian Republic.

== Background ==
Amsterdam had been a hotbed of Patriot revolutionary fervour during the Patriot Revolution of 1785–1787. After the Prussian invasion of Holland in 1787 and the subsequent Orangist repression, the city reverted to control by the ancien regime of the stadtholder. The Dutch Republic became a de facto Anglo-Prussian client state whose foreign policy was determined in London and Berlin, while the exiled Patriots in Pas de Calais and Paris plotted its overthrow. When the revolutionary French First Republic declared war on Great Britain and the Dutch Republic on 1 February 1793, the exiles strongly favoured the inclusion of the Dutch territory. During the early Flanders Campaign, the exiles formed their own "Batavian Legion" that (like its Belgian equivalent) fought side by side with the armies of general Charles François Dumouriez under command of general Herman Willem Daendels. However, despite an incursion into North Brabant (then part of the non-self-governing Generality Lands), the attack on the Dutch Republic was unsuccessful after the French defeat at Neerwinden. Dumouriez defected to Austria.

In 1794, the campaign was more successful for the French and their Batavian allies. North Brabant was again invaded by the French army under general Charles Pichegru and occupied up to the river Waal. This proved as yet too much of an obstacle for the French. Nevertheless, the French success had emboldened the Patriot partisans that had remained in Amsterdam. Despite the vigilance of the political police of the stadtholder, they had been able to form secret societies, masquerading as "reading clubs" that spread revolutionary propaganda, and prepared for insurrection by secretly amassing arms in an arsenal near Bickerseiland. Ringleaders were Alexander Gogel, Nicolaas van Staphorst and Cornelis Rudolphus Theodorus Krayenhoff, the latter acting as Military Officer of the Amsterdam Revolutionary Committee.

On 14 October 1794, the stadtholder (aware that something was afoot) ordered the city council of Amsterdam to take measures to ensure that civil order would be preserved. The garrison under General Gabriel Golovkin was reinforced with 4,000 British troops. That same day, however, the Patriot insurrection began. The Patriots presented a petition to the city regents, protesting the billeting of British troops in Amsterdam, and this was supposed to be the signal for the revolt. This did not materialise, due to the intimidation by the garrison troops, that occupied strategic points with cannon and barricades. The petition had inadvertently provided the political police with the names and addresses of the would-be revolutionaries and these were rounded up following 17 October. Before they were ordered to appear at court on 28 October, the group (e.g. Gogel, Van Staphorst, and Krayenhoff), fled the city; the latter joined the central Patriot Revolutionary Committee at the French headquarters in 's-Hertogenbosch. Van Staphorst hid in Kampen at Jacobus Kantelaar; Gogol went to Bremen.

== Takeover of the city government ==
During the Winter of 1794, French troops had been on the Waal river, poised to advance. Only when the river froze over, in the severe weather that started mid December, were they able to go forward. They advanced very rapidly due to the collapse of the Dutch army and their British, Prussian, and Austrian allies. A number of important cities fell in rapid succession. On 16 January 1795 General Joseph Souham accepted the surrender of the city of Utrecht after Prussian troops under general Ludwig von Wallmoden-Gimborn had evacuated the Utrecht province. By Spring 1795, the last British troops had been evacuated from the Dutch Republic.

The Batavian Revolutionary Committee followed these developments with mixed feelings. Well aware of the French predilection for annexation (as their Belgian neighbours had experienced the previous year) they deemed it necessary that a big Dutch city should be taken by Dutch efforts next, so as to demonstrate that the pretensions of the committee to exercise independent authority could be validated. Amsterdam was the obvious choice. The news of the fall of Utrecht galvanized the remnants of the Amsterdam Revolutionary Committee into action on 17 January. Posters and handbills appeared on every street corner and rumours started to fly that the revolutionaries would seize power the next day.

That next day, Sunday 18 January, the Revolutionary Committee met secretly in their haunt, a tavern by the name of Het Wapen van Embden ("the Emden Arms") on the Nieuwendijk street, near the Amsterdam city hall. A substantial crowd gathered and a deputation, led by Gogel, was sent at the head of this crowd to city hall to demand arms "so as to be able to maintain public order." As in October of the previous year, mayor Matthijs Straalman refused to be intimidated and ordered out the garrison. However, differently than in October, General Golovkin now hesitated as he was reluctant to shed blood with the French so nearby. His mind was made up when that same evening Krayenhoff arrived in a French lieutenant's uniform, bearing a commission from the central Revolutionary Committee in Utrecht to remove the "illegal" Orangist city government.

The Patriot Revolutionary Committee (whose members included Samuel Iperusz. Wiselius and Nicolaas van Staphorst) deemed it important to liberate an important city itself, without direct French aid, to support its claims to independent authority in the Netherlands. It therefore sent Krayenhoff to Amsterdam, in a French lieutenant's uniform, to organize another insurrection. On Sunday afternoon – at Daendels' instruction – Krayenhoff came to tell Amsterdam's burgomasters that they had better resign the next day. Golovkin unexpectedly went along with this charade and in effect surrendered the city to Krayenhoff then and there. Krayenhoff next proceeded to city hall at the head of an enormous crowd and demanded the surrender of the city from Straalman. The latter tried to stall, but the crowd became threatening, and fearing for his personal safety Straalman transferred command of the garrison to Krayenhoff at midnight. Amsterdam had "fallen" to an unarmed Dutch revolutionary.

The next morning, 19 January, the Amsterdam Revolutionary Committee, with Rutger Jan Schimmelpenninck as its president, rode in a triumphant procession of carriages to city hall, where they proceeded to read a proclamation declaring that the incumbent city councilors had forfeited their offices. It also promised democratic elections of a new city government (the first in the history of the city, as previously it had always been governed by an oligarchy) in the near future. Meanwhile, a provisional government of 22 members was put in charge of the city. This provisional government had as its first order of business the welcome of advancing French troops (who had delayed their advance from Utrecht in expectation of a positive outcome). A group of French chasseurs arrived that afternoon to general acclaim. On 19 January, the population erected a liberty tree on Dam Square in thick snow.

== Aftermath ==
The previous night, around midnight of 18 January, stadtholder William V followed his wife Wilhelmina, who had left the previous morning, into exile, boarding a fishing vessel at the Scheveningen beach. Much of the Pro-British faction of the city of Amsterdam fled along with the Prince of Orange, so there was very little opposition to the change of power. The British armies made no effort to retake Amsterdam, instead, they continued retreating towards Bremen – from which they were eventually evacuated in March 1795.

The model of the transfer of power in Amsterdam was soon followed in other Dutch cities not yet occupied by the French. Revolutionary committees sprang up left and right, demanding surrender of the ruling city councils to new provisional administrations and the disarmament of the Orangist civic militias and their replacement with "Free Corps" companies from the days of the 1785–1787 Patriot Revolt. In this way, Schiedam, Haarlem, and Leeuwarden, to mention a few, experienced peaceful revolutions of their own. Only the Orangist stronghold of The Hague held out; its Orangist city government sought its own accommodation with the French and it was only replaced on 26 February.

The Amsterdam Revolutionary Committee took the initiative to convene a constituent assembly of representatives of the cities that constituted the constituencies of the States of Holland and West Friesland on 24 January. This resulted in two days later in the abolition of those States and their replacement with the Provisional Representatives of the People of Holland.

== Sources ==
- Harvey, Robert. War of Wars: The Epic Struggle Between Britain and France 1789–1815. London, 2007
- Schama, S. (1977), Patriots and Liberators. Revolution in the Netherlands 1780–1813, New York, Vintage books, ISBN 0-679-72949-6
