= Revolutionary Committee of the Batavian Republic =

The Revolutionary Committee of the Batavian Republic was formed on 17 January 1795, when revolution broke out in the Netherlands against the regime of prince William V of Orange. The French army defeated the Dutch Republic and William fled to Great Britain. Many refugees, who had fled the Netherlands after the Prussian invasion on behalf of prince William V in 1787, could now return. The new Batavian Republic was based on revolutionary principles similar to France. The presidents of the Revolutionary Committee acted as heads of state of the Netherlands (only recognized by France).

== Dutch Heads of state in 1795 ==
17 January 1795 – 6 February 1795

- Wijbo Fijnje
- Pieter Paulus

== See also ==
- Rutger Jan Schimmelpenninck
