= Scheringa Museum of Realist Art =

- Scheringa Museum voor Realisme
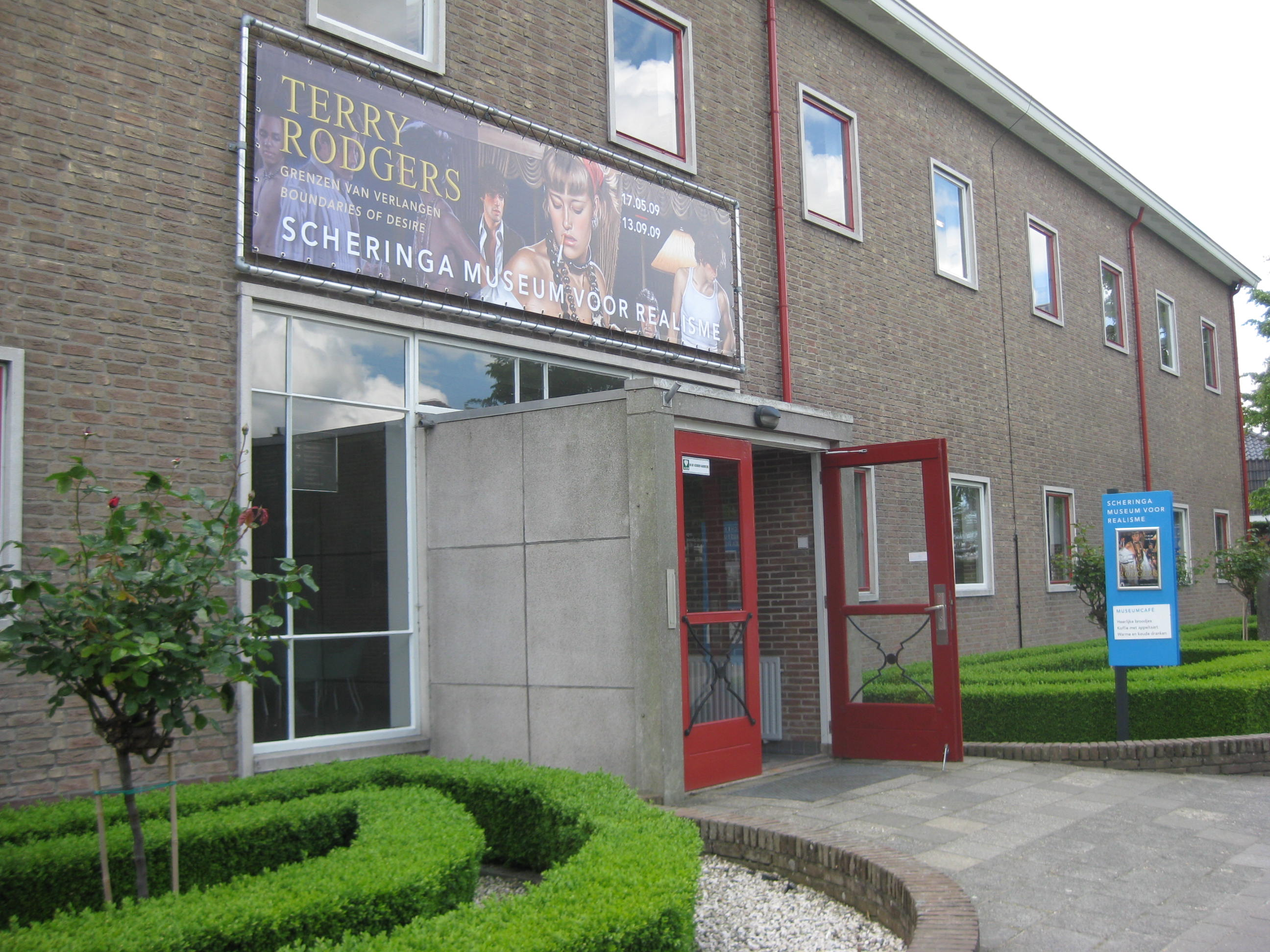
- Scheringa Museum
- Established: 1997
- Dissolved: 2009
- Location: Spanbroekerweg 162; Spanbroek, Netherlands
- Coordinates: 52.698149°N 4.961164°E
- Type: Art museum

Scheringa Museum of Realist Art (until 2005, Frisia Museum) was a museum in Spanbroek, North Holland, the Netherlands that housed around five hundred works of the 20th-century art mainly realist art and contemporary. It opened in February 1997 and closed in 2009. The museum was owned by the DSB Bank, and the name refers to Dirk Scheringa, the bank founder.

After the DSB Bank went bankrupt, the collection was retained by ABN AMRO as a guarantee, and this forced the closure of the museum. Later, the collection passed to the Deutsche Bank, which decided to sell it to an undisclosed individual for 14 million Euro. The plans were stopped in 2011 by a court in Amsterdam, which decided that the price was too low. In March 2012, the Dutch part of the collection was bought by Hans Melchers. It is on display in Museum MORE.

== Interior and contents ==
Works by Pyke Koch, Raoul Hynckes, Wim Schuhmacher and Dick Ket.

Works by Dutch Realists - Jan Mankes, Charley Toorop, Edgar Fernhout, Jan van Tongeren, Johan Mekkink, Johan Ponsioen, Sal Meijer, Ferdinand Erfmann, Paul Huf and Fong Leng.

Works by international artists such as René Magritte, Paul Delvaux, Giorgio de Chirico, Alexander Kanoldt, Tamara de Lempicka and Tobeen.

Post-war art and figure art by Lucian Freud, Marlene Dumas, Fernando Botero, Jean Rustin, Co Westerik and Jan Beutener.
