= 1940 in art =

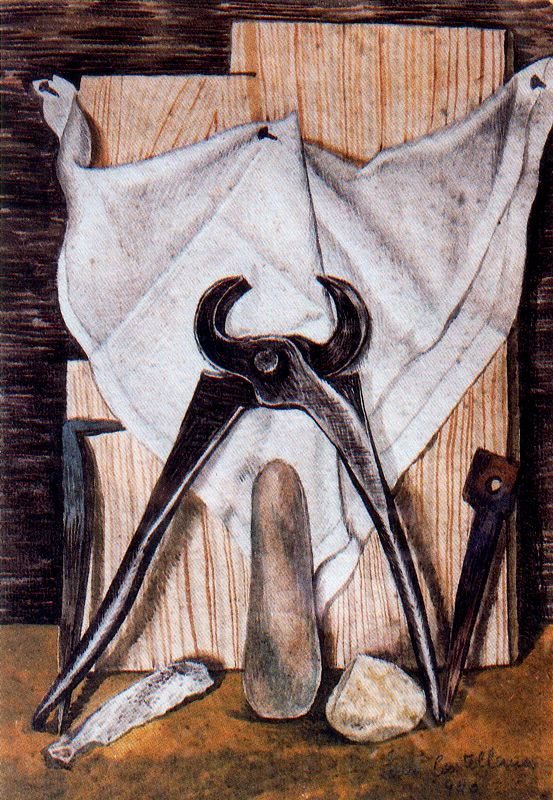
Attributes of Passion (1940), by Luis Castellanos. Watercolor on paper: 20 x 30 cm. Santiago Medina-Castellanos Collection. Madrid, Spain.

Events from the year 1940 in art.

== Events ==
- February – The series of 'Careless Talk Costs Lives' propaganda posters by 'Fougasse' is published by the Ministry of Information (United Kingdom).
- March – The Tartu Art Museum is officially established in Tartu, Estonia; its first exhibition is opened in November 1940.
- July – The Reichsleiter Rosenberg Taskforce (Einsatzstab Reichsleiter Rosenberg) of the Nazi Party begins its task of appropriating cultural property from occupied territories, initially in France.
- October – Grandma Moses' second solo exhibition, "What a Farm Wife Painted", opens at Otto Kallir's Galerie Saint-Etienne in New York City.
- November 3 – The War Artists' Advisory Committee of the U.K. Ministry of Information opens its first exhibition of War Pictures by British Artists to the public at the otherwise-evacuated National Gallery in London.
- November 13 – Release of Walt Disney's animated movie Fantasia in the United States.
- December 8 – Mexican painters Frida Kahlo and Diego Rivera remarry in San Francisco (U.S.)
- Cecil Beaton is among the photographers commissioned by the U.K. Ministry of Information to undertake war photography.
- Xawery Dunikowski is deported to Auschwitz concentration camp, where he survives until 1945.
- Jacques Lipchitz flees France for the United States.
- Henry Moore is commissioned as a war artist and produces drawings of Londoners sleeping in the London Underground while sheltering from The Blitz.
- Anthony Blunt's Artistic Theory in Italy 1450–1600 is published. This year he is recruited to work for MI5 while simultaneously spying for the NKVD.

== Awards ==
- Archibald Prize: Max Meldrum – Dr J Forbes McKenzie

== Works ==
=== Paintings ===
- Vanessa Bell – Leonard Woolf
- Pierre Bonnard – Oranges et Kakis (c.)
- Clive Branson – Noreen and Rosa
- Howard Chandler Christy – Scene at the Signing of the Constitution of the United States
- Charles Cundall – The Withdrawal from Dunkirk, June 1940
- Salvador Dalí
  - The Face of War
  - Slave Market with the Disappearing Bust of Voltaire
- 'Fougasse' – Careless Talk Costs Lives (propaganda posters)
- Jared French – Glenway Wescott, George Platt Lynes, Monroe Wheeler (series of nude portraits)
- Jesús Guerrero Galván – Head of a Woman
- Edward Hopper
  - Gas
  - Office at Night
- Frida Kahlo
  - The Dream
  - Self-Portrait Dedicated to Dr. Eloesser
  - Self-Portrait with Cropped Hair
  - Self-Portrait with Monkey
  - Self-Portrait with Thorn Necklace and Hummingbird
  - The Wounded Table
- Raymond McGrath – Training Aircraft Under Construction
- Conroy Maddox – The Strange Country
- Henri Matisse
  - La Blouse Roumaine
  - Le Rêve de 1940
- Roberto Matta – Dark Light
- John Piper
  - Interior of Coventry Cathedral, November 15th, 1940
  - The Passage to the Control-room at South West Regional Headquarters, Bristol
  - St Mary le Port, Bristol
- Candido Portinari – Seascape
- Eric Ravilious – Watercolours
  - A Warship in Dock
  - Submarines in Dry Dock
  - Ship's Screw on a Railway Truck
  - Midnight Sun
- Charles Sheeler
  - Bucks County Barn
  - Fugue
  - Interior
- Situ Qiao – Put Down Your Whip
- Graham Sutherland
  - Black Landscape
  - Devastation, 1940: A House on the Welsh Border
- Hugh J. Ward – Portrait of Superman (Lehman College)
- Carel Willink – Wilma with Cat
- Grant Wood – Sentimental Ballad

=== Photographs ===
- Herbert Mason – St Paul's Survives
- Nickolas Muray – Soldiers of the Sky

=== Sculptures ===
- Eric Aumonier – The Archer (East Finchley tube station, London Passenger Transport Board)
- Carl Milles – The Wedding of the Waters (fountain, St. Louis, Missouri)
- Isamu Noguchi – News (stainless steel bas-relief, Rockefeller Center, New York)
- Attilio Piccirilli – Guglielmo Marconi (bronze, Washington, D.C.)
- José Ângelo Cottinelli Telmo (architect) and Leopoldo de Almeida (sculptor) – Padrão dos Descobrimentos (temporary version)

== Exhibitions ==
- Saved from Europe at Galerie St. Etienne in New York City

== Births ==
- January – Anthony d'Offay, British art dealer
- January 2 – Peter Young, American painter
- January 6 – John Byrne, Scottish painter and writer
- January 24
  - Vito Acconci, American conceptual artist, installation artist, performance artist and filmmaker (d. 2017)
  - Mel Bochner, American conceptual artist (d. 2025)
- February 5 – H. R. Giger, Swiss artist (d. 2014)
- February 22 – Billy Name, born William Linich Jr., American photographer, collaborator of Andy Warhol
- March 7 – Hannah Wilke, American painter, sculptor and photographer (d. 1993)
- March 9 - Giancarlo Impiglia, Italian born Italian-American painter
- March 20 – Mary Ellen Mark, American photographer (d. 2015)
- April 11 – Marcia Tucker, American museum curator (d. 2006)
- April 16 – Joan Snyder, American painter
- April 30 – Burt Young, born Gerald DeLouise, American actor, painter, and author (d. 2023)
- May 1 – Elsa Peretti, Italian jewelry designer (d. 2021)
- May 11 – Juan Downey, Chilean-American video artist (d. 1993)
- May 17 – Valie Export, Austrian avant-garde artist (d. 2026)
- May 25 – Nobuyoshi Araki, Japanese photographer
- June 17 – Alton Kelley, American poster and album artist (d. 2008)
- July 5 – Chuck Close, American "photorealistic" painter (d. 2021)
- July 27 – Pina Bausch, German neo-expressionist choreographer and dancer (d. 2009)
- August 23 – Galen Rowell, American wilderness photographer (d. 2002)
- September 6 – Elizabeth Murray, American painter, printmaker and draughtsman (d. 2007)
- September 10 – David Mann, American painter
- September 26 – Arno Rink, German painter and professor (d. 2017)
- September 27 – Rudolph Moshammer, German fashion designer (d. 2005)
- October 22 – Ashley Jackson, Malaysian-born Yorkshire landscape watercolourist
- date unknown
  - Germano Celant, Italian art critic, curator and historian (d. 2020)
  - Stevan Knežević, Serbian painter, sculptor and professor of art (d. 1995)
  - Anthony McCall, British-born American avant-garde installation artist, projected film
  - Dušan Otašević, Serbian painter and sculptor
  - Jaune Quick-to-See Smith, Native American painter and printmaker

== Deaths ==
- January 18 – Jonas Lie, Norwegian American landscape painter (b. 1880)
- February 11 – Ellen Day Hale, American painter and printmaker (b. 1855)
- February 27 – Nicolae Tonitza, Romanian painter and etcher (b. 1886)
- March 16 – Iso Rae, Australian Impressionist painter (b. 1860)
- April 15 – Alexandru Plămădeală, Moldovan sculptor (b. 1888)
- May 13 - Henry Charles Fehr, British sculptor (b. 1867)
- June 21 – Édouard Vuillard, French painter (b. 1868)
- June 29 – Paul Klee, Swiss painter expressionism, cubism, and surrealism (b. 1879)
- July 4 – Józef Pankiewicz, Polish painter, graphic artist and teacher (b. 1866)
- July 28 – Gerda Wegener, Danish artist (b. 1886)
- July 31 – Elfriede Lohse-Wächtler, German avant-garde painter, by involuntary euthanasia (b. 1899)
- August 22 – Paul Gösch, German artist and architect (b. 1885)
- September 5 – Frances Darlington, English relief sculpture (b. 1880)
- September 15 – Dick Ket, Dutch painter (b. 1902)
- September 27 – Walter Benjamin, German philosopher, "comparatist" and art critic (b. 1892)
- October 15 – Karl Uchermann, Norwegian canine painter (b. 1855)
- November 16 – Colin Gill, English war artist, muralist and portrait painter (b. 1892).
- November 17 – Eric Gill, English sculptor and engraver (b. 1882)
- date unknown – Francesco Stella, Italian painter and set designer (b. 1862)

== See also ==
- 1940 in fine arts of the Soviet Union
