= Museum MORE =

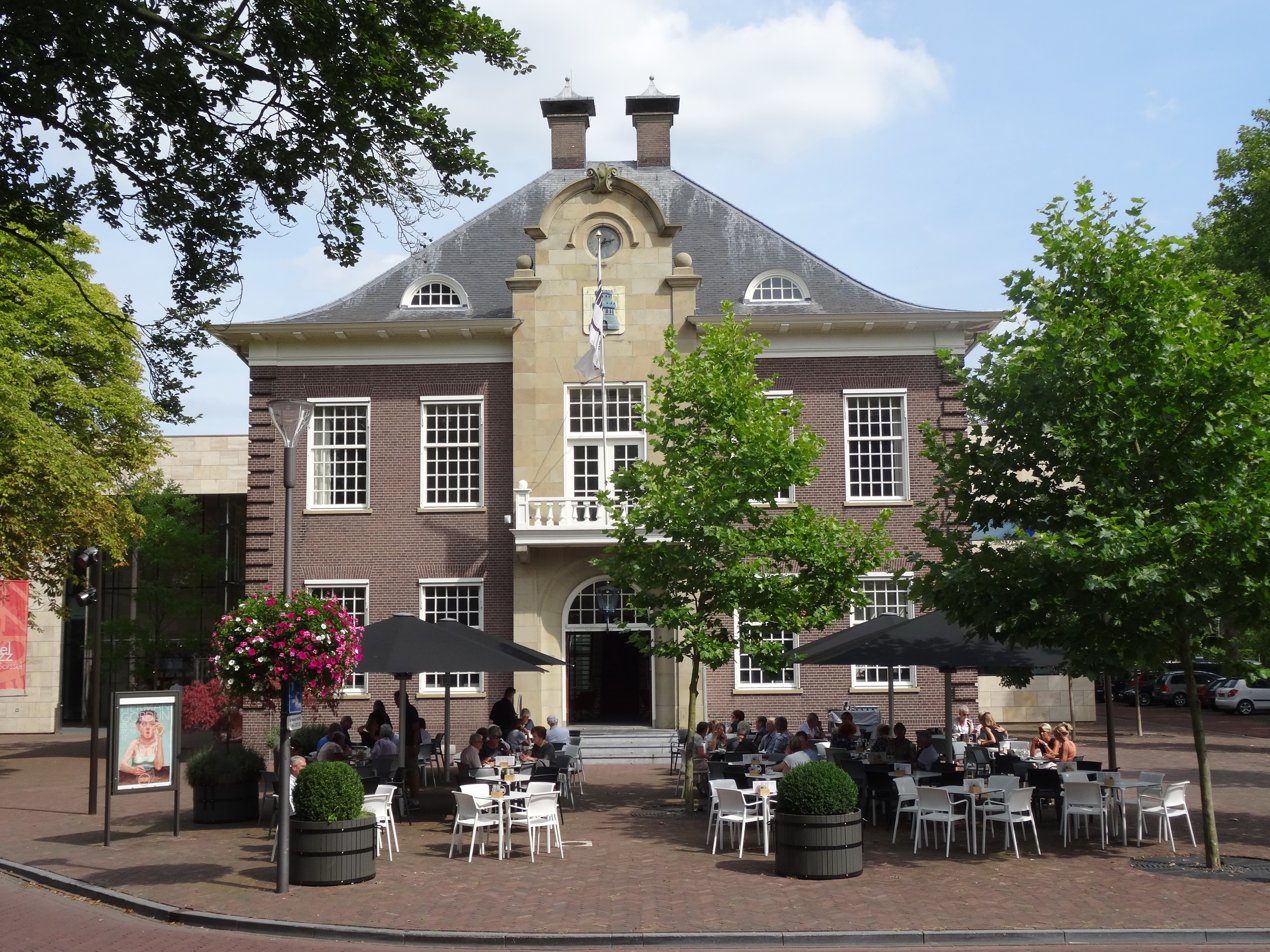
- Museum MORE in Gorssel
- Established: 2015.
- Location: Hoofdstraat 28, Gorssel, Netherlands
- Coordinates: 52°11′58.62″N 6°12′2.86″E
- Type: Art museum
- Collection size: 1,300+ objects
- Director: Maite van Dijk
- Architect: Hans van Heeswijk architects
- Website: www.museummore.nl

Museum MORE is a Dutch museum in Gorssel, Netherlands. Museum MORE is dedicated to Dutch Neorealism (art) (the name is an abbreviation of MOdern REalism). It is located in the former town hall of Gorssel, which was expanded for that purpose with seven exhibition spaces. The extension was designed by Dutch architect Hans van Heeswijk. Less than a year after the opening of the public on 2 June 2015, the museum was able to welcome its 100.000th visitor A second branch of Museum MORE, in Ruurlo Castle in the municipality of Gelderland Berkelland, was opened on June 23, 2017, by Pieter van Vollenhoven. In this castle one can find the collection Carel Willink / Fong Leng.

== Collection ==
The Hans Melchers collection is housed in Museum MORE and consists of a large number of works by Dutch modern-realistic artists, especially painters. Melchers acquired a large part of the collection by purchasing the DS Art Collection from the estate of the DSB Bank after this bank had gone bankrupt.

The collection consists of works by, among others, Carel Willink, Jan Mankes, Pyke Koch, Dick Ket, Raoul Hynckes, Wim Schuhmacher, Charley Toorop, Jan Beutener, Co Westerik, Barend Blankert, Philip Akkerman, Erwin Olaf and Annemarie Busschers.

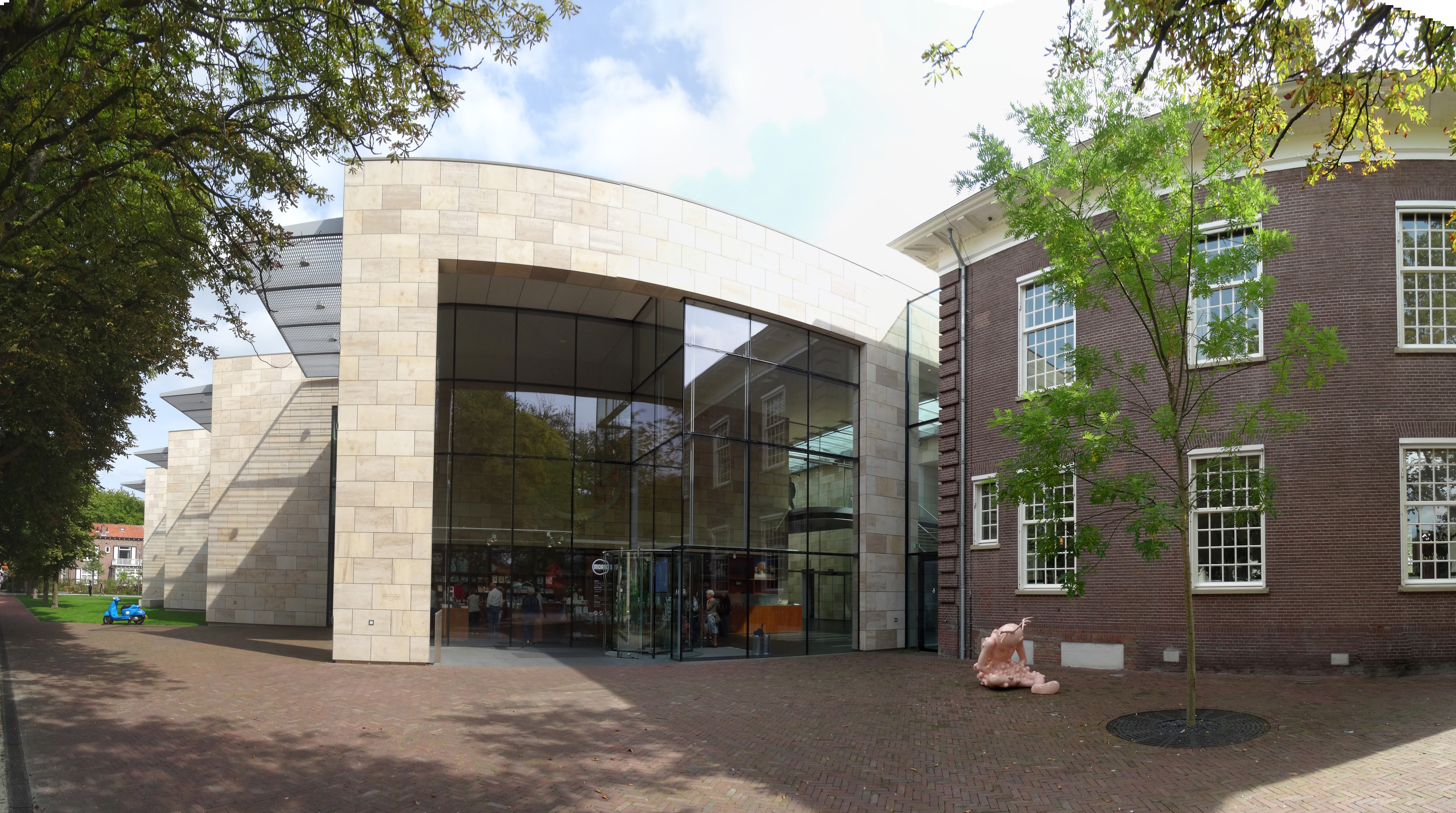
Museum, entrance

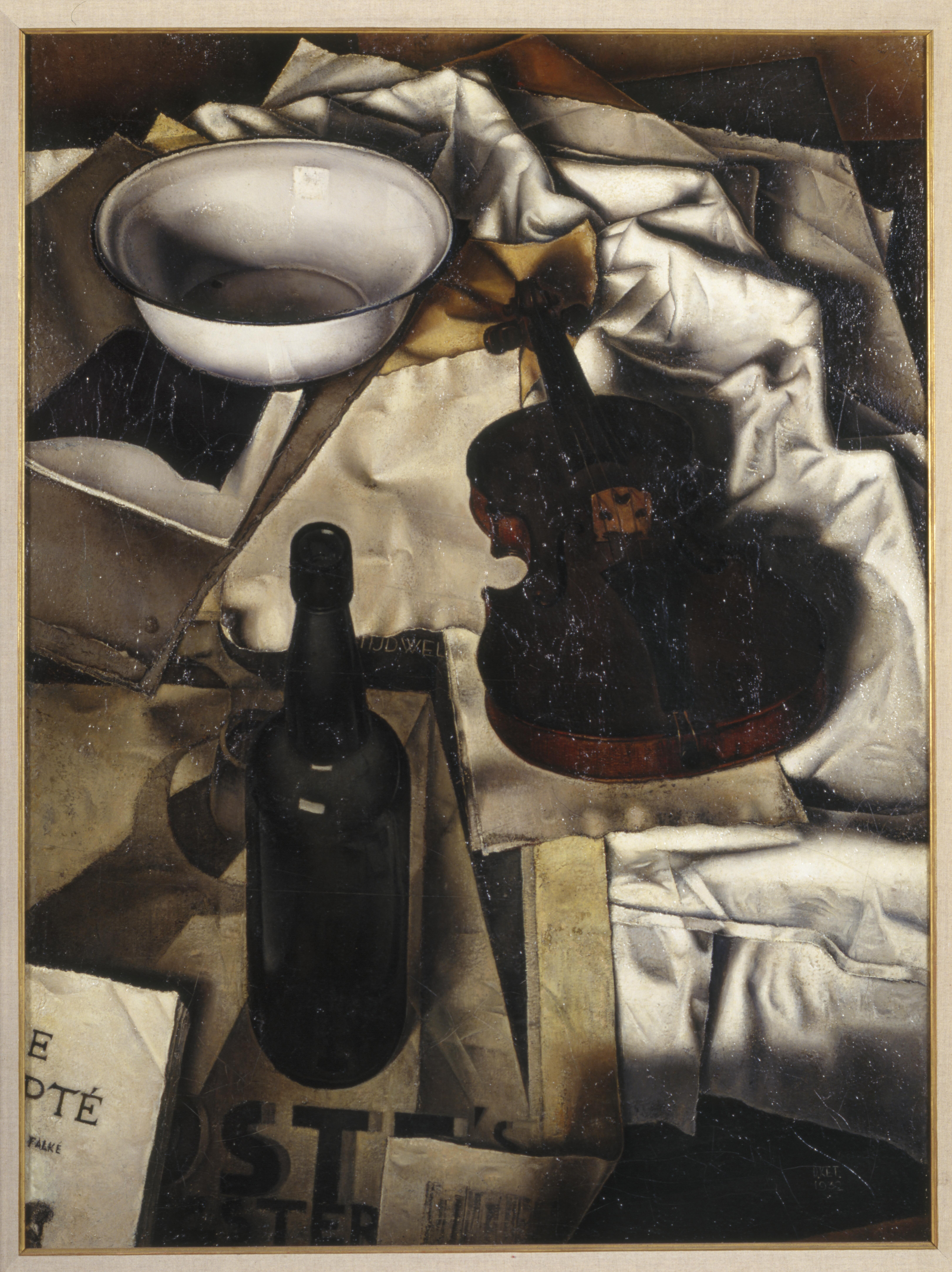
Still life with violin
(Dick Ket)

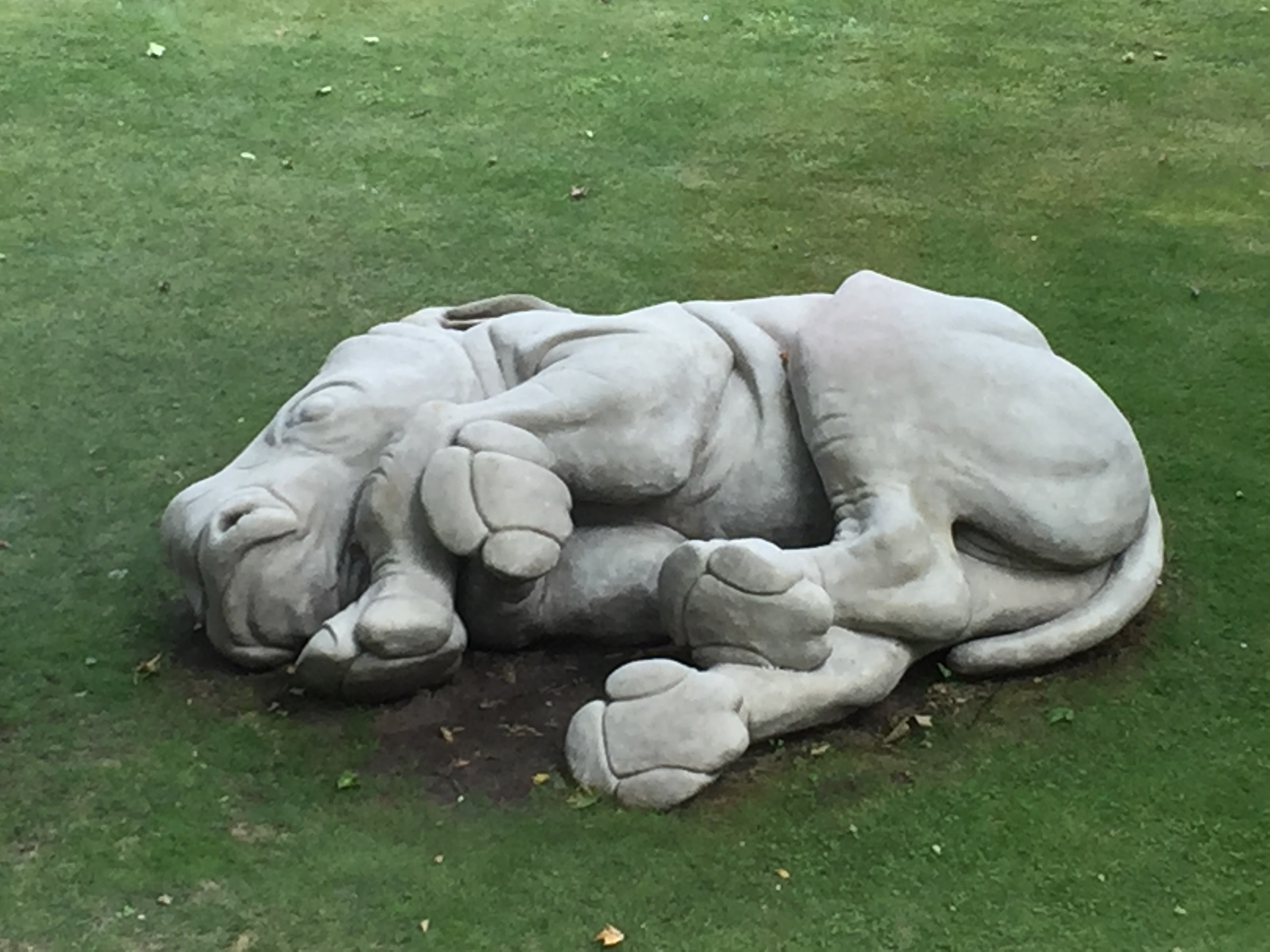
Ortus
(Miriam Knibbeler)

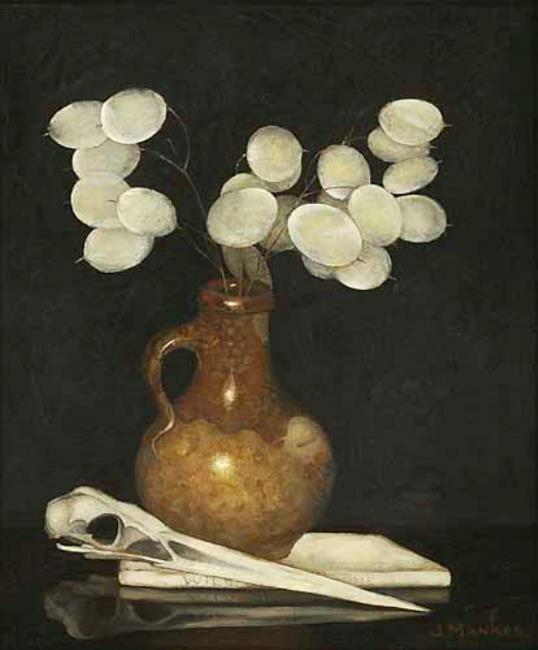
Kruikje met judaspenning
(Jan Mankes)

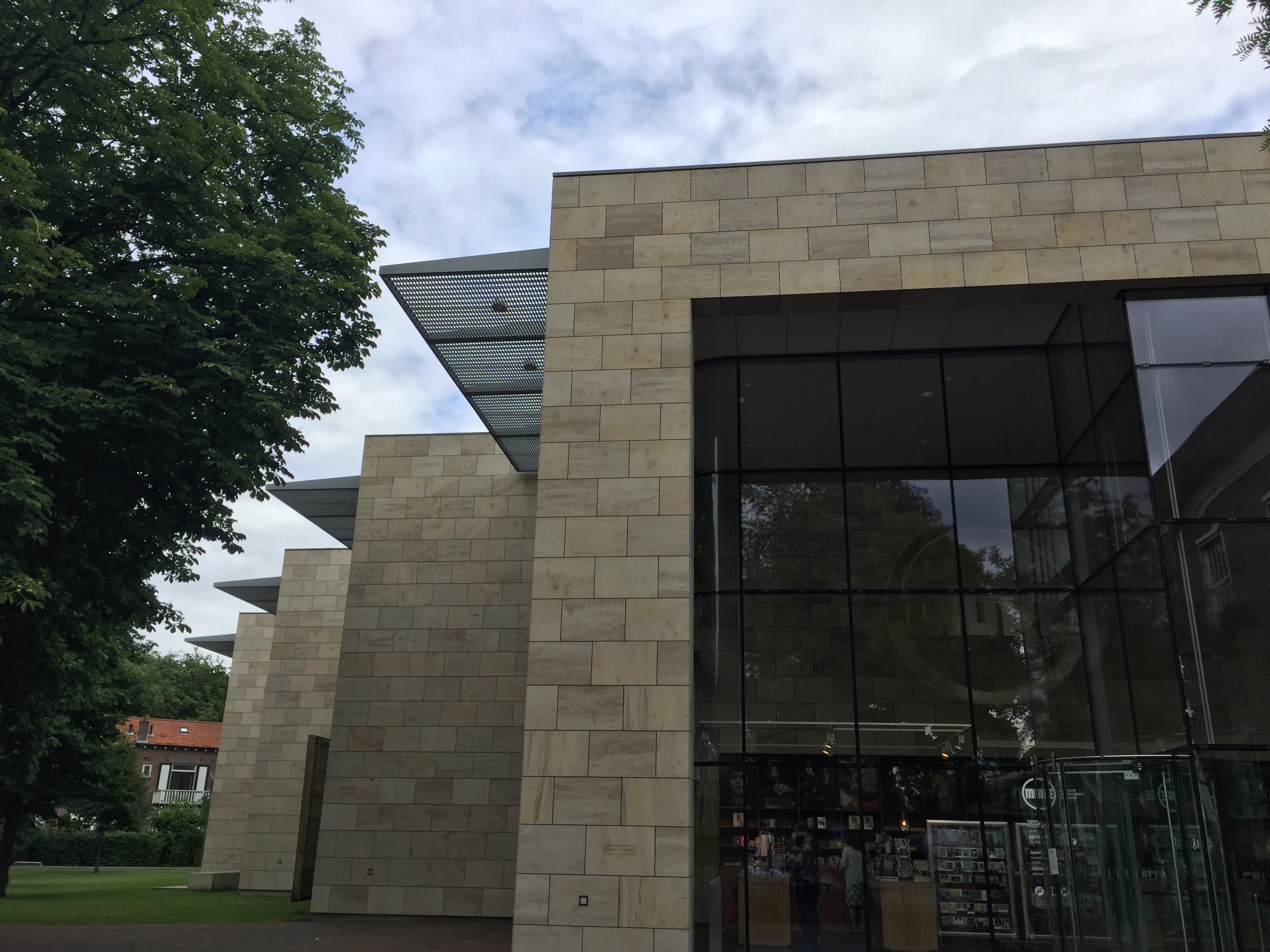
Museum building
