= DSB Bank =

Dutch bank and insurer

DSB Bank NV

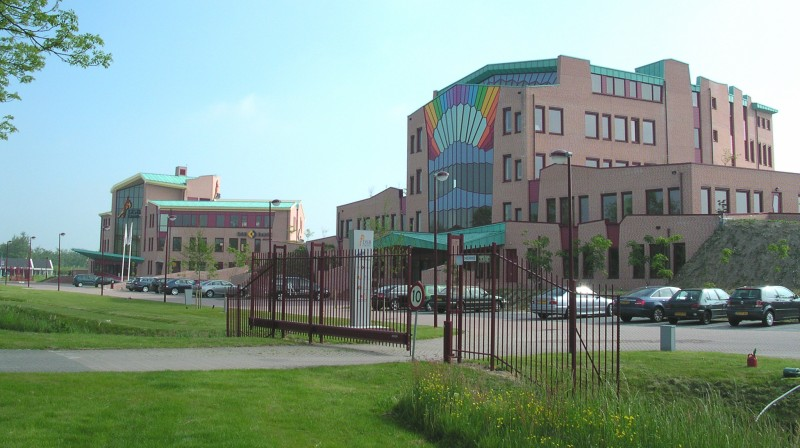
- Company type: Naamloze Vennootschap
- Industry: Financial services
- Founded: 1975
- Fate: Declared bankrupt by a Dutch court on 19 October 2009.
- Headquarters: Wognum, Netherlands
- Key people: Dirk Scheringa; Founder & Owner R.J Schimmelpenninck; Bankruptcy Trustee B.FM. Knuppe; Bankruptcy Trustee
- Products: Banking; Insurance; Credit
- Revenue: ▲€84.28 million (2017)
- Net income: ▲€104.6 million (2017)
- Number of employees: 30 (2017)
- Website: www.dsbbank.nl

DSB Bank (DSB: Dirk Scheringa Beheer) was a Dutch bank and insurer that failed in 2009. Its loans were managed under Quion from June 2013 until June 2016 when Finqus began operating as the former DSB Bank. In 2018 Finqus BV took over DSB Bank and operated as a subsidiary of DSB Group. Finqus BV turned over its loan portfolio to NIBC Bank on 21 July 2021.

The company was founded in 1975 by Dirk Scheringa, the sole shareholder. It was originally called Buro Frisia, but in 1998 the DSB Groep (English: DSB Group) was founded which included Buro Frisia. The bank made the news several times, due to, among numerous things, overpriced mortgages and deferred annuities. On 19 October 2009, the Amsterdam court declared DSB Bank to be in bankruptcy. Currently all bank services are active. No new loan applications are being accepted, and providing advice for payment services has also stopped.

== History ==
Dirk Scheringa, a former police officer, founded DSB BANK as Buro Frisia in 1975. In 1977 the company had capital worth €25 million and a balance of €300 million, due to stable growth and acquisitions. During the end of the 90s, Scheringa wanted to take his company to the market, the company was estimated to be worth 400 million at the time. However, right before the IPO, Scheringa decided not to through with it, since he supposedly did not agree with the introduction price.

He thus remained sole shareholder and found new ways to attract capital. He did so by creating subordinated debt to add to his capital. Such a debt is a loan which ranks after other debts should a company fall into liquidation or bankruptcy. Such debt is referred to as subordinate, because the debt providers (the lenders) have subordinate status in relationship to the normal debt. DSB bank went through some structural changes and changed its name to DSB Bank NV in 2006. Unlike most other banks, DSB bank's main source of profit was provision revenues from premiums and term life insurance, which were sold simultaneously with the loans. This form of combined sale is prohibited in the Netherlands, but no action was taken until 2009.

In June 2007, Scheringa appointed Gerrit Zalm as chief economist and chief financial officer to succeed the outgoing CFO Jaap van Dijk who had been with DSB from 2002 until November 2007. In November 2008, Zalm left DSB, took a job with ABN AMRO, and was succeeded as CFO at DSB from March 2009 to May 2009 by Frank de Grave. In July 2009, Ronald Buwalda, another member of VVD became CFO at DSB.

== Activities ==
DSB bank provided mortgages and consumer loans, savings and insurance products to individuals. In the Netherlands, DSB bank had a market share of approximately 17% in the supply of private credit. DSB bank had various trade names, such as Becam, Frisia Financieringen, Lenen.nl en Postkrediet.

Dirk Scheringa owned the professional Dutch football club AZ Alkmaar and DSB Bank was the main sponsor of the football club. The bank also sponsored a lot of other sports clubs. Next to that Dirk Scheringa opened the Scheringa Museum for Realism in 1997. Dirk Scheringa had over the years acquired a large collection of paintings, mostly Dutch (Koch, Ket, Willink a.o.) in the magical-realistic genre, with the intention of creating a permanent exhibit in the museum. DSB bank ensured that it was known by creating a lot of television advertisements, unlike other banks in the Netherlands. These commercials were often chosen as ‘most annoying advertisement of the year’, but did provide them with the reputation of a cheap and safe bank. Their slogan was: DSB bank, good for you money.

== Causes of bankruptcy ==
=== Overpriced mortgages ===
DSB bank sold mortgages jointly with term life insurance and made their customers pay these simultaneously, which is highly unusual, and illegal in the Netherlands. They charged very high premiums, sometimes 80% of the price of the purchase. This caused the mortgages to be overpriced e.g. the mortgage was worth, sometimes 46% more, than the actual value of the property, instead of the 25% threshold. Customers could only get the mortgage if they paid the term insurance simultaneously. They were drawn by the low interest rates, however these rates often increased within a year, increasing the pressure on the obligations of the customers. Customers that wanted to leave DSB had difficulty doing so, since no other bank wanted to take over their risky mortgages. Therefore, customers had no choice but to sell their house and accept the high remaining debt they were stuck with afterwards.

=== Fines ===
As this practice of providing mortgages came to light, the DSB bank received two fines from the Dutch Authority of Financial Markets. One for overpricing their credit and one for the lack of information given to customers with a combined value of €120.000^{10}.

=== Damage Claims ===
In 2009, several support funds were created to inform potential clients about the way DSB conducted business. There also were mediation parties to help the duped customers.

=== Bank run ===
In 2009, the run on the DSB bank started when Pieter Lakeman, the representative of unsatisfied DSB-customers of the foundation ‘Hypotheekleed’ (roughly translated as: mortgage distress), motivated depositors at the DSB bank to withdraw their money. According to Lakeman it would be better for the depositors if the bank went bankrupt, due to the provision of frowned upon mortgages. Already on the same day, depositors withdrew 88 million euro, from their bank accounts at the DSB bank, followed by 100 million euro on 2 October 2009 and 127 million euro on 3 October. On 12 October, all accounts at the DSB bank were frozen on request of the Dutch central bank, the DNB (De Nederlandse Bank), in order to stop the bank run which could lead to the failure of the DSB bank. At that point, more than 600 million euros had already been withdrawn, which was a sign for DNB that the Solvency of the DSB bank was under pressure. The deposit insurance program still guaranteed the deposits at the DSB bank to an amount of 100.000 euros per account.

According to the Dutch Ministry of Finance, this regulation was inevitable. In the days before the implementation of this regulation, the government, DNB and a group of five banks tried to come up with a solution for the DSB bank, but the risks of this operation were perceived too high and eventually the whole operation was cancelled.

== Effects of the bankruptcy ==
=== Reactions ===
‘We did not go bankrupt, we were destroyed’ were the words of DSB bank owner Dirk Scheringa. Together with the board of directors he publicly asked for a parliamentary poll about DSB bank's bankruptcy. According to him it was necessary to investigate how the government could turn a totally healthy company into a failing company. Dirk Scheringa blamed the ministry of Finance, DNB and the media for the bankruptcy. Firstly, the ministry of Finance stated that the DSB bank charged idiotic provisions, but according to Scheringa a lot of other banks charged the same amounts. Secondly, DNB requirements for DSB were far too stringent and totally uncalled for. Thirdly, the media spread the news about a possible takeover of the DSB bank by DNB before the official report was published, this led to massive withdrawals by depositors. Dirk Scheringa promised to resign as chairman and to sell his shares, nevertheless DNB decided to let the DSB bank go bankrupt.

=== Final attempts to save the bank ===
During the weekend of 17 October the final attempts to save the DSB bank were presented on television by financial advisor Adrian Dorrepaal under the title ‘Plan B’. He called in the help of 8,500 depositors who accounted for a total of 250 million euro and did not fall under the deposit insurance scheme. Since these depositors would lose their money in case of bankruptcy it was better for them to turn their deposits into shares of the DSB bank. According to Dorrepaal such a transformation would be sufficient to avoid bankruptcy. Once the DSB bank recovered, the depositors would get their money back through dividends. That weekend Dirk Scheringa was working with Gardner Ross Corp. on a possible takeover bid from the American investment company 'Lone Star Funds’. When Lone Star Fund stated not to be interested anymore, Plan B was Dirk Scheringa's last resort. He had until 9 a.m. on 19 October to come up with a solution, otherwise the Court of Amsterdam would declare DSB Bank bankrupt. Already before the deadline Plan B was rejected by the government, which considered the plan too complicated and risk bearing. Besides that, the government believed that the plan would have little positive effects on the liquidity of the DSB bank.

=== The effects on sponsorships ===
After the bankruptcy of the DSB bank all sponsoring was stopped.

On 13 October all sponsorship towards the DSB bank's ice-skating team was shut down. This happened in the middle of a training camp in Germany, this led to the situation where the ice-skaters themselves had to pay for the rent of the ice-skating track and the transportation back home.

On 30 October the official sponsorship of AZ Alkmaar came to an end. All associations with the bank in and around the stadium were removed. At that time, AZ Alkmaar was the national titleholder. A part of the revenues of the new sponsorship deal with AFAS Software would accrue to the creditors of DSB bank, since AZ Alkmaar had an open debt of 14 million euro at the DSB bank.

=== Effects on museum ===
On 17 November the court of Alkmaar declared DS Art, which encompasses Dirk Scheringa's art collection, bankrupt. Sixteen employees of the museum in Spanbroek were fired. At that time Dirk Scheringa was building a new museum in Opmeer. ABN Amro impounded 1300 art pieces to serve as collateral for DSB Bank's mortgage-debt of 32 million euro. In March 2012, retired Dutch businessman Hans Melchers bought the bulk of this collection in a deal with Deutsche Bank, who were curator. Melchers is currently looking for a good location to make these paintings (over 1000) available to the public.

== See also ==
- List of banks in the Netherlands
