= The Zeppelin =

1933 painting by Carel Willink

- De zeppelin (Dutch)
- Artist: Carel Willink
- Year: 1933
- Medium: Oil on canvas
- Dimensions: 75 cm × 100 cm (30 in × 39 in)
- Location: Museum MORE; Gorssel

The Zeppelin (Dutch: De zeppelin) is a 1933 painting by the Dutch painter Carel Willink. It shows a street corner where four men look up to the sky and wave to a zeppelin.

== Subject and composition ==
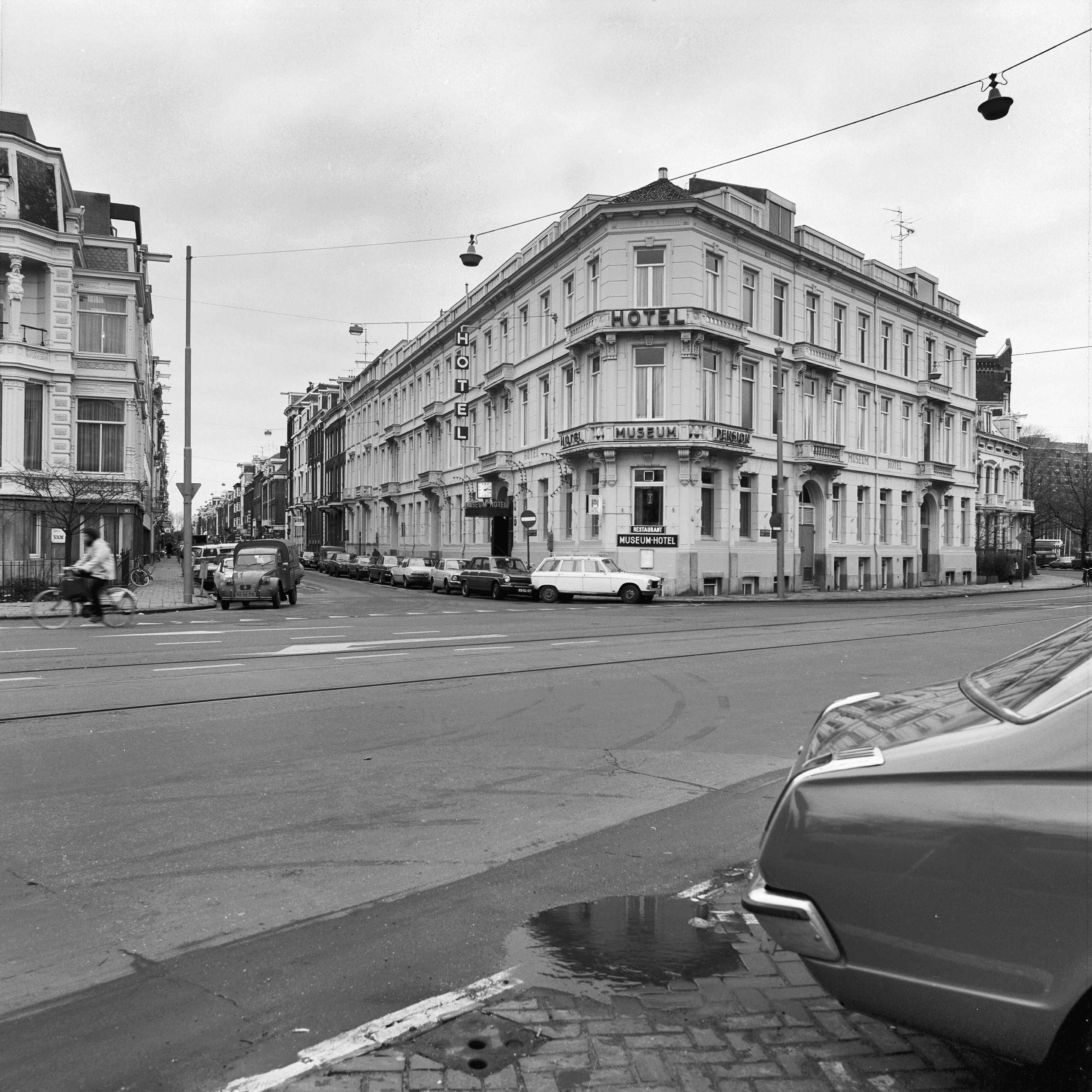
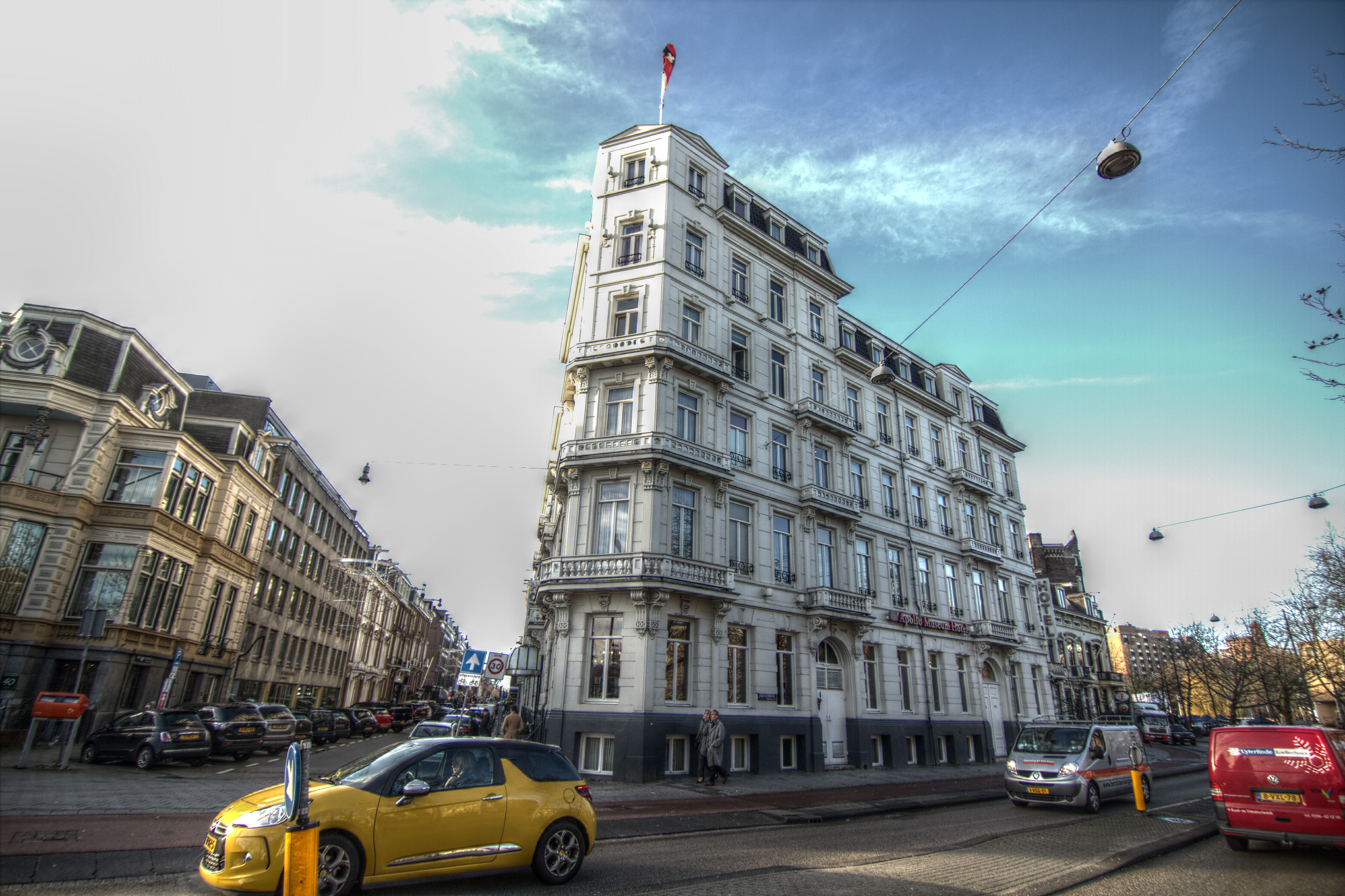
The corner of Stadhouderskade and P.C. Hooftstraat in 1978 and 2015

The Zeppelin shows a zeppelin in the air, seen from a street corner where four men look to the sky and wave. The airship is the LZ 127 Graf Zeppelin, a German zeppelin that flew over Amsterdam on 14 October 1929. Willink created his painting The Zeppelin four years later. The location is the corner of the streets Stadhouderskade and P.C. Hooftstraat in Amsterdam.

== Reception and provenance ==
After the outbreak of World War II, The Zeppelin was sometimes interpreted as prophetic, as it had been made the same year Adolf Hitler came to power and the zeppelin could be seen as a symbol for Germany. Willink was however unwilling to comment on any such interpretation, instead explaining: "The heart of my work is a deadly love for reality".

The Zeppelin is owned by the businessman Hans Melchers. It is on public display at the Museum MORE in Gorssel.

The Zeppelin was the inspiration behind the electronic music track "The Zeppelin" by René van der Wouden, made for the 2011 compilation album Dutch Masters initiated by Synth.nl. After this Wouden produced an entire album themed around zeppelins.
