= To the Future =

Painting by Carel Willink

- Naar de toekomst (Dutch)
- Artist: Carel Willink
- Year: 1965
- Medium: Oil on canvas
- Dimensions: 109 cm × 150 cm (43 in × 59 in)
- Location: Museum MORE; Gorssel

To the Future (Dutch: Naar de toekomst) is a painting made by the Dutchman Carel Willink in 1965. It shows two sculptures from the Garden of Bomarzo and a man in an asbestos suit who walks toward a large explosion. It belongs to a group of late Willink paintings that portray apocalyptic confrontations between modern technology and the ancient world. To the Future is in the collection of Museum MORE in the Netherlands.

== Subject and composition ==
The setting for To the Future is a plain and barren landscape under ominous clouds. At the front to the left is a sculpture of a dragon fighting two lions and further back in the middle is a sculpture of a monstrous head with an open mouth. To the right is a man in an asbestos suit, seen from the back as he walks toward the smoke pillar of a large explosion. In the background is a stairset leading to an octagonal temple, in front of which a building element is collapsing forward.

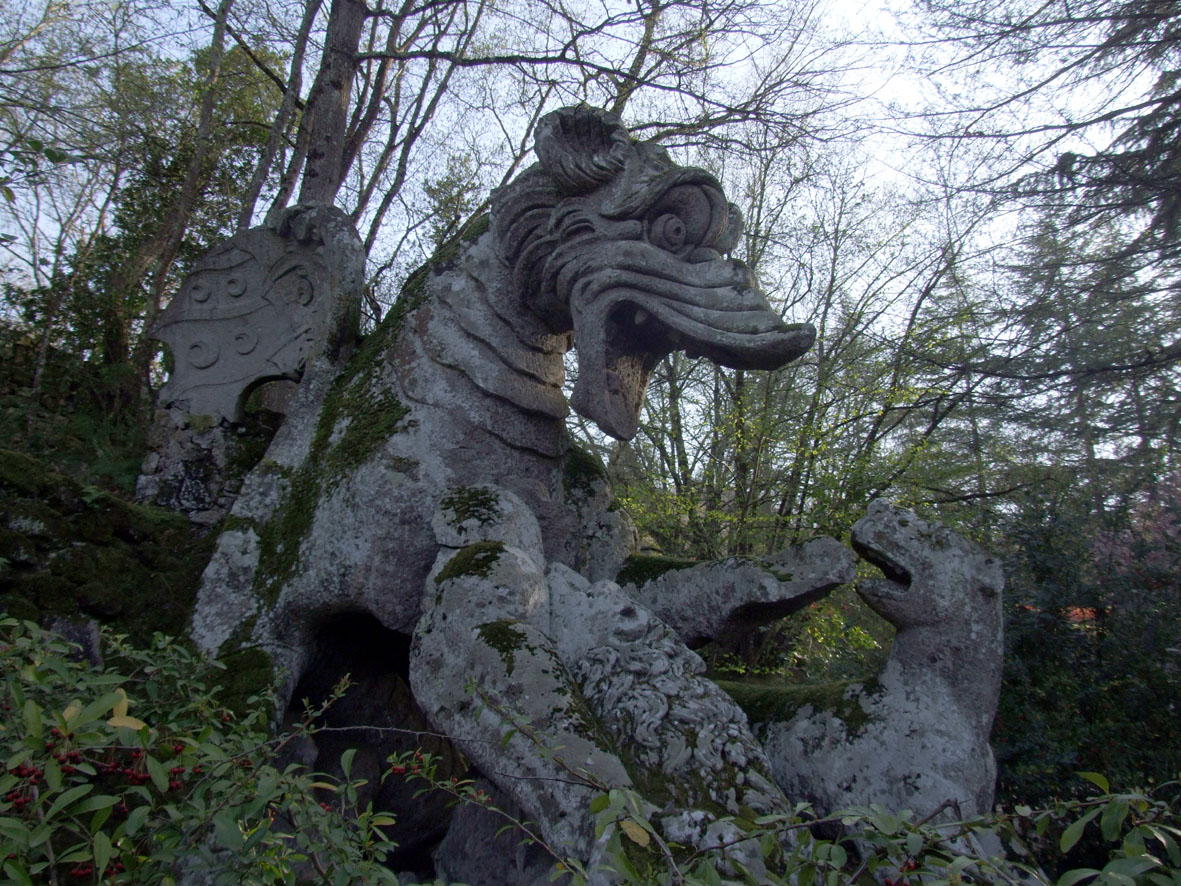
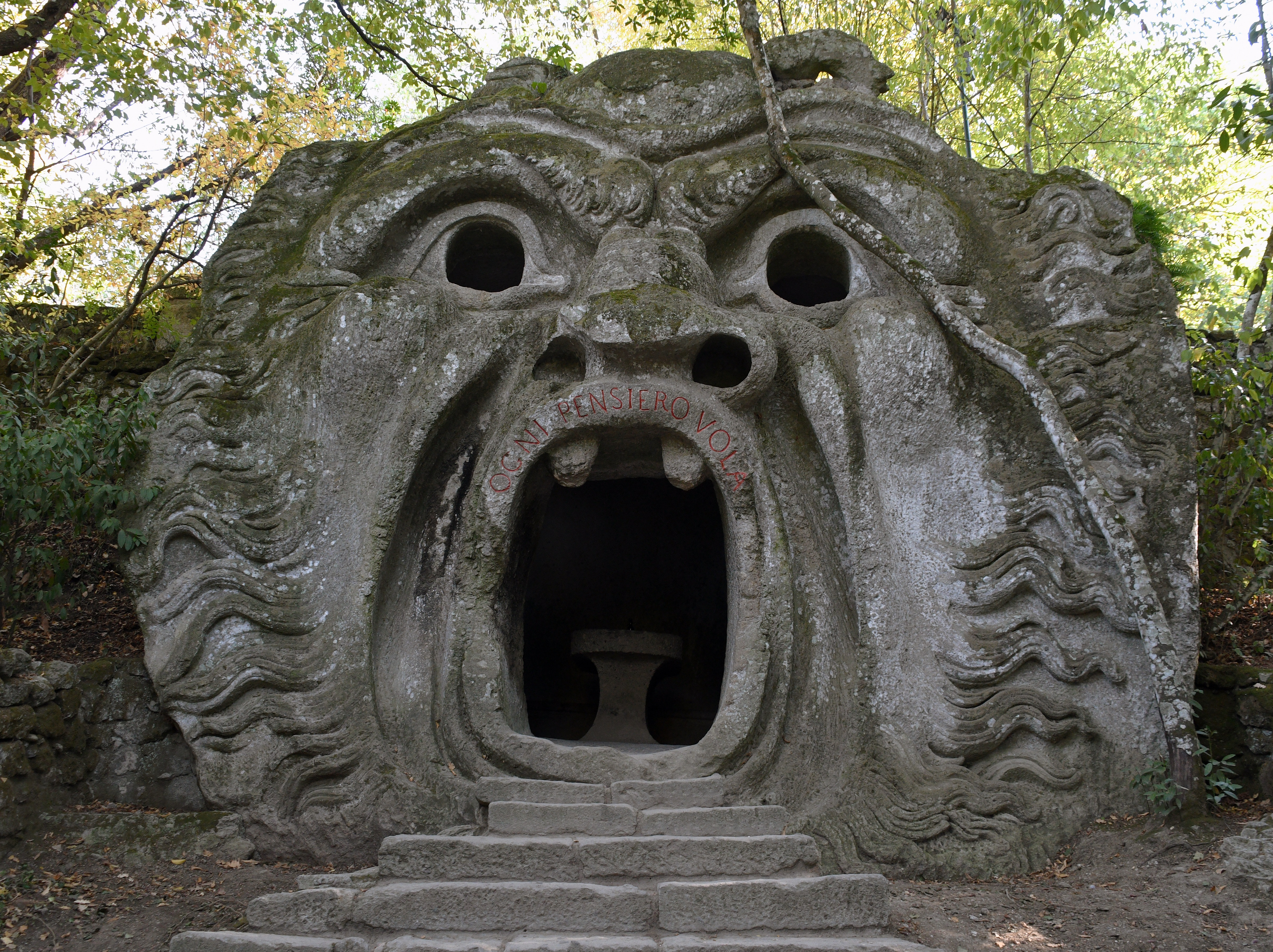
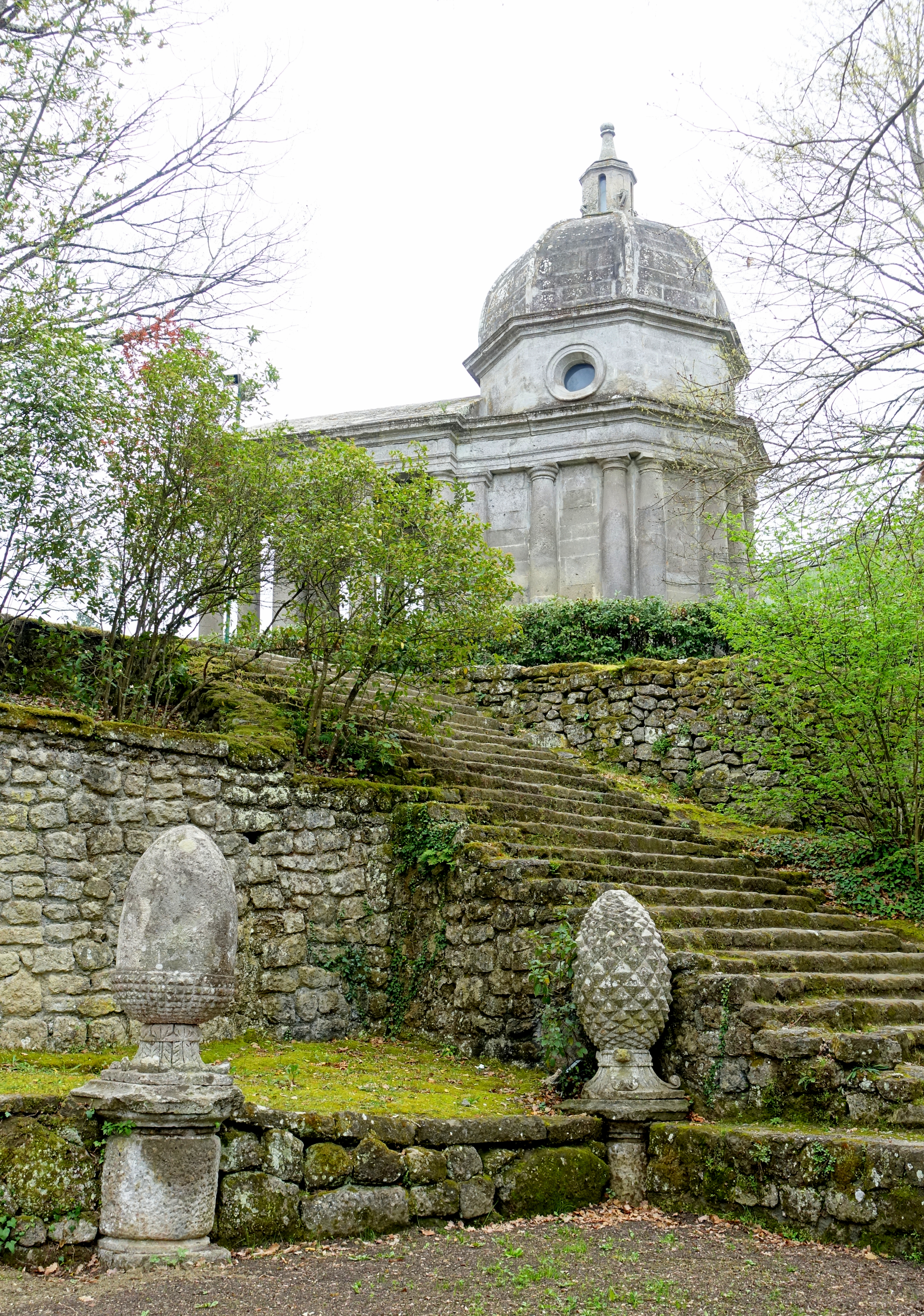
Three components in To the Future are from the Garden of Bomarzo: a dragon sculpture, an Orcus sculpture and a temple.

The sculptures exist in the Garden of Bomarzo, a 16th-century park located north of Rome. The temple is likewise based on a building in the park, but the collapsing part is from a 1937 news photograph of the Rotunde in Vienna, which was demolished with explosives after it was destroyed in a fire. The man in the asbestos suit is also based on a photograph. Willink painted To the Future in oil in 1965. The canvas has the dimensions 109 cm × 150 cm (43 in × 59 in).

== Analysis and reception ==
To the Future belongs to Willink's last phase as a painter which began in the 1960s. It is one of 19 paintings from this period that depict a confrontation between modern civilization and the ancient world, and where modern science and warfare are portrayed in apocalyptic scenarios. A source of inspiration was Oswald Spengler's book The Decline of the West, which Willink read as a student and from which he adapted the theme of a dying Western culture and a view of progress as a bringer of decline. Willink's fascination with the Garden of Bomarzo began when he saw pictures of it in the book Die Welt als Labyrinth (1957) by Gustav René Hocke. He visited and photographed the park in 1960 and 1962, and sculptures from it appear in several of his paintings from the mid-1960s and onwards, usually under threatening skies and together with alienating elements.

The art historian Michiel Koolbergen said To the Future is the painting that best shows Willink's view of human self-destruction. Koolbergen described the statues as passive witnesses to a humanity that has suppressed its own power and appears in a protective suit. He made a comparison with Willink's Bomarzo painting The Eternal Cry (1964), in which the destruction happens behind the horizon, and wrote that only in To the Future is it explicit why the sculptures look upset, because "the world fire" actually is seen.

== Provenance ==
To the Future is also known as Towards the Future. It is part of Museum MORE's collection of Dutch modern realist paintings in Gorssel, Lochem municipality. The Stedelijk Museum Amsterdam owns a preliminary study. A pencil study is in the collection of the Rijksmuseum in Amsterdam.
