= Claudia Melchers =

Dutch businesswoman

- Born: 6 May 1969 (age 57); Ruurlo, Netherlands
- Occupation: Head of the CMC Catering Company
- Known for: Kidnapping victim
- Parent: Hans Melchers

Claudia Melchers (born 6 May 1969, Ruurlo) is the Dutch head of a cooking company called CMC Catering, known for her kidnapping in September 2005. She is the daughter of Hans Melchers, a wealthy Dutch businessman.

== Kidnapping ==
On 12 September 2005, a group of three armed South-American men broke into her home in Amsterdam, tied her, packed her into a plastic crate, and then forced her into a waiting vehicle. The intruders left her two children unharmed. They also bound and gagged a male neighbour present at the time, but her children freed the neighbour shortly before police arrived.

The abductors took Melchers to a bungalow park in the eastern part of the Netherlands. She was held captive in one of the bungalows. After the case got so much media attention, Melchers was dropped off unharmed at the Arnhem train station within 48 hours. No reason was given for her release, and it is unclear whether a ransom was paid.

The abductors reportedly demanded 660 pounds (300 kilograms) of cocaine. After the release of this fact, several Dutch Radio and Television stations speculated that the reason for the kidnapping was an error with a drug deal and that the abductors were in quick need of cocaine. The stations claimed that they got their information from the police. The above-mentioned media also speculated that Melchers' family is involved in the drug scene. Melchers' father - Hans Melchers - denied any of these connections and announced that he was going to sue several newspapers and television programs that launched this rumour.

The kidnapping happened a month after the Dutch authorities' largest drug bust till that date at the Port of Rotterdam (4,500 kilograms of cocaine). A connection between the abductors and the drug bust case was initially speculated though never clearly established.

== Criminal proceedings ==
Several people were prosecuted for their involvement in the kidnapping. In November 2006, three defendants received prison sentences ranging from two to six years. Lorenzo Moeniralam, one of the abductors of Melchers, was sentenced to eight years in prison in 2007. Later that year his nephew Izaan M. was sentenced to ten years. Three others involved earlier received prison sentences from 2 to 6 years.

In December 2008, the Amsterdam Court of Appeal sentenced both Lorenzo and Izaan Moeniralam to eight years in prison. The court distinguished between Lorenzo's role in planning the kidnapping and Izaan's role in its execution.

In March 2010, Izaan Moeniralam discussed the kidnapping in an interview with the Amsterdam television station AT5, expressing regret over the crime and describing mistakes made during its execution.

== Later reporting ==
In April 2012, the Dutch hospitality trade publication Misset Horeca published articles identifying Melchers as the owner of CMC Catering and reporting on her experiences following the kidnapping. In an interview, she discussed fears about her personal safety that had preceded the abduction.

== See also ==
Other famous kidnappings in the Netherlands are:

- Freddy Heineken (1983)
- Gerrit Jan Heijn (1987)
- Derk Bolt (2017)
