= Wilma with Cat =

1940 painting by Carel Willink

- Wilma met kat (Dutch)
- Artist: Carel Willink
- Year: 1940
- Medium: Oil on canvas
- Dimensions: 108 cm × 84.3 cm (43 in × 33.2 in)
- Location: Museum Arnhem; Arnhem

Wilma with Cat (Dutch: Wilma met kat) is a portrait of Wilma Willink, painted by her husband Carel Willink in 1940. Wilma is depicted in a half-length portrait with a cat in her arms and a colonnade in the background. The cat, whose name was Negus, was euthanised shortly after the painting was made.

Associated with magical realism, Wilma with Cat has been praised for its technical accomplishment. Museum Arnhem purchased it in 1960. Since 2021, there has been a large reproduction of the painting on a house façade in Arnhem.

== Background ==
Wilma Willink (1905–1960), born Jeuken, was the second wife of the Dutch painter Carel Willink (1900–1983). The two met in 1930 and married in 1933. Carel was very fond of her and painted her several times.

At the outbreak of World War II, the Willinks owned two cats, Negus—who was named after an honorary title of Haile Selassie—and Petertje. When food became expensive during the war, they could only afford to keep one cat. Because of Negus' large size and out of respect for the writer Menno ter Braak, who was Petertje's former owner and who committed suicide during the German invasion of the Netherlands, they chose to euthanise Negus.

== Subject and composition ==
Wilma with Cat (Dutch: Wilma met kat) was made in 1940. It is painted in oil on canvas and has the dimensions 108 cm × 84.3 cm (42.5 in × 33.2 in). Wilma is shown in half-length portrait and looks toward the viewer. She wears a checkered jacket and holds a cat with black and white fur. She leans lightly against the plinth of a statue. In the background is a dark marble floor and a lighter colonnade.

The cat is the Willinks' cat Negus. Wilma was very fond of Negus who is seen with her in many photographs. Wilma with Cat was completed shortly before Negus's death.

== Reception ==
The art critic Bob Witman groups Wilma with Cat with Willink's paintings leading up to 1940. Witman says these are Willink's most appealing works, made when he definitely had abandoned his early interest in abstraction and developed a magic realism that omits psychology. Witman calls Wilma with Cat "Willink at his best". He highlights its composition and the technical accomplishment in the way the jacket's fabric and the cat are painted.

== Provenance ==
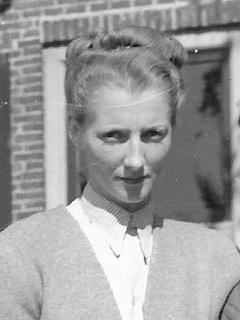
Wilma Willink

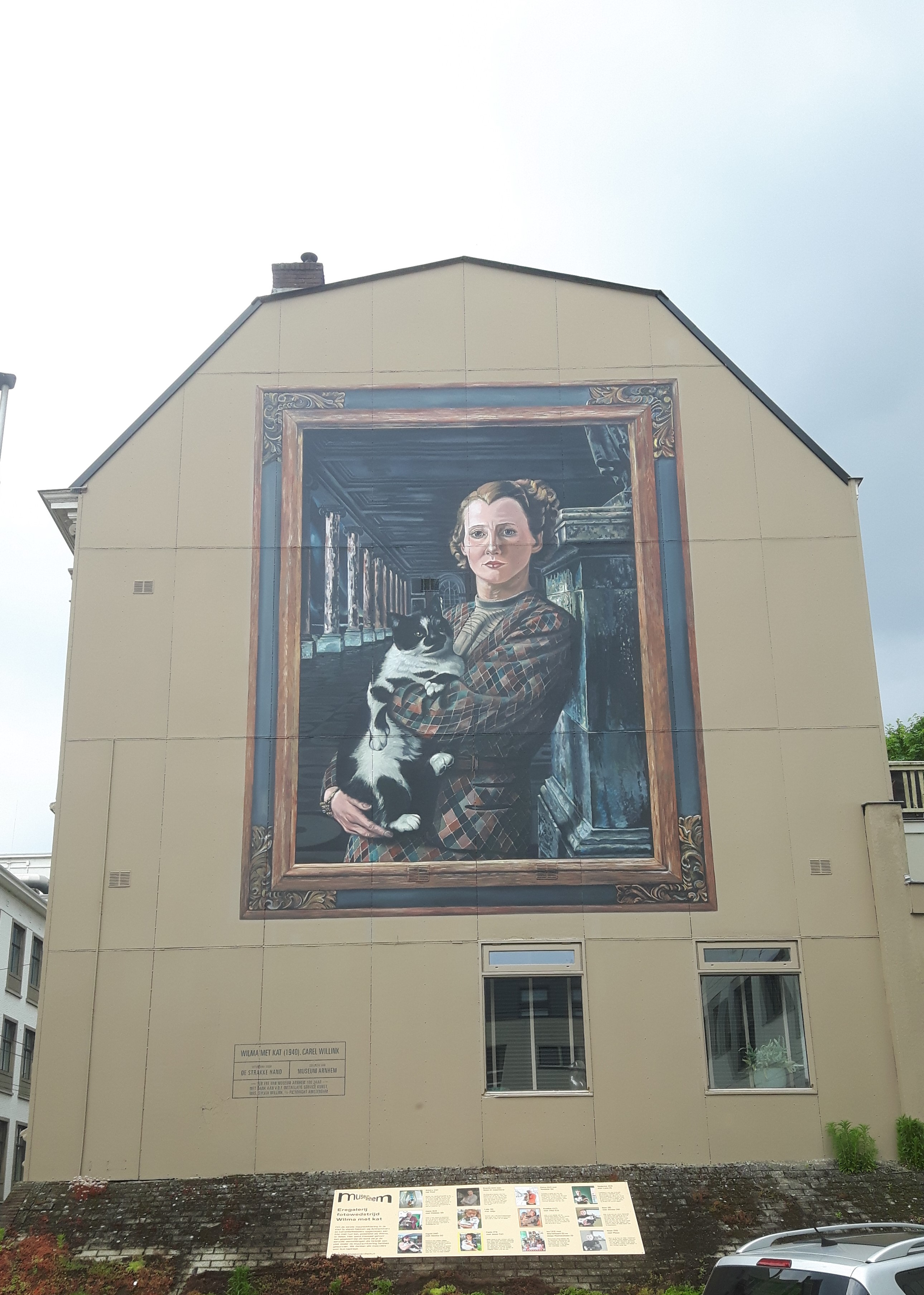
Mural with photo contest winners at the bottom

Wilma with Cat is in the collection of Museum Arnhem in Arnhem, the Netherlands. The museum bought it at auction on 24 May 1960, one month after Wilma's death from an intracerebral hemorrhage. Rijksmuseum in Amsterdam owns a pencil sketch for the painting.

For Museum Arnhem's 100th anniversary in 2021, and to compensate for being closed for renovation, the museum reproduced several of its paintings as giant murals in public places in Arnhem. Wilma with Cat was the first painting to receive this treatment. (Note: It was followed by similarly sized reproductions of Still Life with Cello (1924) by Raoul Hynckes, Self-portrait (1957) by Henk Mual and Still Life with Flowers and Fruits (1927) by Charley Toorop.) The museum selected it by asking the public to name the most beautiful painting in its collection.

The mural is located on a house façade at Utrechtsestraat 54, on the way between the Arnhem Centraal railway station and Museum Arnhem. It is seven by five metres (23 ft × 16 ft) and was painted with brushes by De Strekke Hand, a group of twelve painters who specialise in large-scale public reproductions of paintings. At the completion of the mural, Museum Arnhem organised a photo contest where people in Arnhem were asked to pose like Wilma with their own cats. The winning photographs were exhibited below the mural.
