= Francesco Stella =

Italian painter

Francesco Stella (Italian pronunciation: [frаnˈtʃesko ˈstella]; 1862–1940) was an Italian set designer, artist-painter, and decorator.

Stella was born in Rome and studied art in his hometown under the guidance of teacher Luigi Alessandro Bazzani. He went to Argentina in 1897, and was hired to perform the wall decorations at the private residence of then President of the Republic, José Evaristo Uriburu. Later he decorated the churches of San Carlos and Our Lady of Sion, in Buenos Aires, and Our Lady of the Rosary (now Cathedral) in Santa Fe.

Stella was noted as an artist who traveled, who made different art-works in Spain, Greece, and Egypt, etc. Approximately between 1911 and 1924 he was engaged by the Teatro Colón of Buenos Aires, where he performed a scenographic work as an artist and set-designer for various performances of opera and ballet.

He was father of Ugo Stella (1891–1953), the Italian designer and restorer of historic buildings. He died in 1940 in Buenos Aires.
