= Dušan Otašević =

Serbian artist

Dušan Otašević (Serbian Cyrillic: Душан Оташевић, born 1940) is a Serbian artist.

== Biography ==
Otašević was born in Belgrade in what was then the Kingdom of Yugoslavia. He graduated from the Academy of Fine Arts, Belgrade in 1966. At first he was associated with "New Figuration" in Belgrade, turned to Pop-Art and produced sculptural objects. He currently lives in Belgrade.

Solo exhibitions and participations (selection):

- 1966 "New Figuration of Belgrade Circle", Gallery of the Cultural Centre, Belgrade.
- 1967 Gallery in the House of the Rising Generation, Belgrade.
- 1984 "Line", Gallery Sebastian, Belgrade.
- 1990 "Ilija Dimić", Gallery Sebastian, Belgrade.
- 1995 "Portrait", Gallery SANU, Belgrade.

== Works ==
=== Sangstrel - the portrait of the author (1975) ===
In this work, author Dušan Otašević using humorous and ironic contents and the authentic structure, demystifies the presentation of a painter-genius.

The “Sangstel — Portrait of the Painter”, was created for his solo show in Dubrovnik Gallery.

Because of that, the artist chose as the motif for his artwork the figure that gave the Gallery its name, iconographically directly taken over from Mantegna's painting (from the Louvre) showing St. Sebastian tied to a pole and dying from fatal stabs by numerous arrows. Still, the artist transformed the appropriated quotation into the portrait of the artist more closely defined with the unusual neologism – Sangstrel. Composed from three words: sang (blood in French), angstrom (or angstrom unit, after the Swedish physicist, measuring unit for light and other waves) and strel (or strela, an arow in Serbian; n.b. in Old English strael, now arrow) – this fictional, quasi technical term that reminds one of a kind of a semi cold weapon, is the signpost to Otašević's relationship towards the fixed phantasms about the character of a painter and his work.

The figure of St. Sebastian is not stabbed with arrows, but with thin rods representing the handles of painterly.

Brushes or pencils, and each of them is painted in one of the seven colors of the natural spectrum, placed in seven pattern squares lined along the inside of the frame. The length of each “arrow”, although arbitrarily defined, is set in such a way to conjure the wavelength of its colour. The shortest is the violet one as the col- our with the least number of angstroms and the longest is the red, with the most of angstroms.

Sangstrel is a hyperbolised myth about the internal traumas of a painterly genius, an individual chosen by mystical powers who is bleeding his creation.

Standing on the borderline from where the belief in the “romantic stereotype of the artistic sublime being is dissolved, Otašević does not enter the field of sarcasm, nor does he push his work into a grotesque.
