= Pyke Koch =

Dutch painter

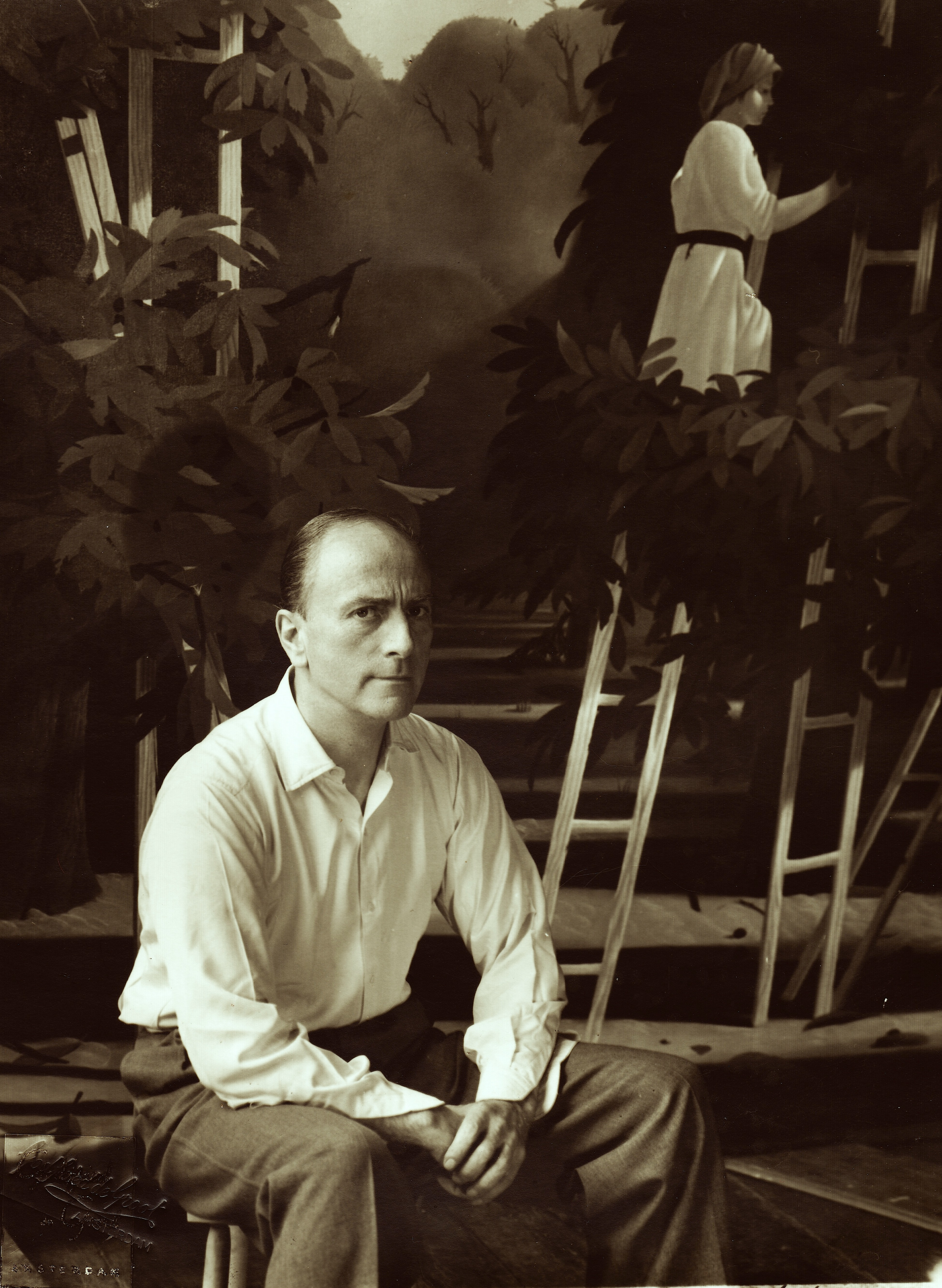
Pyke Koch (1955)

Pieter Frans Christiaan Koch, better known as Pyke Koch (July 15, 1901 – October 27, 1991), was a Dutch artist who painted in a magic realist manner.

Pyke Koch and the painter Carel Willink are considered to be the foremost representatives in the Netherlands of Magic Realism, a style of painting in which the scenes depicted seem realistic yet uncanny or unlikely.

His paintings show many details. Some art historians, notably Carel Blotkamp, have suggested that these details may contain hidden messages and references to his personal life. The work does contain many references to earlier periods in the history of art. He was very much inspired by painters of the Italian quattrocento, most notably the work of Piero della Francesca.

== Biography ==
=== Early life ===
Pyke Koch was born in Beek, a small village near Nijmegen in the Netherlands. He was the only son of the local doctor P.F.C. Koch; he had three elder sisters. He went to school first in Nijmegen, later to a boarding school in Zeist. There he was given the nickname Pike (as in the fish). The name stuck, even when he moved to Utrecht to study law at the University, although he changed the spelling to 'Pyke'.

Music was an important part of Koch family life. He played the violin and was interested in music from Bach to gypsy music. During his student days he played with a student gypsy band called Tzigane.

In the 1920s he met Charley Toorop who was already a famous painter. He probably became interested in painting through their friendship.

=== First steps ===
In the summer of 1927 Koch was slow in preparing for his final exams. By the time he was ready his professor had left the city for the summer. This left him with nothing to do and he found some brushes and paint that one of his sisters had given him years before. After he convinced a girl in a bar he was a professional painter, she modeled for him. The result was his first painting, called Dolores Ontbijt or Dolores' Breakfast. This first painting made an impression on the painter Cor Postma who arranged for Koch to be part of several exhibitions in the following years in the Stedelijk Museum in Amsterdam.

Strangely, from the very start his paintings were admired for their technical perfection, even though he had had no formal training. In fact he had had no practical training whatsoever. Koch was fond of his image as a self-taught painter. He did follow classes at the Arthistorical Institute of the University Utrecht where he studied the theories of art and even theories about art practices (the historical use of materials and such) but he never seems to have had lessons in drawing or painting.

He was most impressed with the painters of the Italian Renaissance Piero della Francesca, Masaccio and Andrea Mantegna. He also admired some modern painters, notably Chirico and Magritte.

At the Arthistorical Institute he met Hedwig (Heddy) de Geer, who became his wife in 1934. Afterwards they lived mainly in Utrecht.

=== Success ===
During the late 1920s and 1930s Koch had many exhibitions, both solo and in collaboration with others. In 1931 one of the foremost museums in the Netherlands, the Museum Boymans van Beuningen bought one of his paintings called De Schiettent or Shooting Gallery.

During the 1930s his work became very popular. It was often called Magic Realism, a term he quite liked.

His house in Utrecht (Oude Gracht 341) became a regular meeting place for many Dutch writers, painters and designers. His workplace, for instance, was remodeled by his friend Gerrit Rietveld.

Koch also had friendships outside of his artistic circle. One of these friends in particular would leave a permanent mark on his life. Ernst Voorhoeve was the founder of Verdinaso, a political movement that sympathised with Benito Mussolini's fascist movement. During the years he spent in Italy, where Heddy and Pyke had a bed & breakfast in Fiesole for a while, Koch started to admire Mussolini. Koch became a member of Verdinaso but renounced it when it merged with the Dutch Nazi party NSB. By that time, some of his paintings had appeared on the covers of magazines associated with fascism. This would prove to be a stain on his reputation that would stay with him for the rest of his life.

In those years Koch painted many masterpieces that were widely admired in exhibitions. He was also active as a designer for graphic work. He designed postage stamps and the Utrecht street lights.

He continued to work during the war. Like many of his colleagues he painted mostly still lifes because those were least likely to offend the Germans.

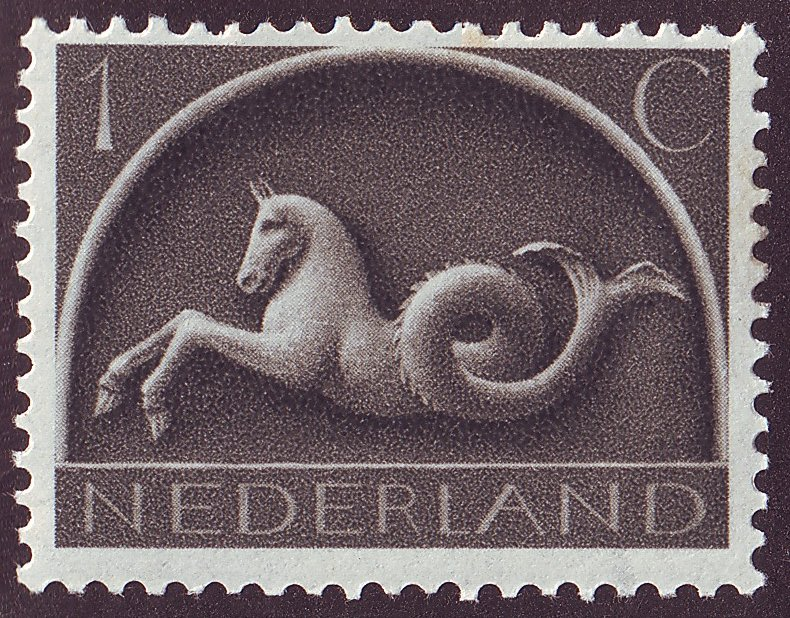
Water horse

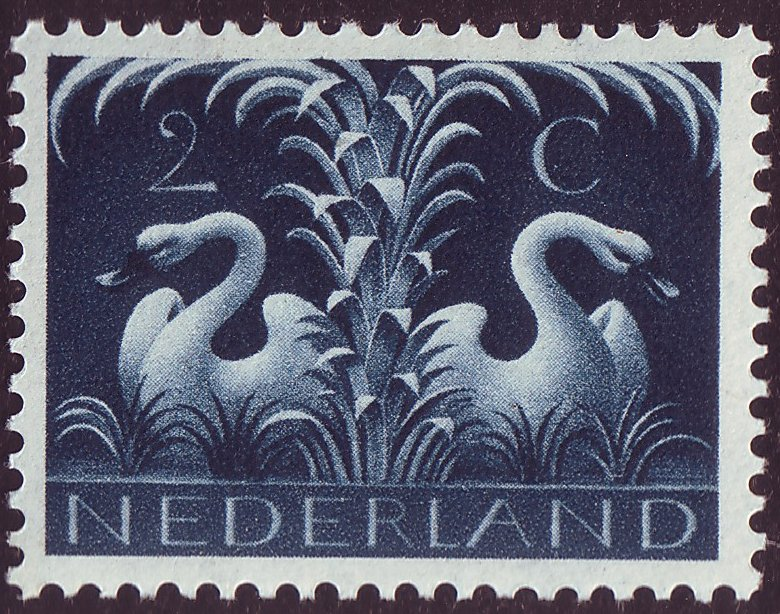
Swans

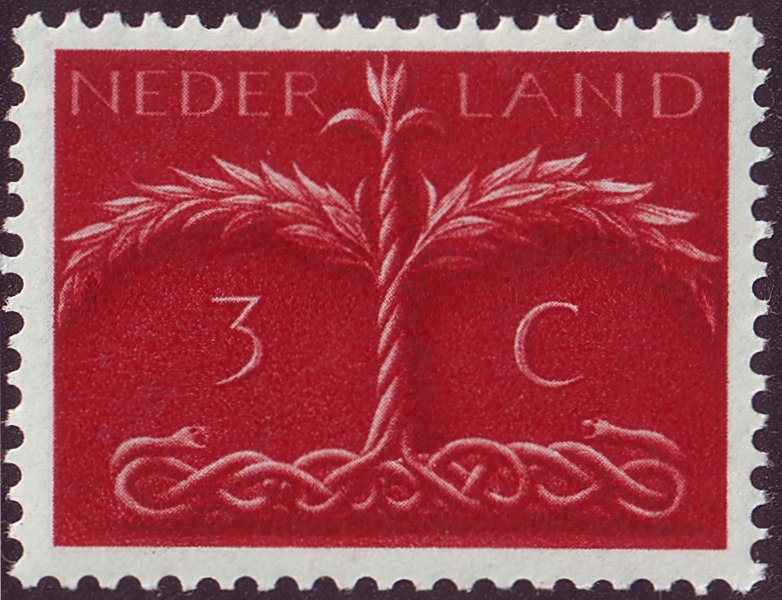
Snake tree

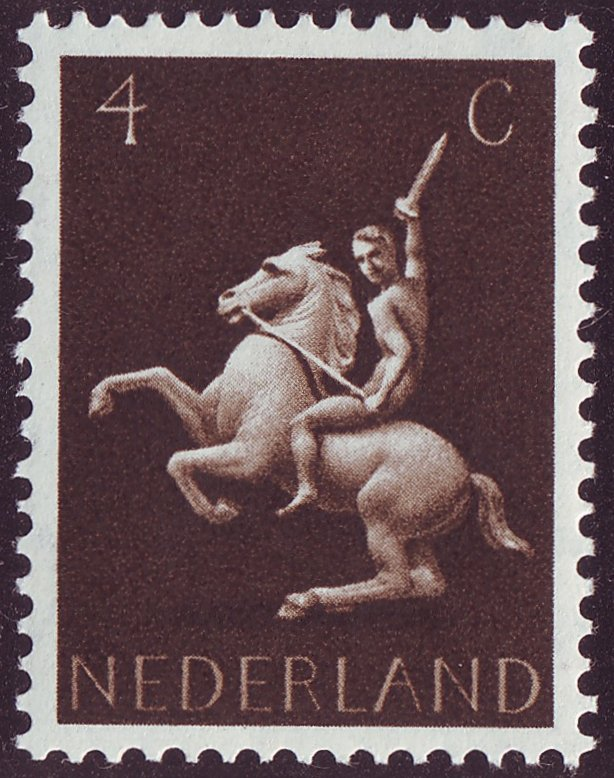
Horseback riding

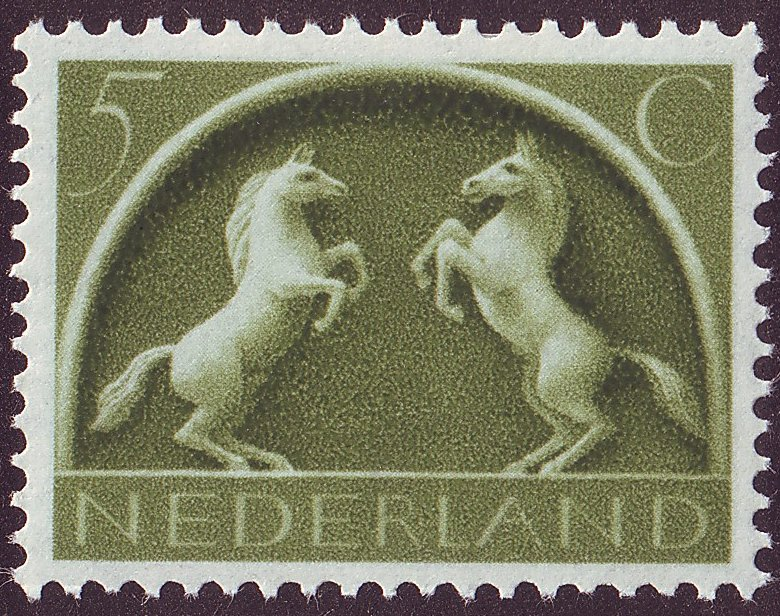
Saxon horses

=== Later career ===
After the war his work became less popular. Abstract expressionism and other more conceptual forms of art became the norm. All forms of realism were considered old fashioned. Still he had a fan base that continued to buy his work. He had a retrospective solo exhibition in the Stedelijk Museum in Amsterdam in 1955 and in the Gemeentemuseum, Arnhem in 1966.

Koch was a perfectionist in the extreme. He worked slowly and destroyed many of his works because he was not satisfied with the result. His oeuvre is therefore quite small. Still it has been incorporated in all major collections in the Netherlands.

Early in the 1980s Koch was diagnosed with Alzheimer's disease. As his physical and mental abilities declined, he gradually withdrew from public life. He died in Wassenaar on October 27, 1991.
