= Wim Schuhmacher =

Dutch painter and designer

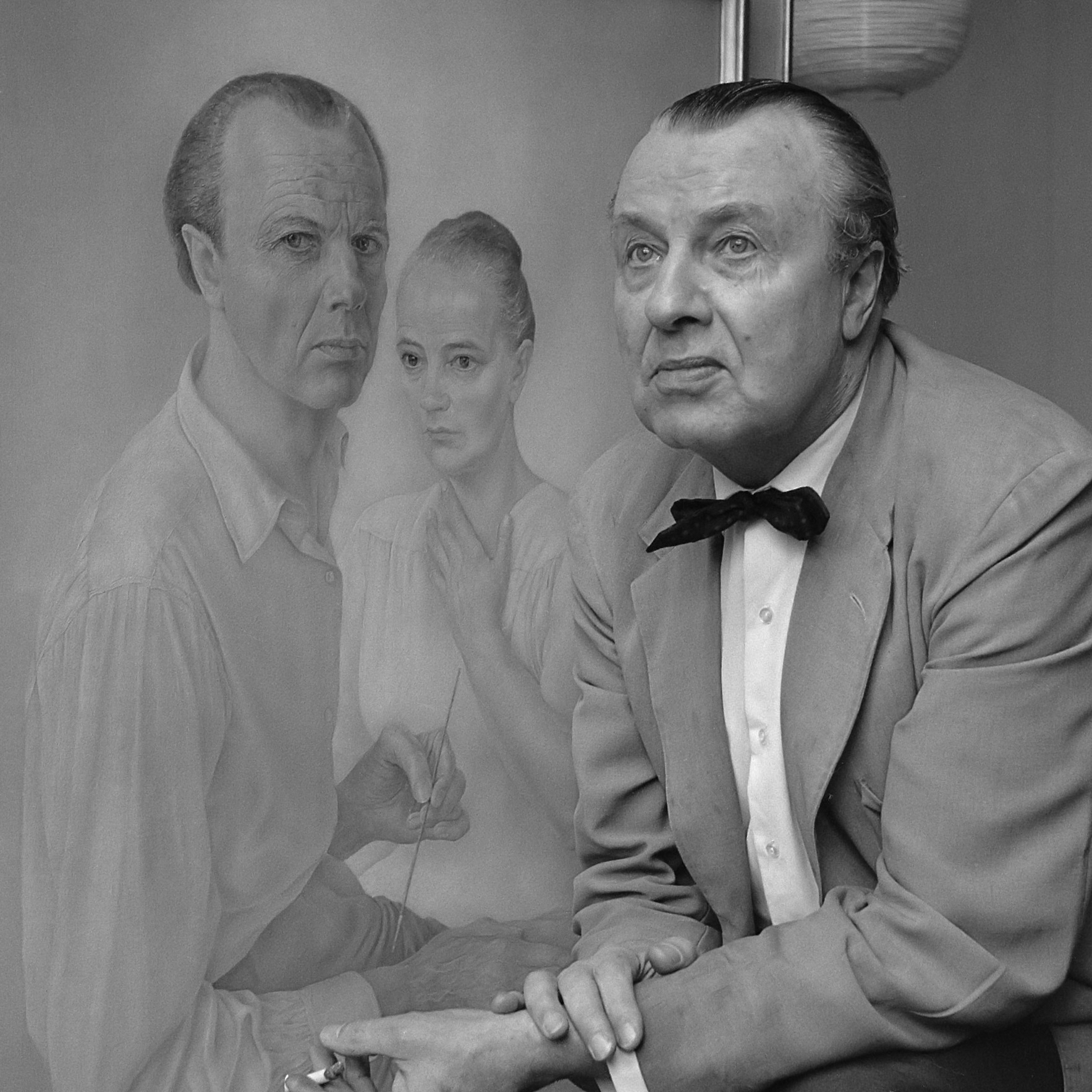
Wim Schuhmacher (1964)

Wijtze Gerrit Carel (Wim) Schuhmacher or Schumacher (28 Feb 1894, Amsterdam - 5 June 1986, Amsterdam) was a Dutch painter and designer. He is mostly associated with Magic realism.

His nickname is "The Master of Grey" because of the grey haze that seems to cover his later work. Towards the end of his life, he became considerably less productive due to increasingly worse eyesight.

== Sources ==
- Wim Schuhmacher at the Netherlands Institute for Art History
