= Carel Willink =

Dutch painter (1900–1983)

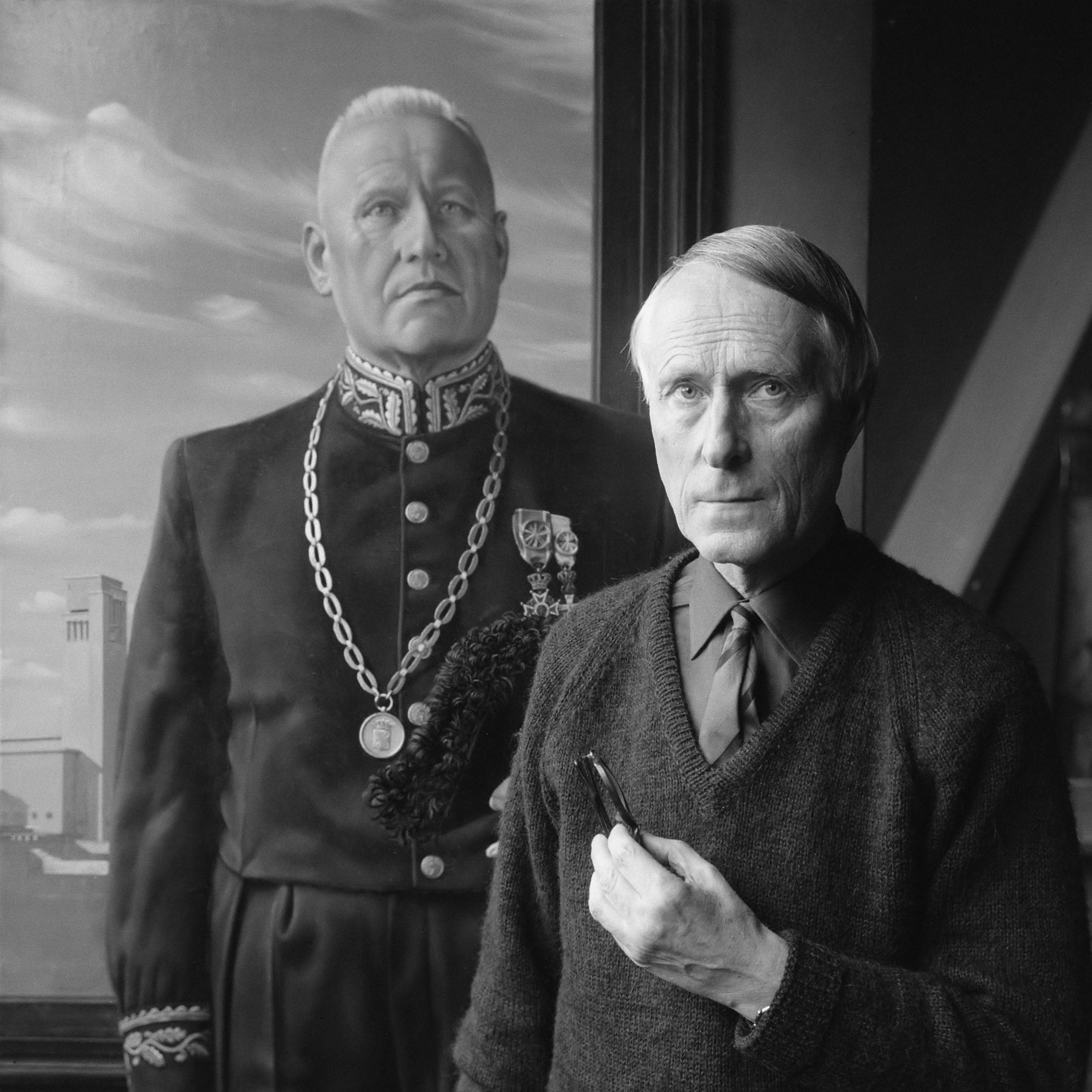
- Carel Willink and one of his paintings
- Born: Albert Carel Willink; 7 March 1900; Amsterdam, Netherlands
- Died: 19 October 1983 (aged 83); Amsterdam, Netherlands
- Known for: Painting
- Movement: Magical realism

Albert Carel Willink (Dutch: [ˈɑlbərt ˈkaːrəl ˈʋɪlɪŋk]; 7 March 1900 – 19 October 1983) was a Dutch painter. He followed a style of Magical realism, which he called "imaginary realism".

== Early life and education ==
Albert Carel Willink was born on 7 March 1900 in Amsterdam in the Netherlands. He was the eldest son of the mechanic Jan Willink and Wilhelmina Altes. His father was an amateur artist who encouraged his son to paint.

After briefly studying medicine, in 1918-19 Willink studied architecture at the Technische Hogeschool in Delft. Afterwards he left for Germany, where he failed to get into the academy in Düsseldorf. He later studied for a short time at the Staatliche Hochschule in Berlin, followed by the International art academy from Hans Baluschek, where he explored several types of avant garde and abstract art, and met the Berlin-based artist Herbert Behrens-Hangeler with whom he became close friends.

== Career ==
Willink's earliest paintings were in an expressionist manner, although he also painted abstract works at the time that he exhibited with the November group in 1923. At the end of 1923 he moved back to Amsterdam. By 1924 he had adopted a figurative style influenced by Picasso's neoclassical paintings of the early 1920s, and especially by Léger. Later in the decade, Willink developed a magic realist style related to the metaphysical paintings of Giorgio de Chirico.

From 1924 until his death Willink lived in Amsterdam. His realistically rendered paintings frequently depict slightly disquieting scenes taking place in front of imposing buildings. He also painted many portraits.

== Personal life and death ==
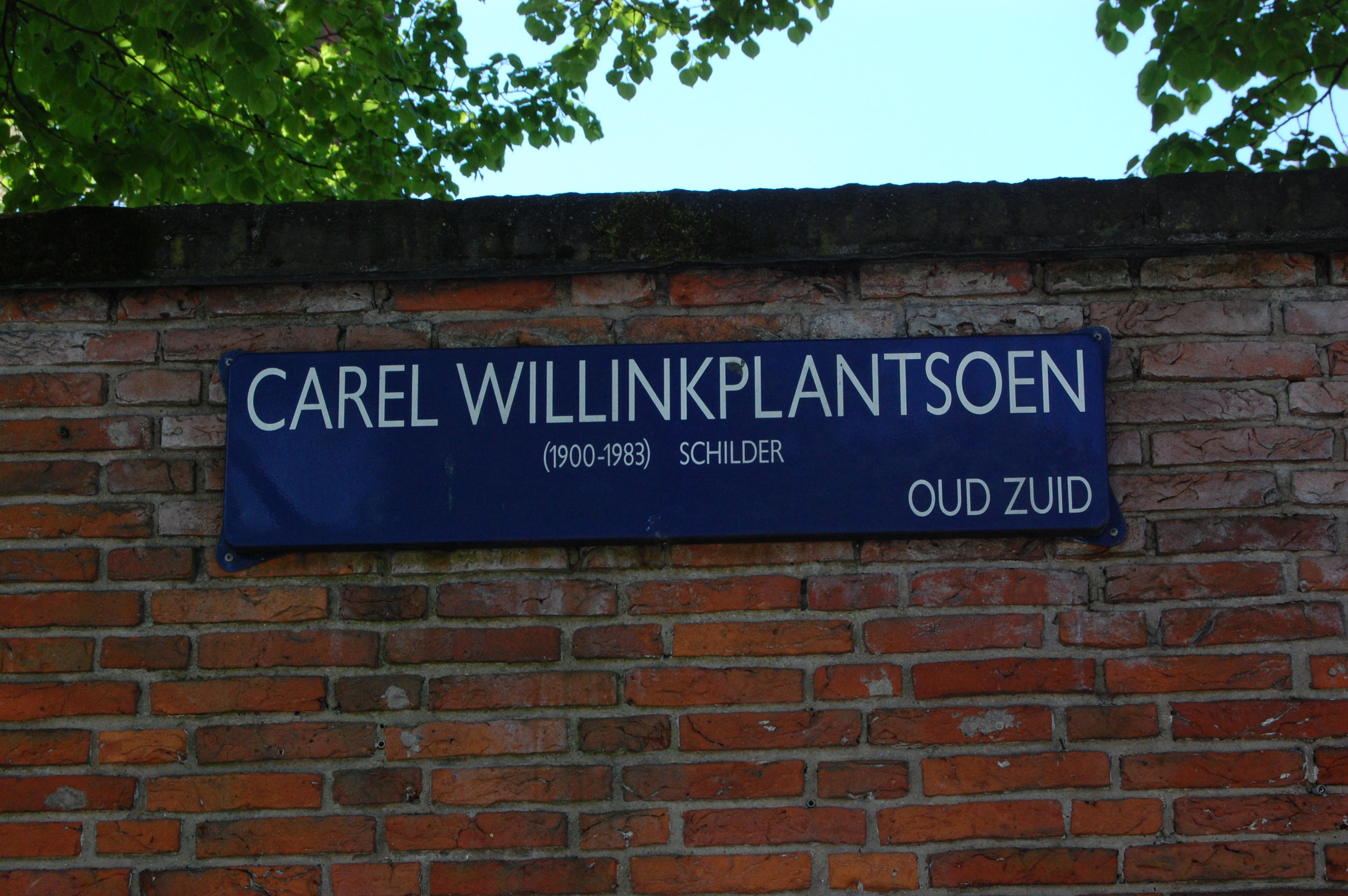
Carel Willinkplantsoen park name plate, Amsterdam

Willink married four times. His first marriage in 1927 with Mies van der Meulen (1900–1988) dissolved after a year, but his second in 1930 with Wilma Jeuken (1905–1960) lasted until her death of a brain tumor. In 1962, he started a relationship with the 38-year younger Mathilde de Doelder, whom he married in 1969. Their eccentric relationship made them a mainstay in the Dutch gossip columns of the time. In 1975, Willink started an affair with the 44-year younger sculptor Sylvia Quiël. In 1977 he divorced De Doelder, who either committed suicide or was murdered 4 months later. The same year he married Quiël.

Willink died, at the age of 83, in Amsterdam on 19 October 1983.

== Legacy ==
A small park in Amsterdam, near the Rijksmuseum, is named in his honour.

== Public collections ==
- Museum de Fundatie, Zwolle
- Van Abbemuseum, Eindhoven
- Museum MORE, Gorssel
- Ruurlo Castle, Ruurlo
- Stedelijk Museum Amsterdam
- Museum Boijmans van Beuningen, Rotterdam
- Kunstmuseum Den Haag
- Royal Museum of Fine Arts Antwerp
- Museum Arnhem
- Centraal Museum Utrecht

== Gallery ==
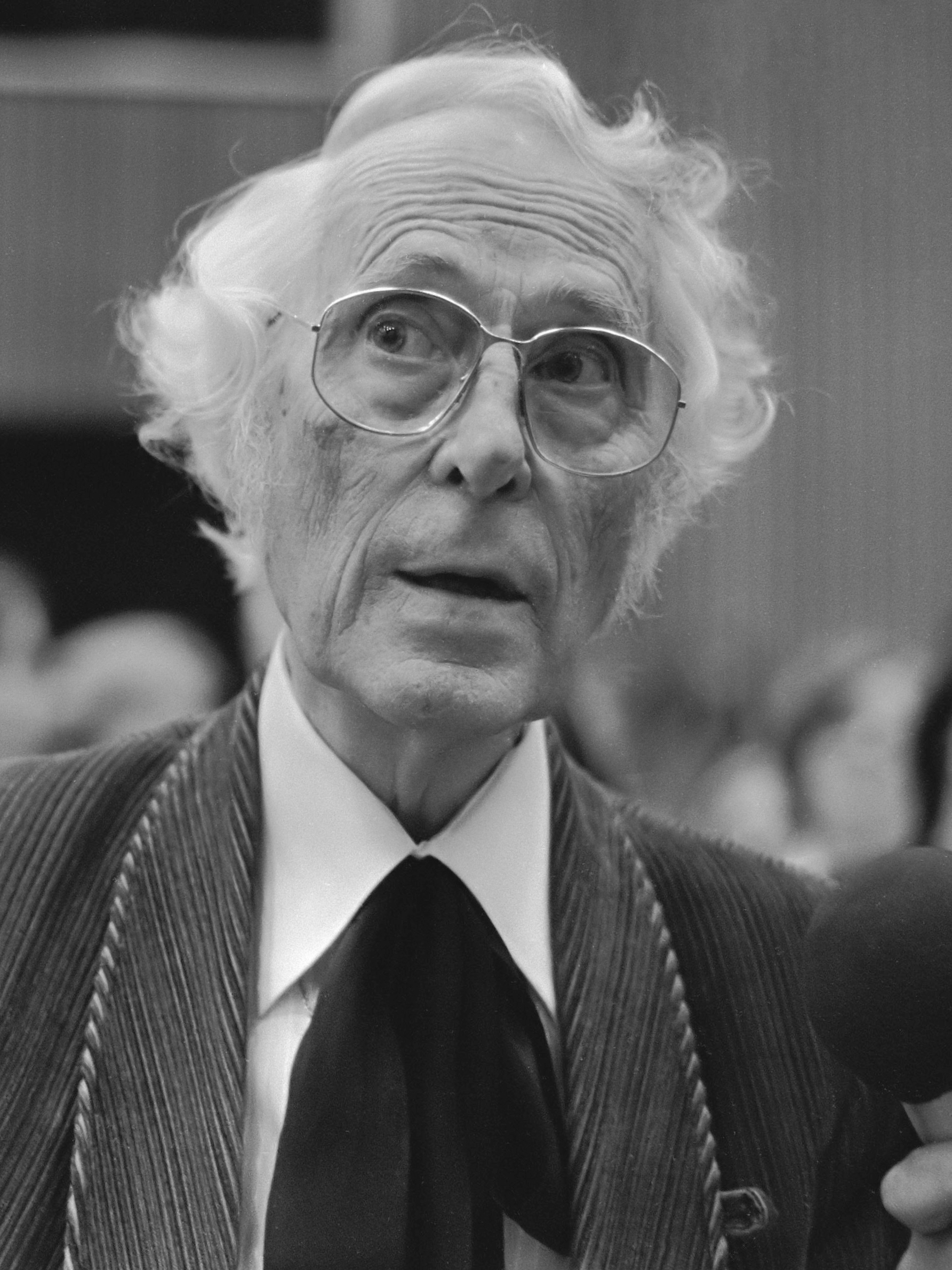
Carel Willink (1980)

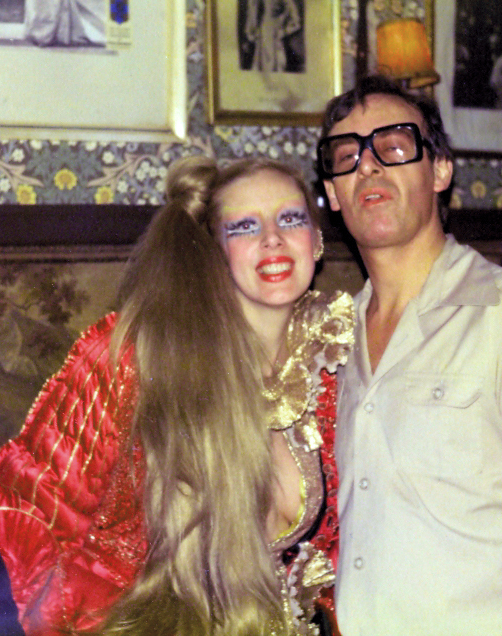
Third wife Mathilde (1975)

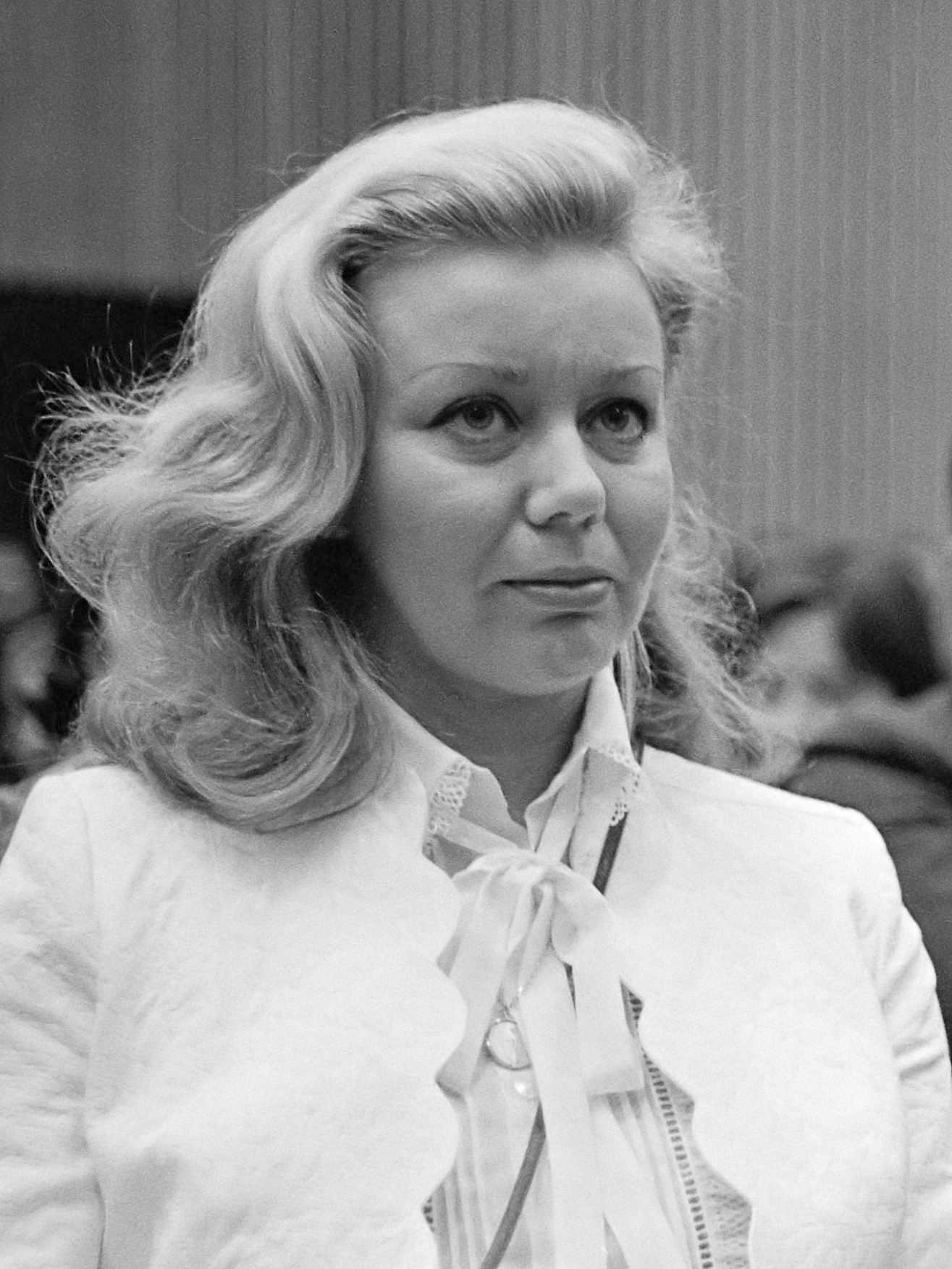
Fourth wife Sylvia (1980)

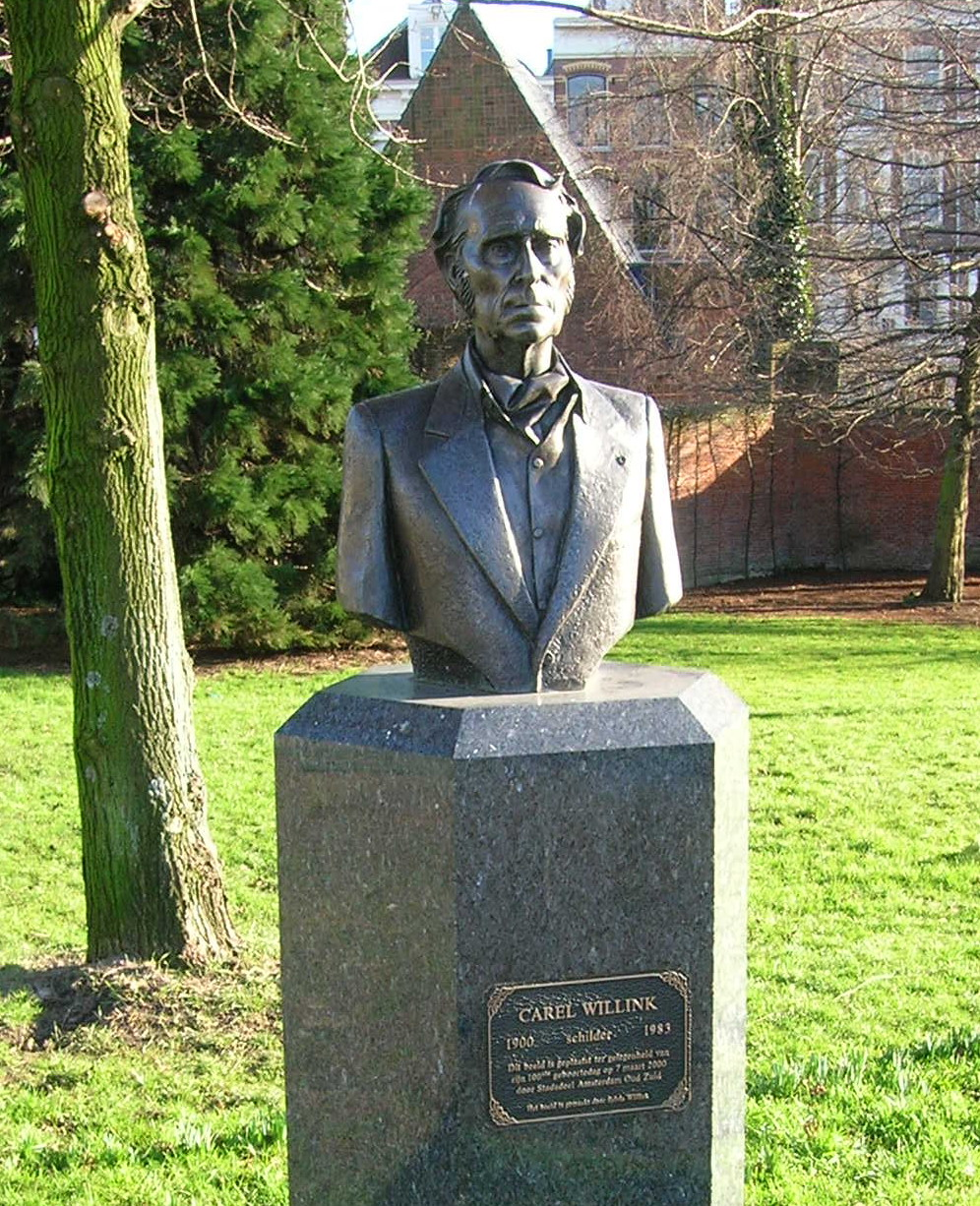
Bust by wife Sylvia near Rijksmuseum

== See also ==
- Late Visitors to Pompeii
- To the Future
- Wilma with Cat
- The Zeppelin
