= Raoul Hynckes =

Dutch painter

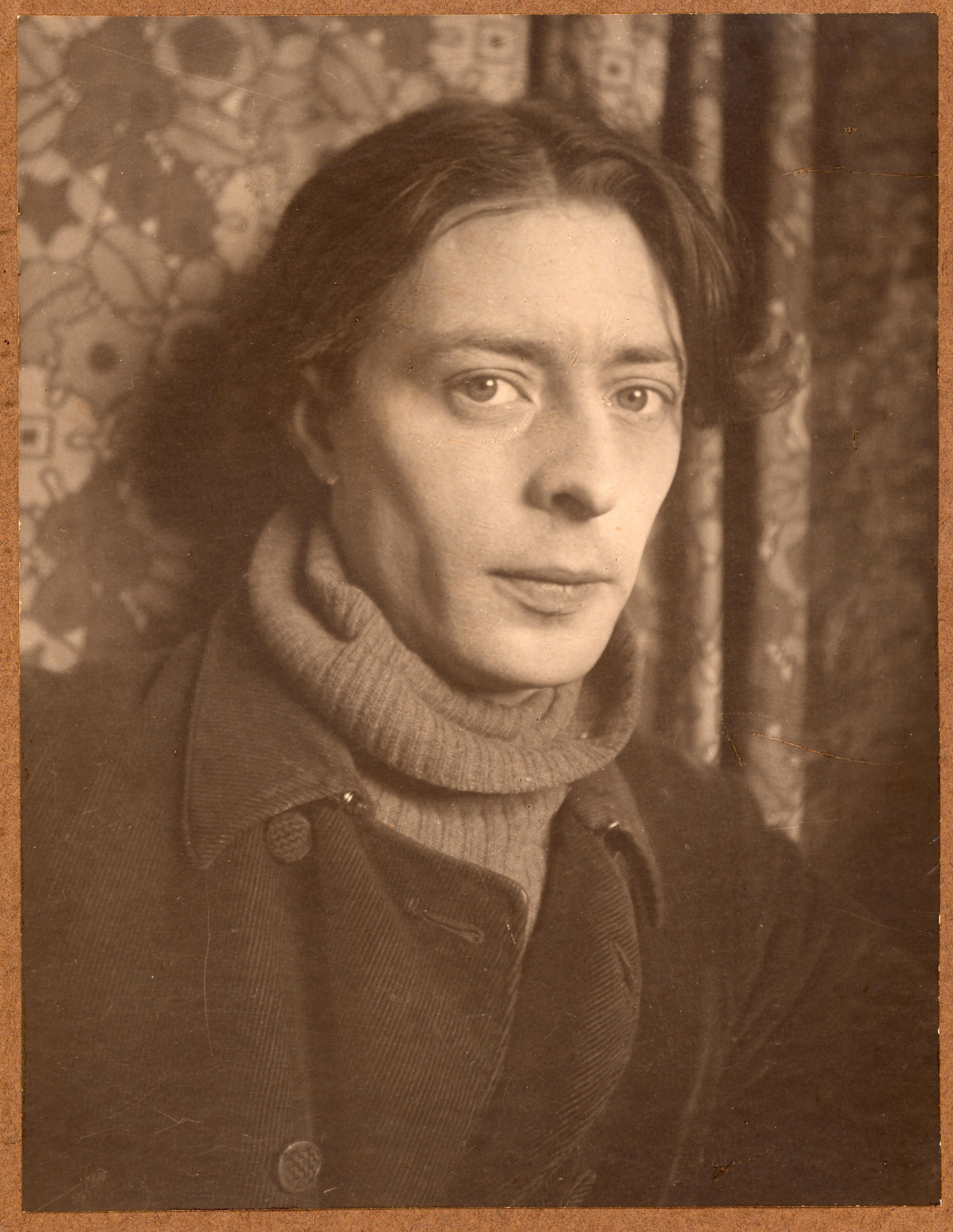
Raoul Hynckes

Raoul Hynckes ( Brussels, 11 May 1893 – Blaricum, 19 January 1973) was a Dutch painter of Belgian origin. The style of Hynckes was initially impressionistic, but in the 1930s he began allegorical still lifes to paint in a very realistic manner and in an extremely fine and meticulous painting style (withered trees, old nails, skulls). He is counted among the magical realists. Regularly he also worked as a bookbinding designer and poster designer. Hynckes gained further fame through his autobiographical writings "Friends of Midnight", appeared in the series Private Domain.
