= Dick Ket =

Dutch painter

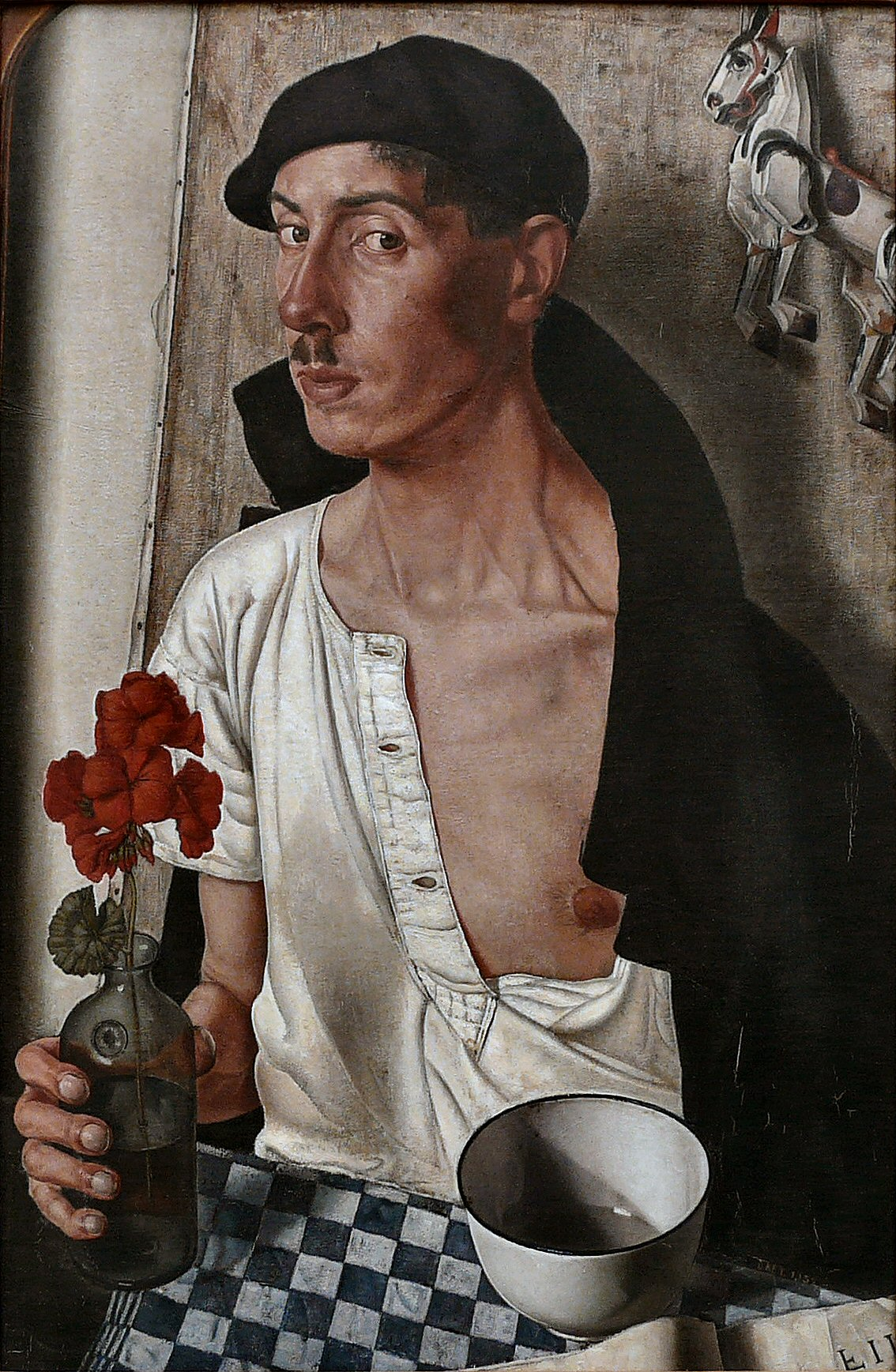
- Self-portrait
- Born: October 10, 1902; Den Helder, Netherlands
- Died: September 15, 1940 (aged 37); Bennekom, Netherlands
- Known for: Painting, Magic realism, Still life, Self-portrait

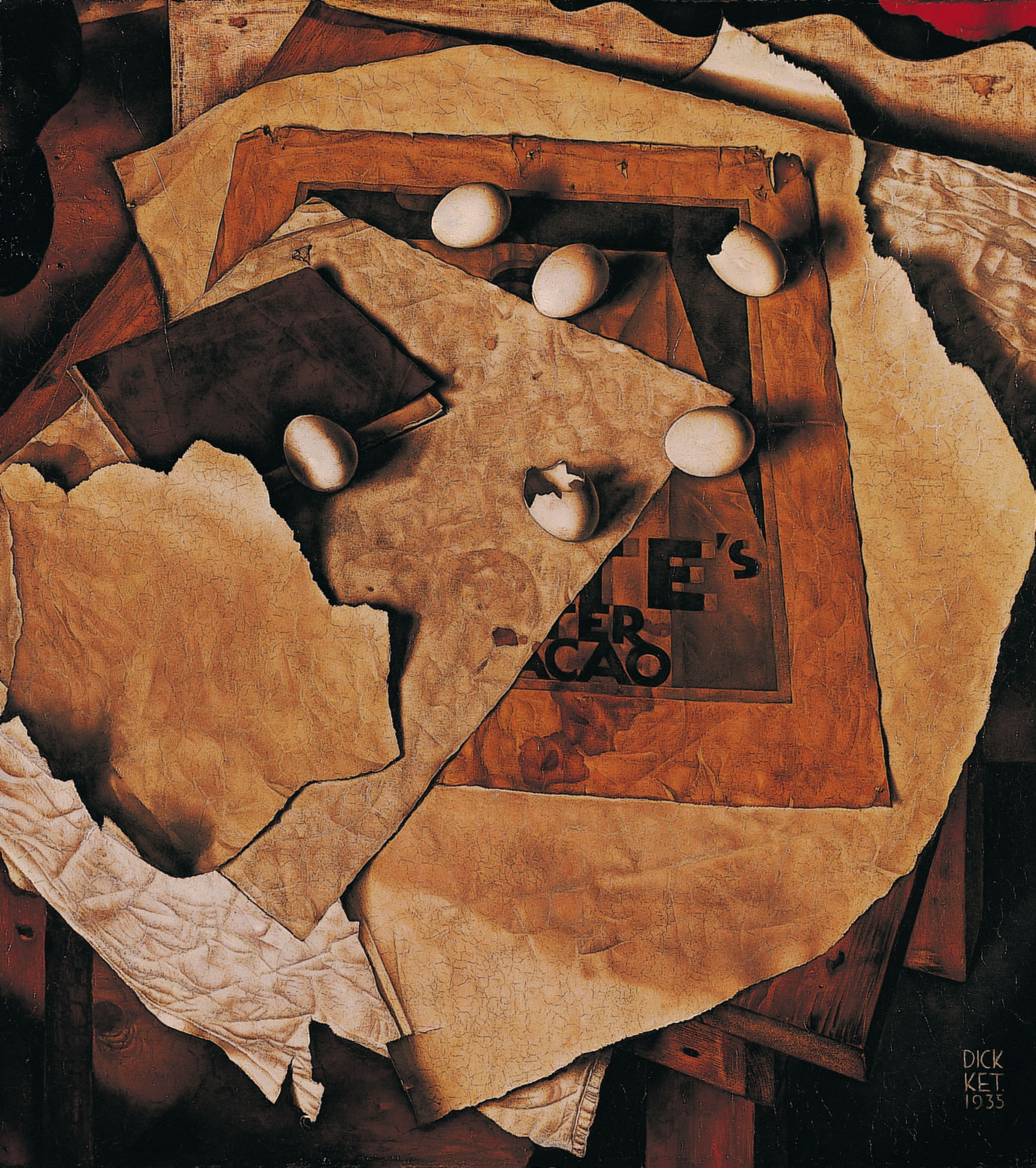
Still-life with Eggs

Dick Ket (October 10, 1902 – September 15, 1940) was a Dutch painter noted for his still lifes and self-portraits in a style he referred to as New Realism.

== Biography ==
Born in Den Helder, Ket spent his childhood in Hoorn and then Ede before attending the Kunstoefening in Arnhem from 1922 to 1925. Born with a serious heart defect (believed to be tetralogy of Fallot with dextrocardia), he was prevented from traveling by debilitating weakness as well as by phobias, and lived secluded in his parents' house in Bennekom after 1930. Exposed to modern art mainly through reproductions, he concentrated on painting still lifes and self-portraits. His health worsened in his last decade, leading to his early death in Bennekom in 1940.

== Works ==
While Ket's earliest paintings are impressionistic in style, he was influenced decisively by the art of the Neue Sachlichkeit in 1929, and thereafter painted in a style he called New Realism, which has affinities with magic realism.

His meticulously composed and rendered still lifes feature favorite objects such as bottles, an empty bowl, eggs, and musical instruments. Ket juxtaposed these objects in angular arrangements, seen from a high vantage point, their cast shadows creating emphatic diagonals. These compositions reveal the influence of cubism as filtered through the posters of Cassandre, which are frequently depicted in Ket’s paintings. Another source of inspiration came from early Netherlandish painting, which Ket admired for its atmosphere of austere reverence that he called its quality of "intrusiveness".

Ket completed approximately 140 paintings, including forty self-portraits. As a result of his technical experimentation with different formulations and additives to the glaze medium, some of his paintings are not completely dry after six decades. In his self-portraits the progressive symptoms of his physical deterioration, such as cyanosis and nail clubbing, are apparent.

Museums holding works by Dick Ket include the Rijksmuseum in Amsterdam, the Museum Arnhem, and the Museum Boijmans Van Beuningen in Rotterdam.

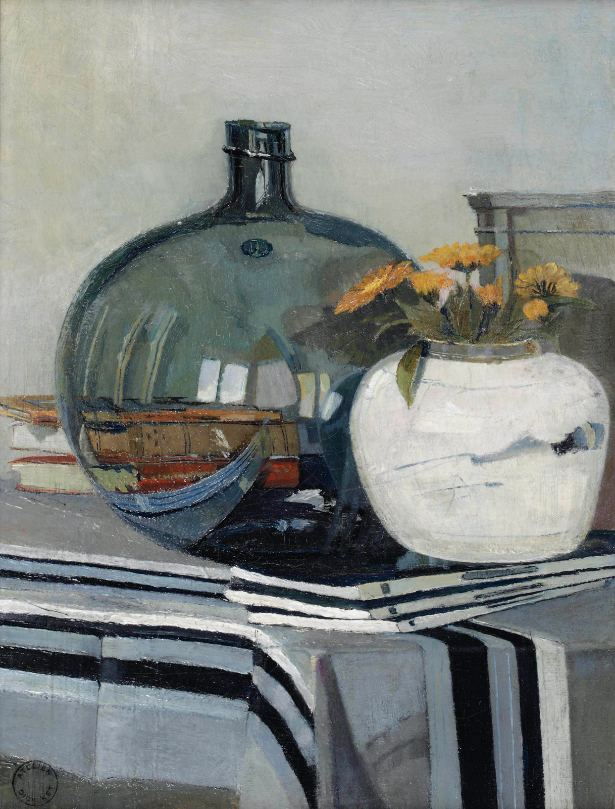
Still life with books (1925)

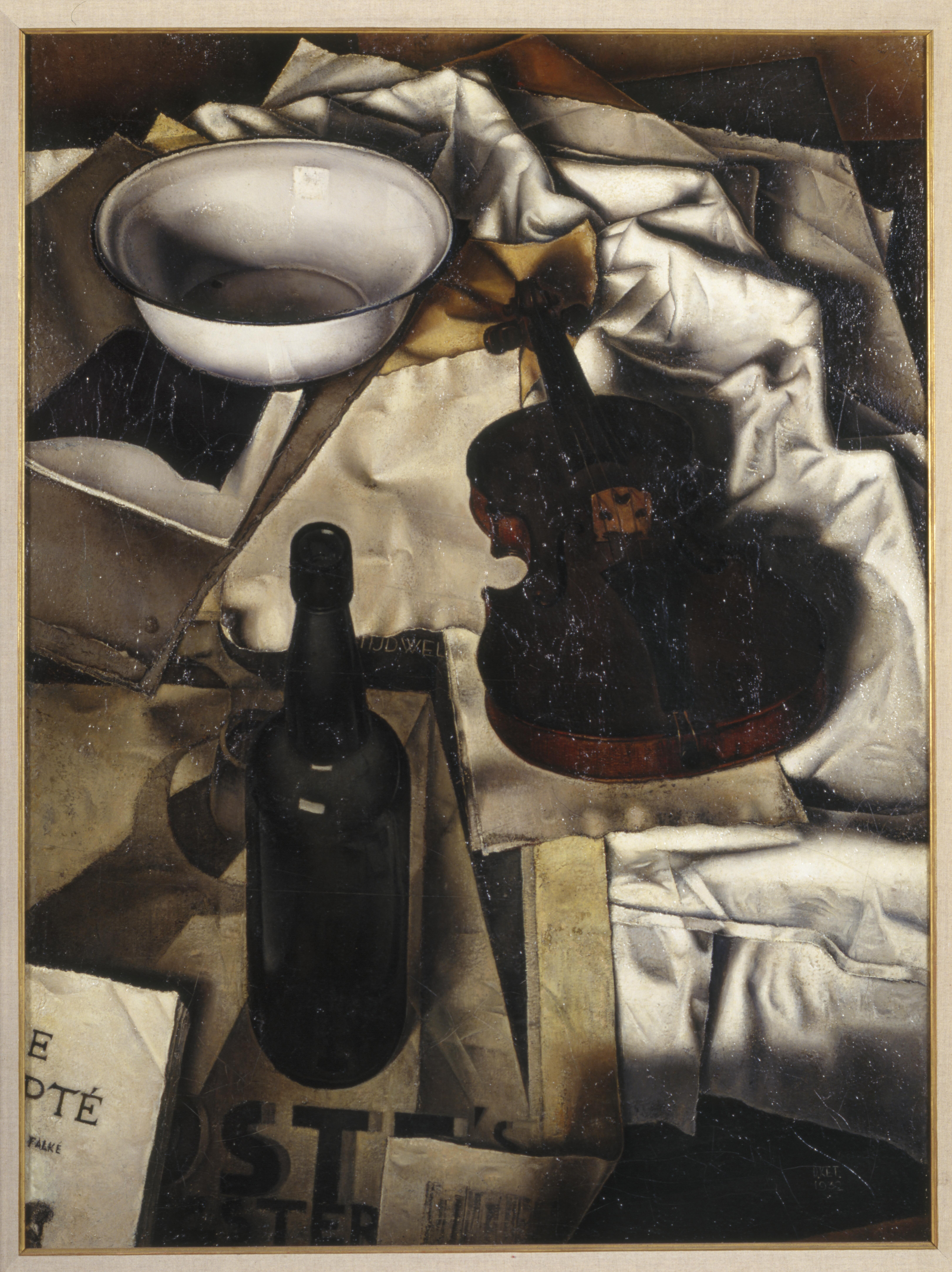
Still life with violin (1932)

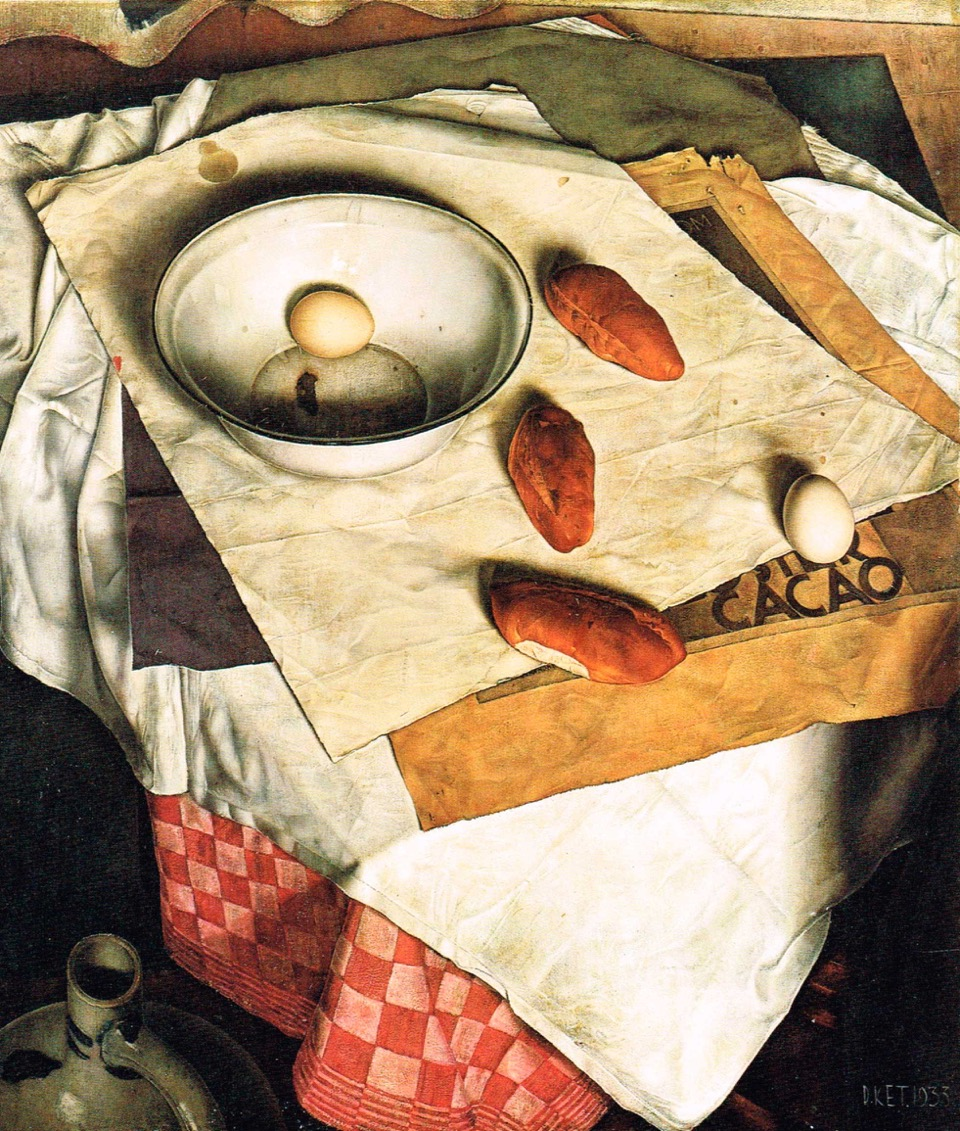
Still life with bread (1935)

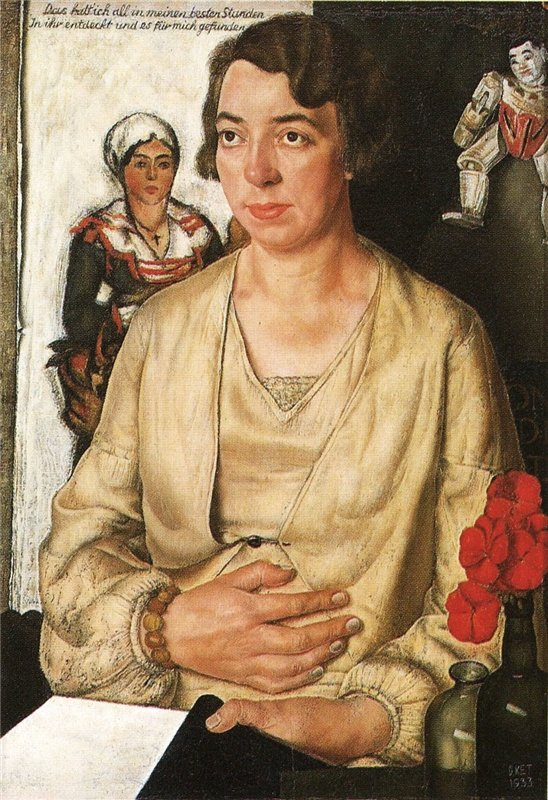
Portrait of Nel Schilt (before 1939)

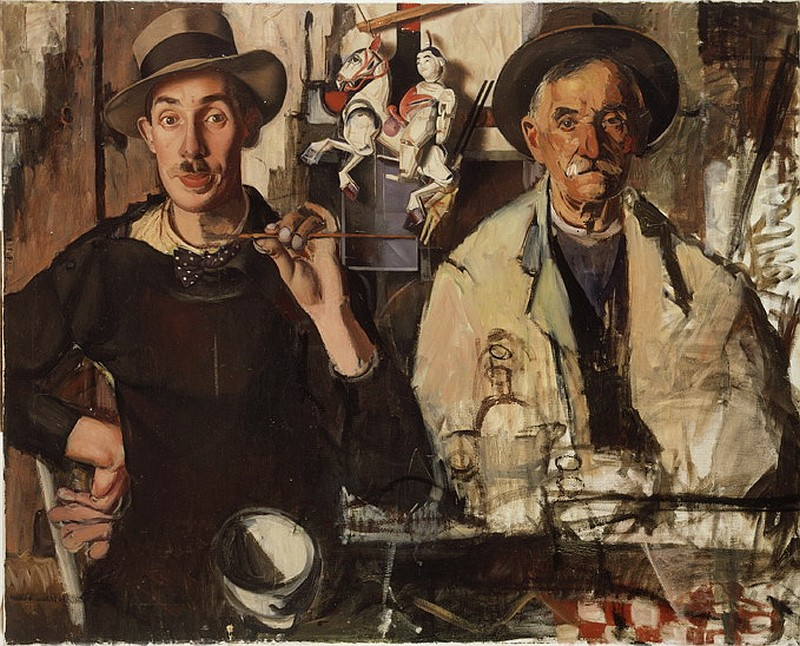
Double portrait with father (1939)
