= Hans Melchers =

Dutch businessman (1938–2023)

- Born: 18 May 1938; Apeldoorn, Netherlands
- Died: 4 November 2023 (aged 85)
- Spouse: Married
- Children: 2

Hans Daniel Melchers (18 May 1938 – 4 November 2023) was a Dutch businessman. Melchers founded Melchemie Holland BV, and was major (15%) shareholder in HAL Investments BV. With a total capital of €460 million, Melchers reached a 36th spot in the 2005 edition of the Quote 500-list of the most wealthy Dutch.

On the Forbes 2019 list of the world's billionaires, he was ranked #916 with a net worth of US$2.5 billion.

From the early 1990s until 2007, Melchers was a major sponsor of the Dutch Bridge Federation (NBB). In 2008 Melchers started his own professional bridge team. He "provided major funding for the 2011 world bridge championship held in the Netherlands" (in Veldhoven, hosted by NBB).

His daughter, Claudia, was the victim of a kidnapping in September 2005. She was released after two days of confinement.

Melchers died on 4 November 2023, at the age of 85.
