= The Herring Merchant =

Painting by Gabriël Metsu

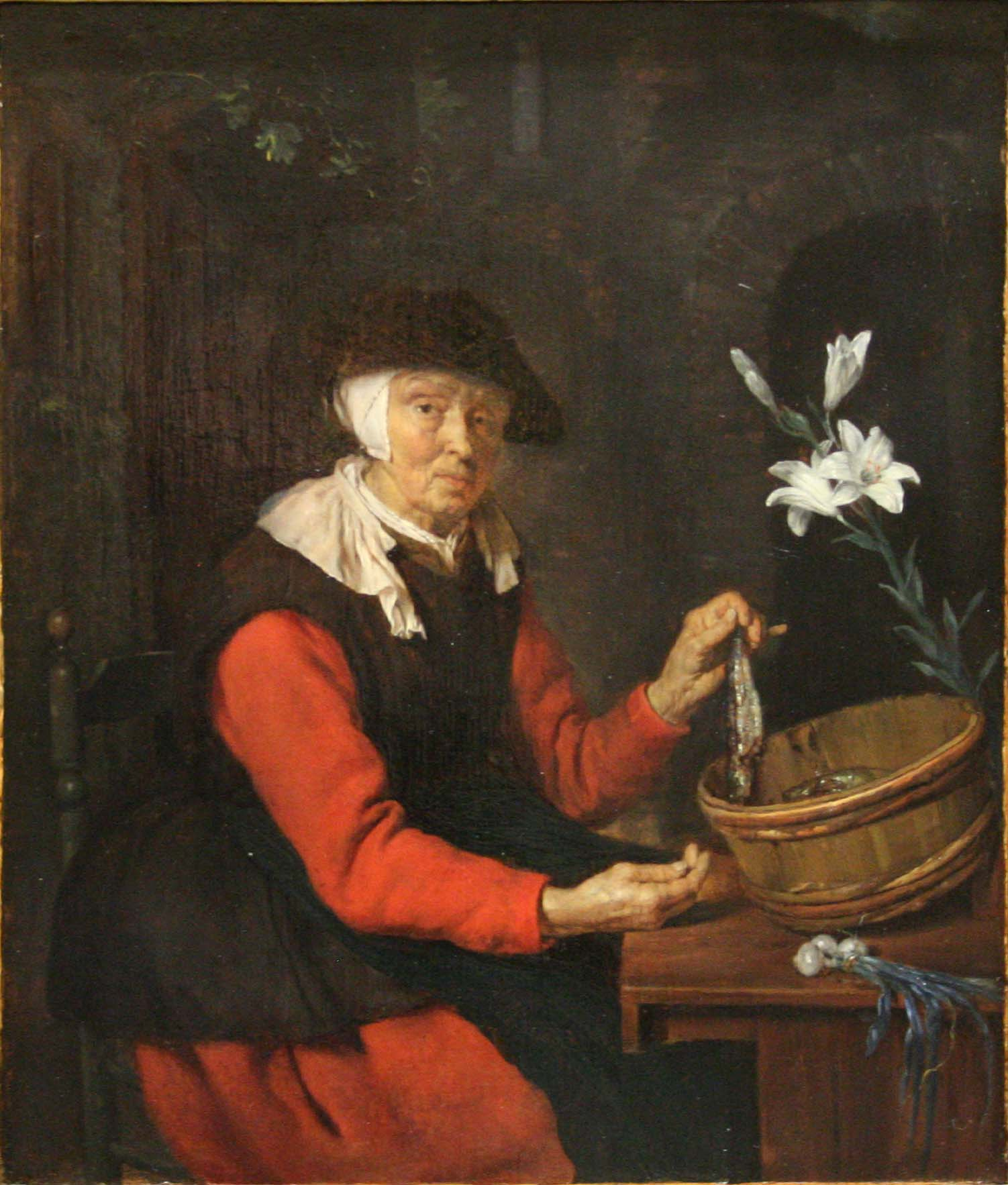
The Herring Merchant (c. 1660) by Gabriël Metsu

The Herring Merchant is a c. 1660 painting by Gabriël Metsu. It has been in the Musée Fabre in Montpellier, France, since 1836.

The central figure is a woman dressed in the red and blue colors often associated with market-sellers in the 17th-century Northern Netherlands. Like other contemporary painters, Metsu has chosen the subject of raw herring and onions, a favorite Dutch snack still sold on Dutch street markets today. The motif is also one that Metsu returned to regularly, possibly painted for inns where customers could be tempted to order such a snack.

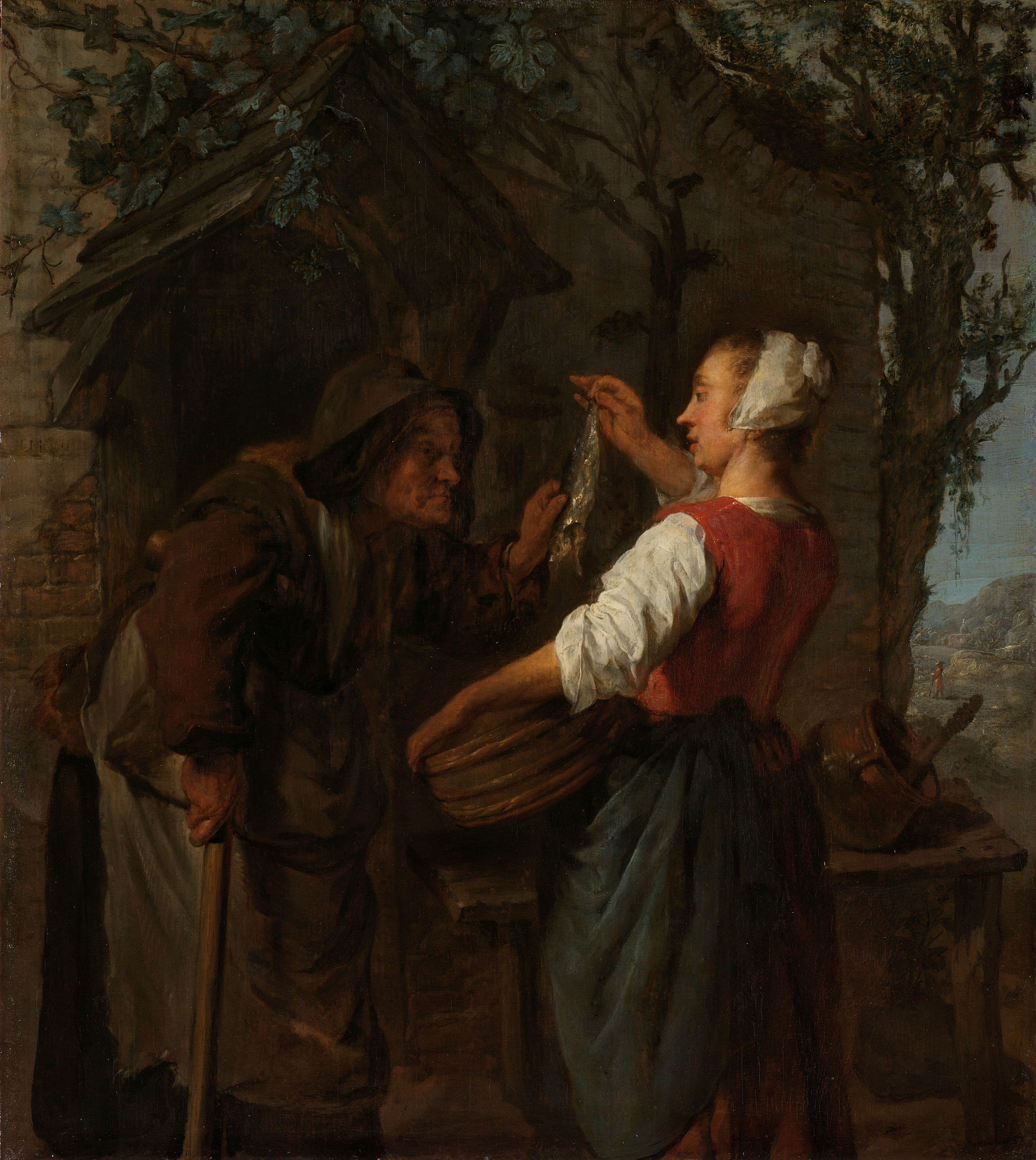
A woman selling herring and onions door-to-door

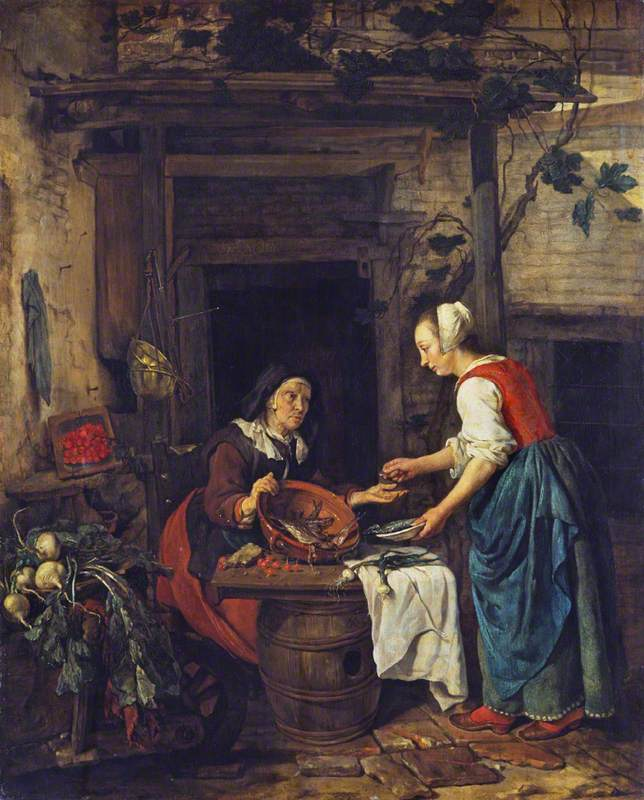
A woman buying fish and onions

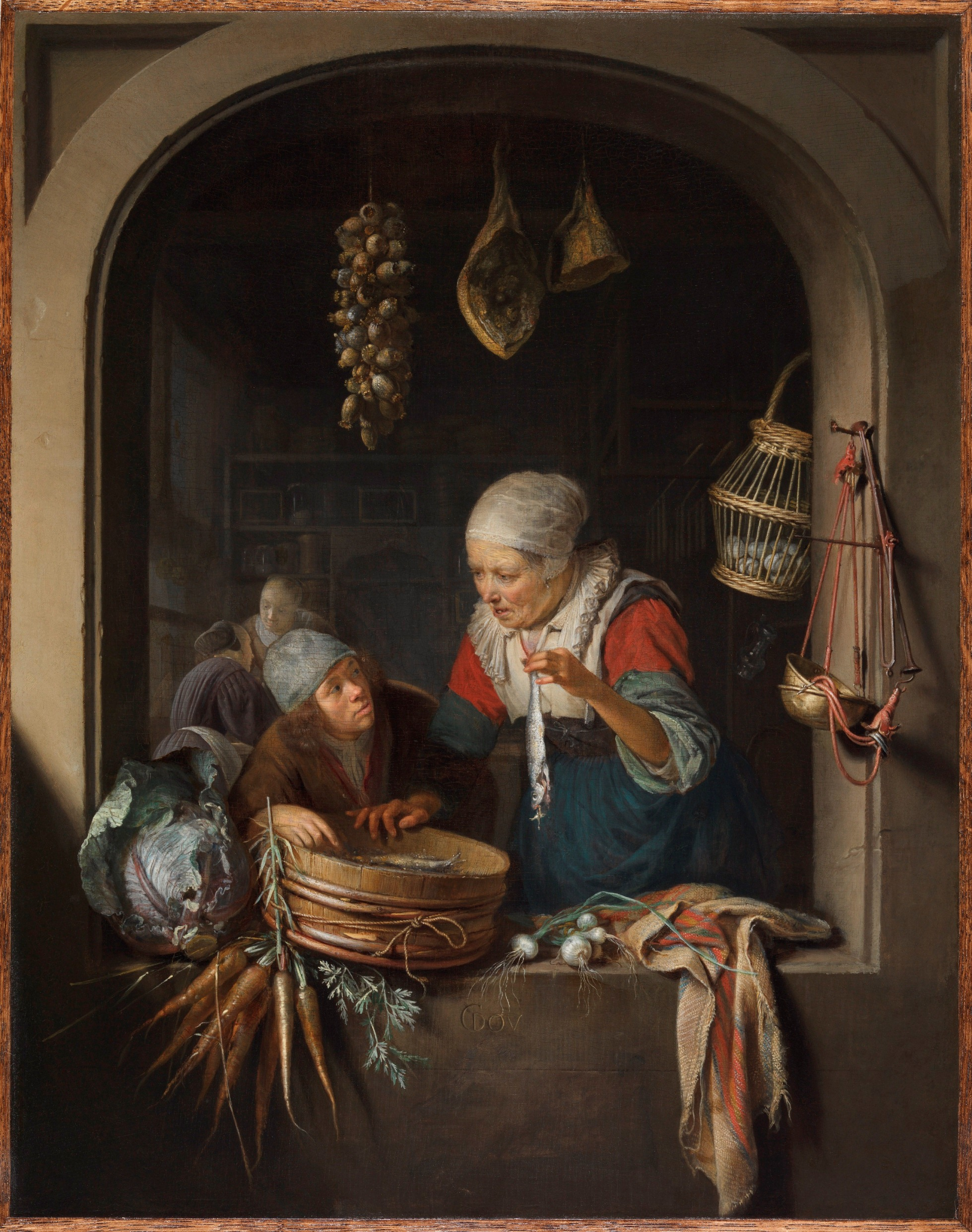
Herring seller and a boy (by Metsu's teacher Gerrit Dou)
