= Woman in a Red Dress =

Painting attributed to Gabriël Metsu

- Head of a Black Woman
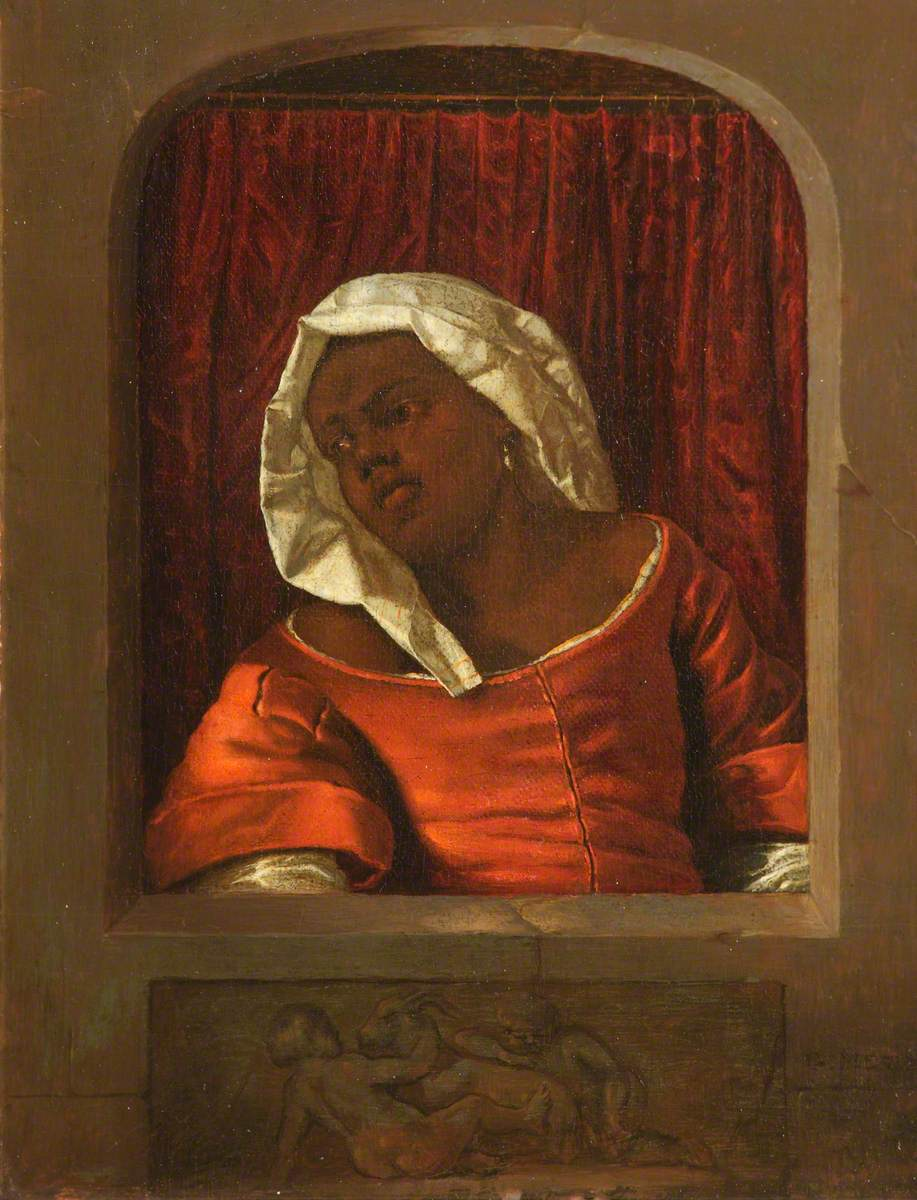
- Artist: Gabriël Metsu
- Year: 1667
- Dimensions: 22.9 cm (9.0 in) × 17.8 cm (7.0 in)
- Location: Polesden Lacey
- Collection: National Trust
- Accession No.: 1246502
- Identifiers: Art UK artwork ID: woman-in-a-red-dress-217806

Woman in a Red Dress is a painting attributed to the Dutch artist Gabriël Metsu, created c. 1660–1669. It has been in England since 1828, and in the collection of Polesden Lacey in Surrey since 1922.

== History and description ==
The motif of a figure presented in a "niche" follows a style made popular by Metsu's teacher and Dutch Golden Age painter Gerrit Dou. The female figure is a black woman dressed in a red bodice similar to that worn by Metsu's wife Isabella de Wolff in a portrait he painted soon after their wedding in Enkhuizen in 1658. Like other contemporary Leiden fijnschilders, Metsu has chosen the subject of a niche or window to frame his subject. The popular motif generally includes a curtain for a dramatic effect, and though Metsu painted curtains sparingly, he has chosen to place his subject prominently in front of a closed curtain here. Her portrayal at first glance needs no other supporting commentary, unlike his other "niche" paintings which are adorned with details in the typical "Dou" manner. A closer look reveals an interesting bas-relief under the window, which appears to be a variation by Metsu on François Duquesnoy's frieze of Children Playing with a Goat. Though its meaning is lost, the frieze offers a clue (along with her dress) that this woman was someone connected to Metsu's circle and was possibly a model for other painters in Leiden.

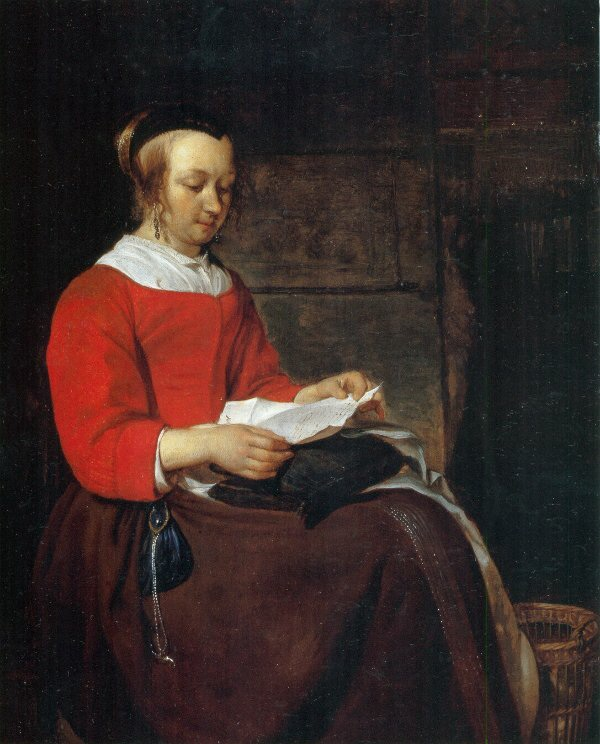
Portrait of Isabella de Wolff in the same dress, but with a chemise

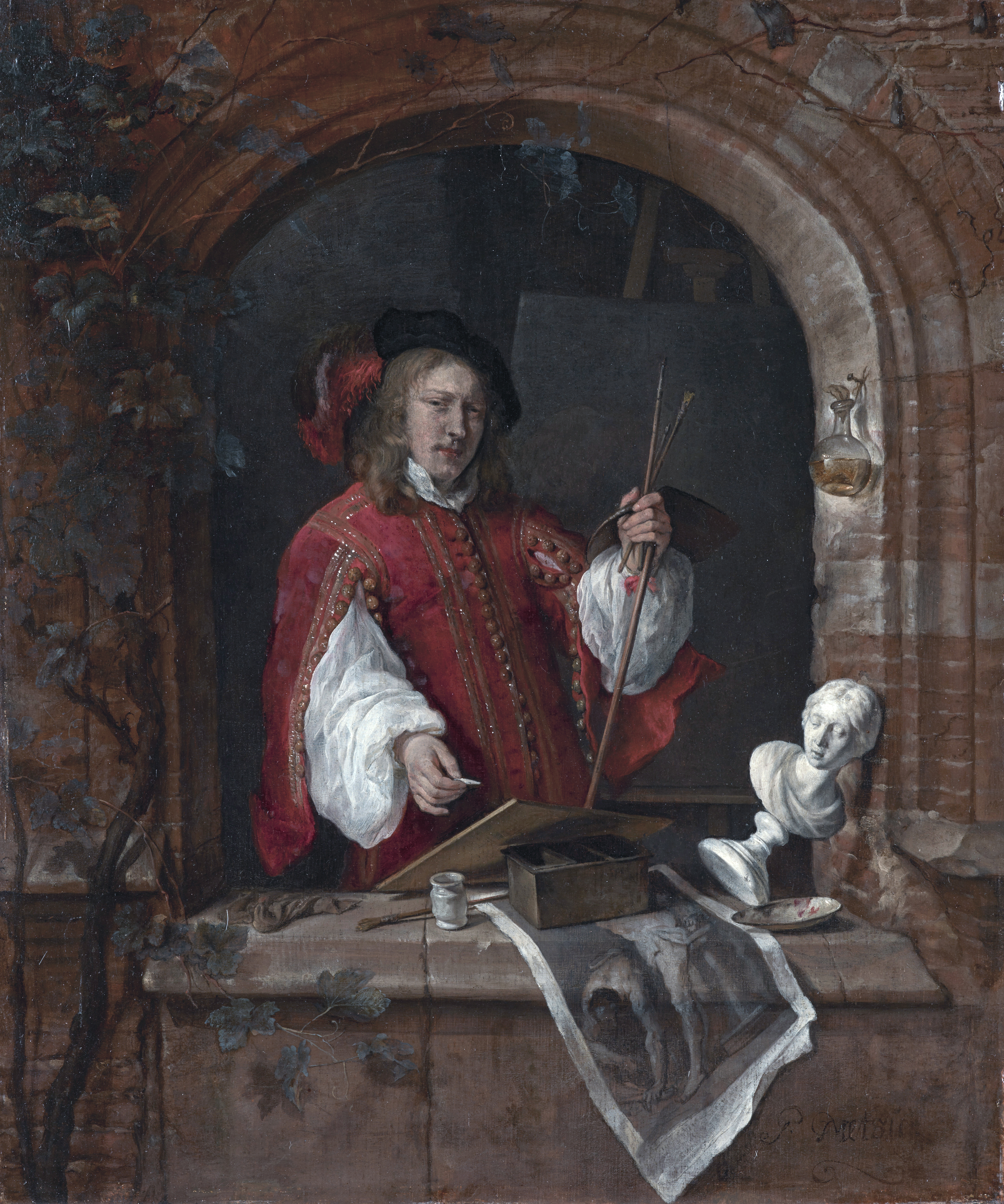
Metsu's self-portrait at a window, with a bust by Duquesnoy

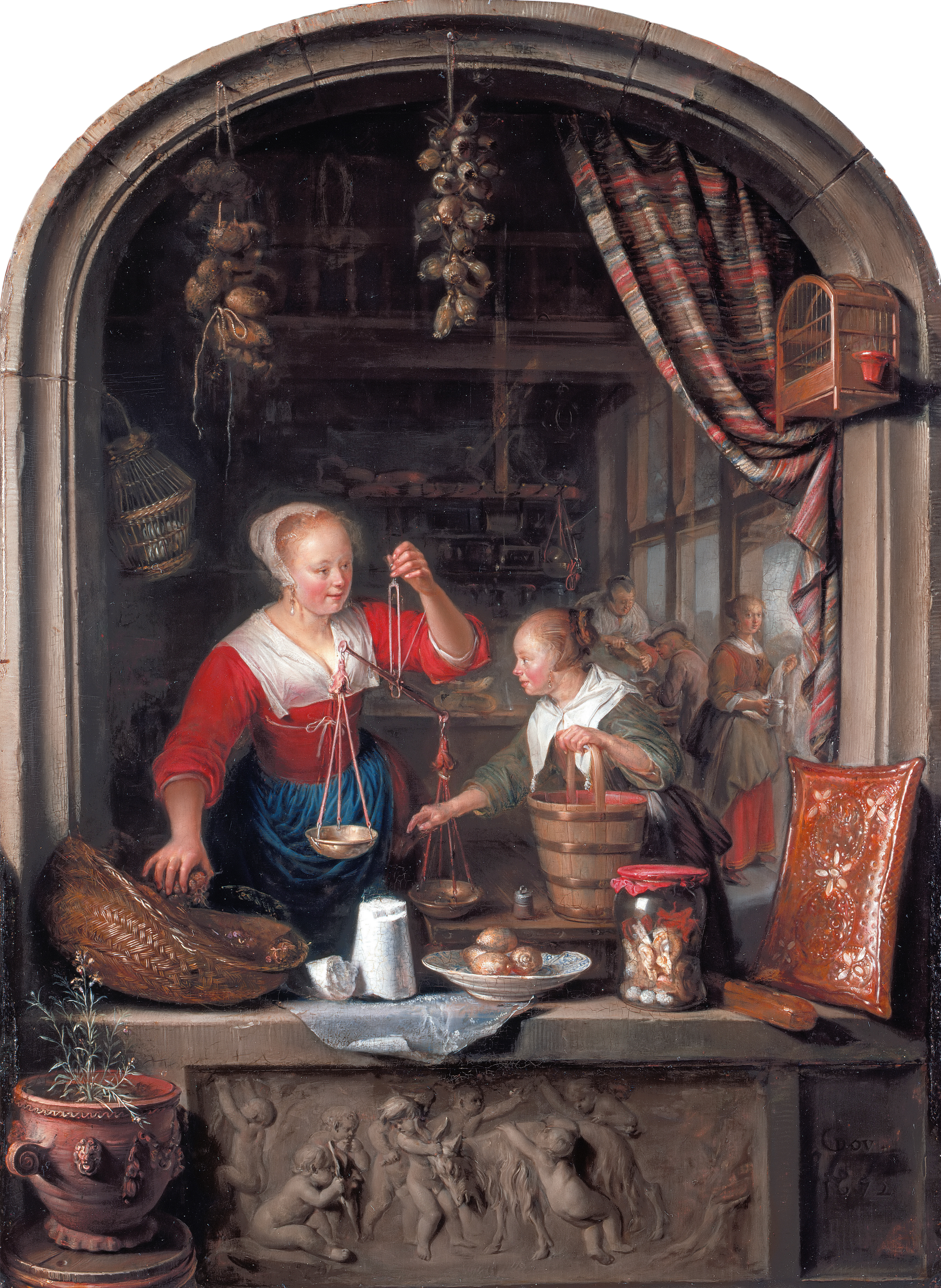
Dou's The Grocer's Shop, with the frieze
