= A Girl Receiving a Letter =

Painting by Gabriël Metsu

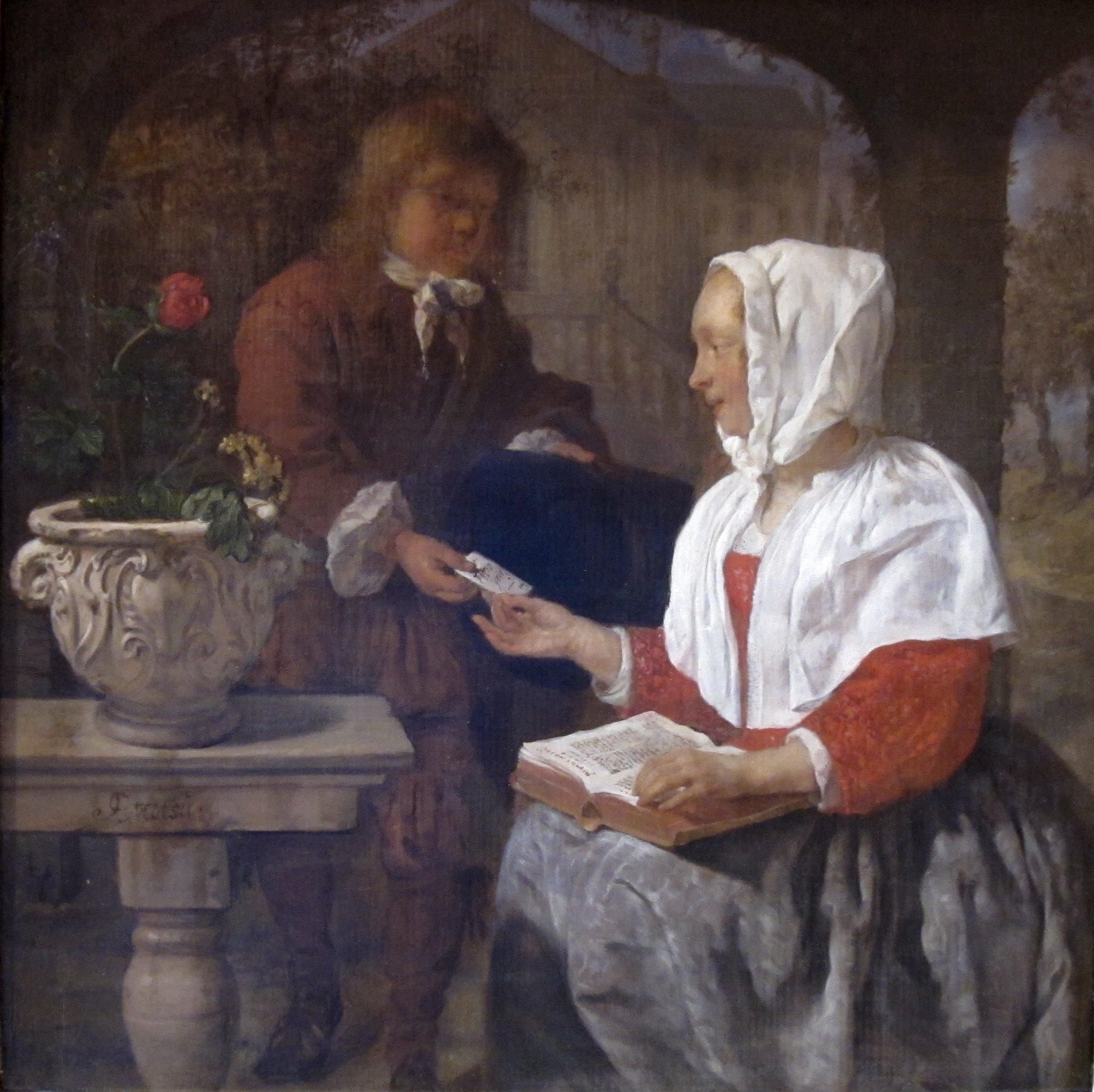
- Artist: Gabriël Metsu
- Year: 1658
- Medium: oil on wood panel
- Dimensions: 25.7 cm × 24.4 cm (10.1 in × 9.6 in)
- Location: Timken Museum of Art, San Diego, California

A Girl Receiving a Letter is an oil painting on a wood panel Dutch artist Gabriël Metsu made c. 1658. The artwork is part of the collection of San Diego's Timken Museum of Art, in California.

== Description ==
It depicts a woman, seated in a arcade, with a book on her lap, who receives a letter, delivered by a boy, presumed addressed to her by a love interest. A vase with some flowers stands in front of her, most likely as a symbolic reference. The arcade shows a Palladian villa. This painting is believed to be a complement to another, A Man with Pen in Hand and a Maid-Servant, now held in the Musée Fabre, in Montpellier, France.

== See also ==
- 1658 in art
