= The Vegetable Market in Amsterdam =

Painting by Gabriël Metsu

- The Greens Market in Amsterdam
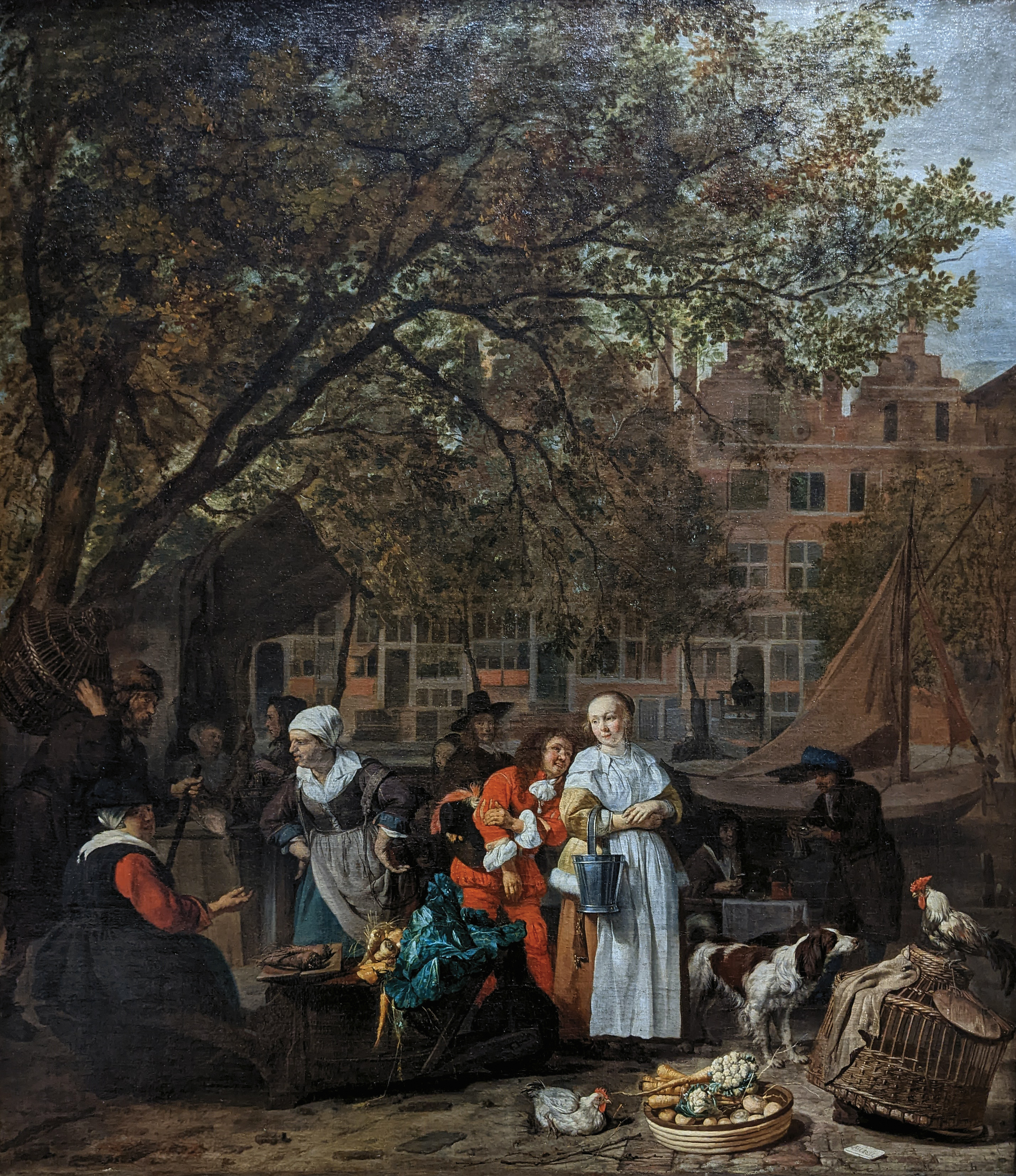
- Artist: Gabriël Metsu
- Year: c. 1660–61
- Medium: oil paint, canvas
- Dimensions: 97 cm (38 in) × 84 cm (33 in) × 4 cm (1.6 in)
- Location: Room 838
- Accession: INV 1460

The Vegetable Market in Amsterdam is an oil on canvas painting Dutch painter Gabriël Metsu created c. 1660-1661. It is an example of Dutch Golden Age painting and is now part of the collection of the Louvre, in Paris.

Hofstede de Groot in 1908 wrote; "It is an excellent work, but it is in an exceedingly damaged condition. The trees are not, on the whole, well rendered; it is obvious that Metsu was no landscape painter..."

Sm. says (1833):—"This capital picture has had the reputation of being the chef d'œuvre of the master, and the large prices for which it has been sold go far to confirm that opinion. The writer, however, can by no means subscribe to it, for there are several described in this work that possess much higher claims to the admiration of the connoisseur."

The work is 38 and 32.5 inches, on canvas. It was at one point in the collection of King Louis XVI.

== Details ==
This painting was recently cleaned which makes it possible to observe more details than before:

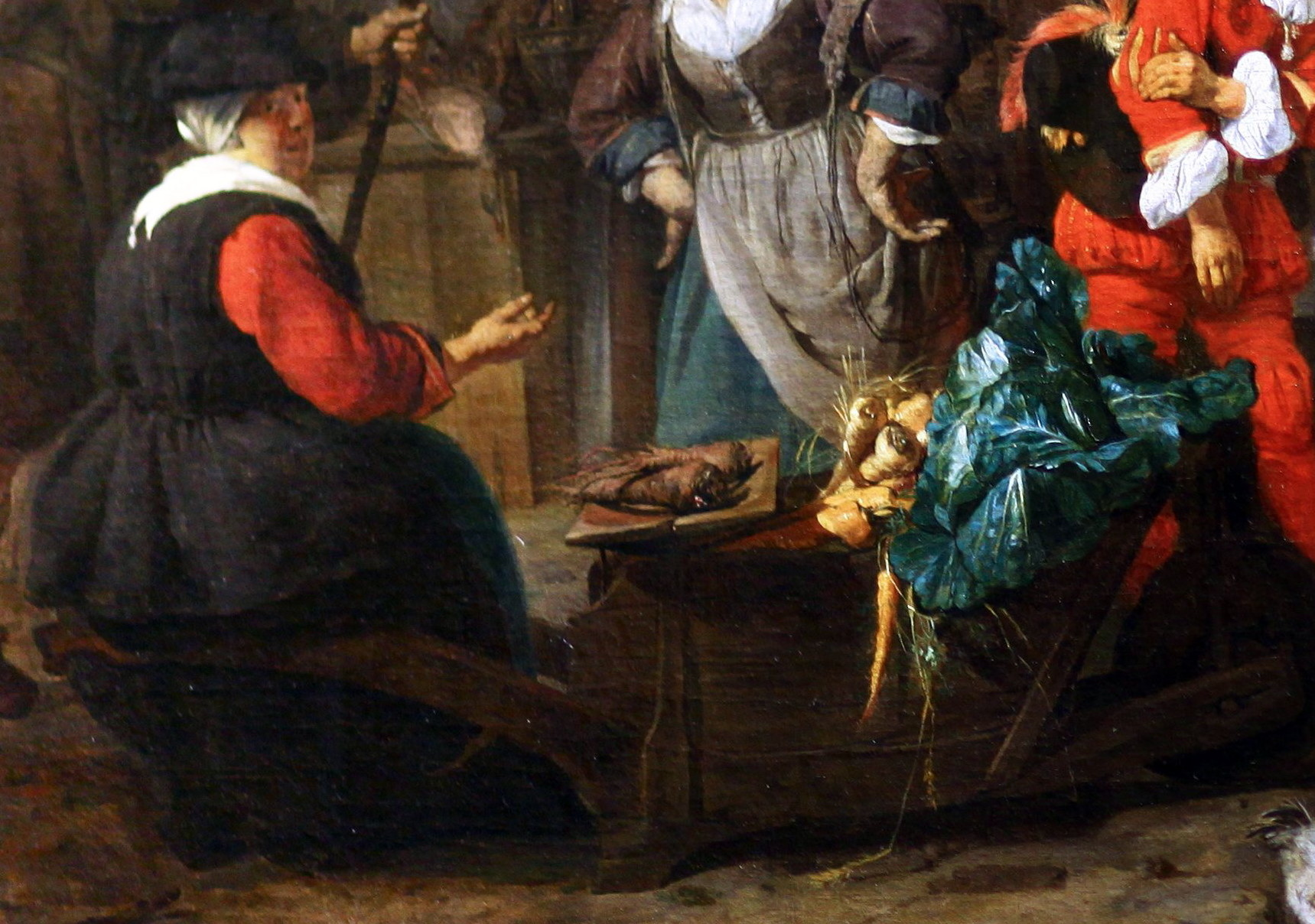
The marketwoman is seated on a wheelbarrow, and turns her head towards the viewer.

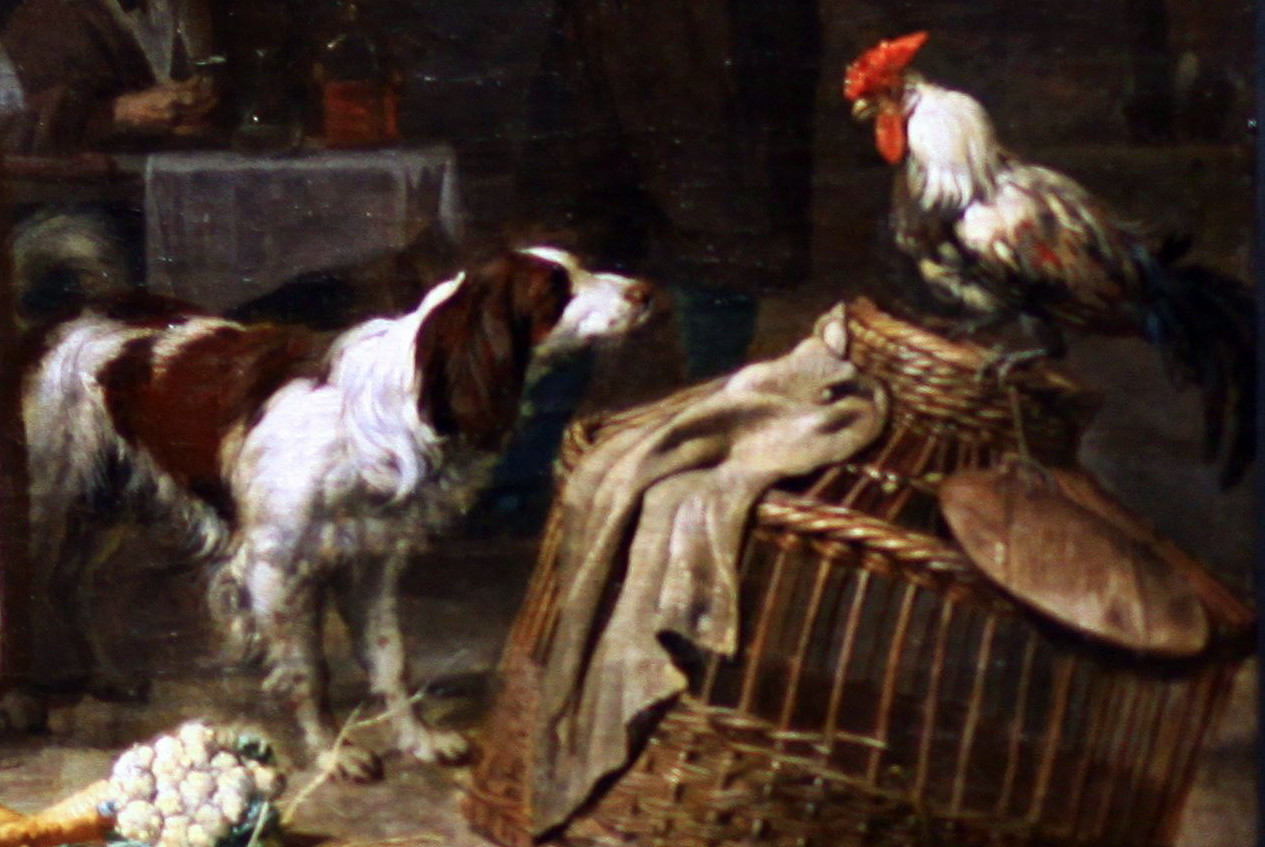
The dog might kill the rooster, which is tied with a string to its cage.

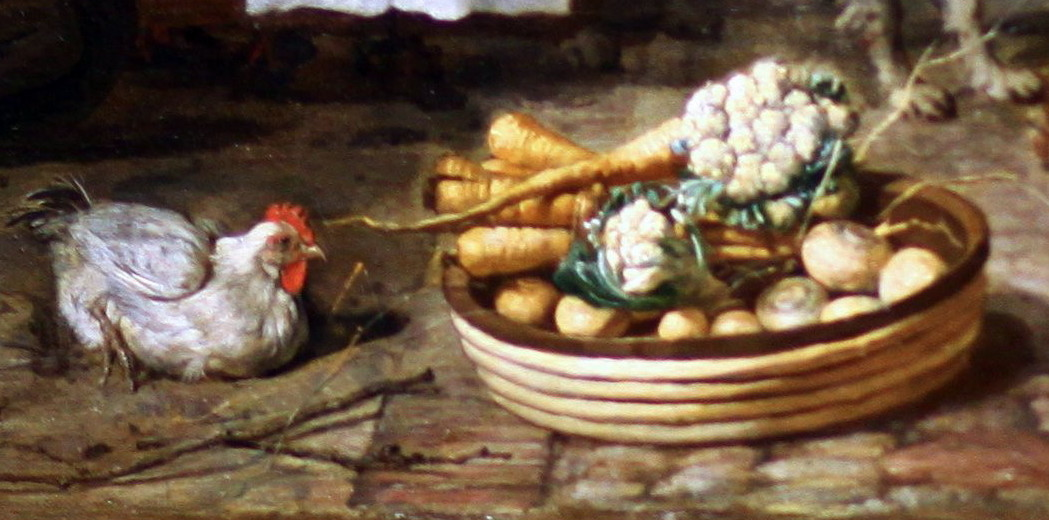
The chicken seems free but is sitting in mournful contemplation of the vegetables it will be cooked with.

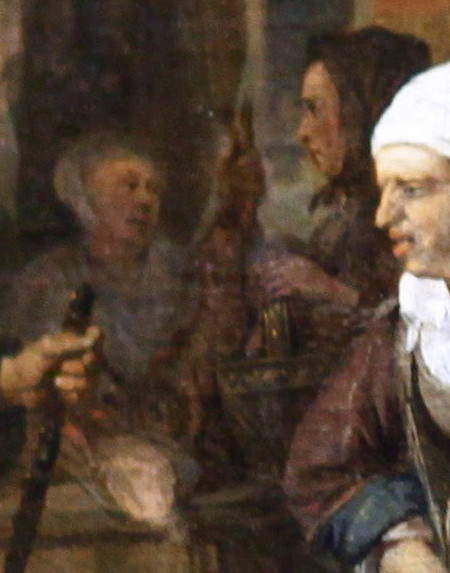
A customer buys a hare from a woman in a market stall

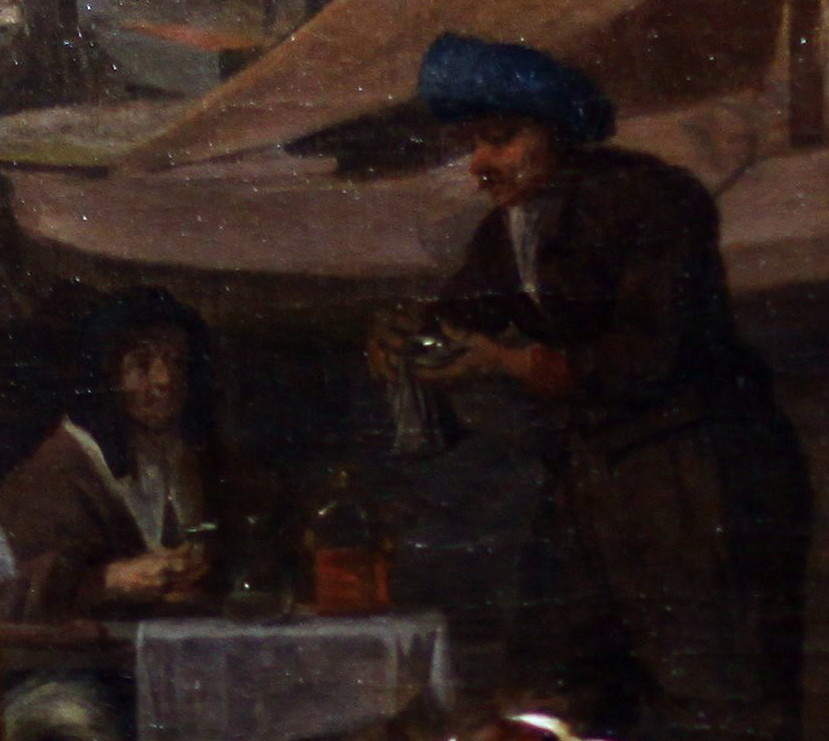
A seated woman watches a man in a turban attentively. He is possibly a quack or a tea seller.

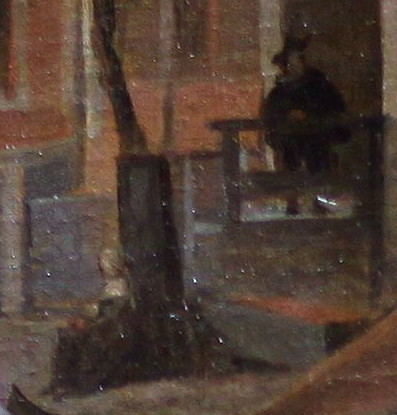
Across the canal a man and woman seem to be observing the market.

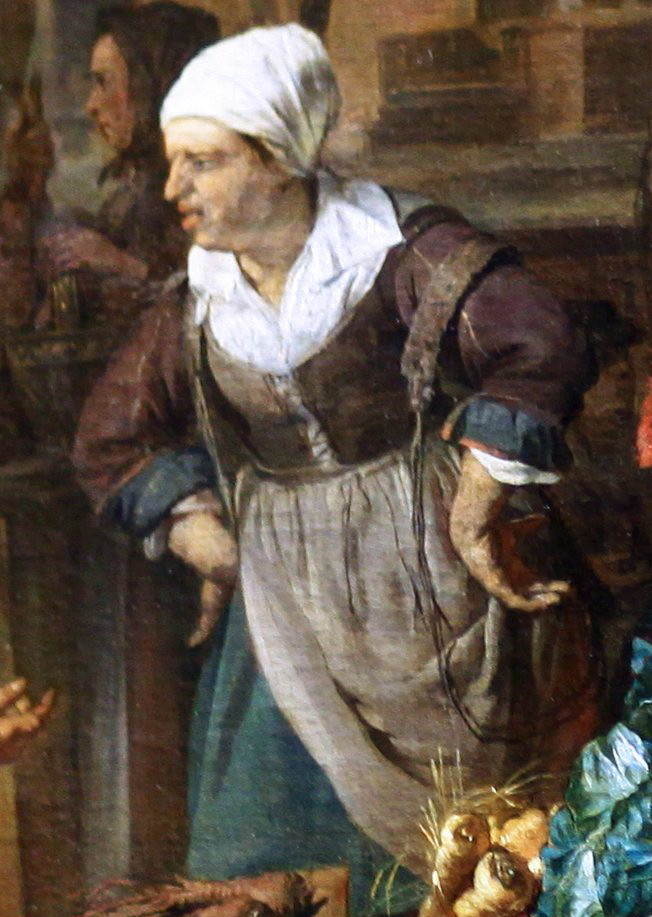
This woman is the owner of the wheelbarrow. She is wearing the straps she used to support the handles while walking with it.

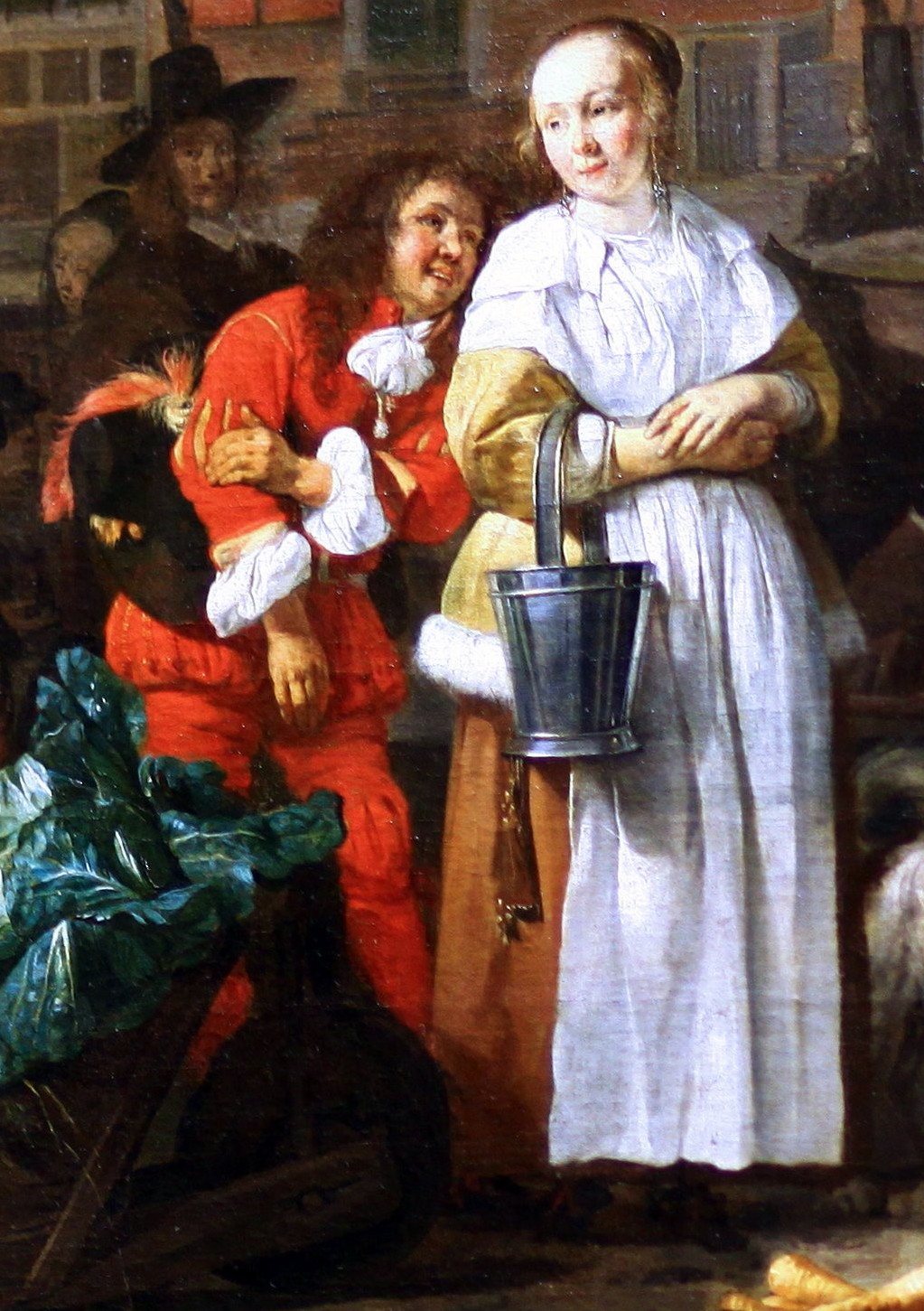
While a young woman waits for the poultry seller, a young man in theater costume speaks to her.

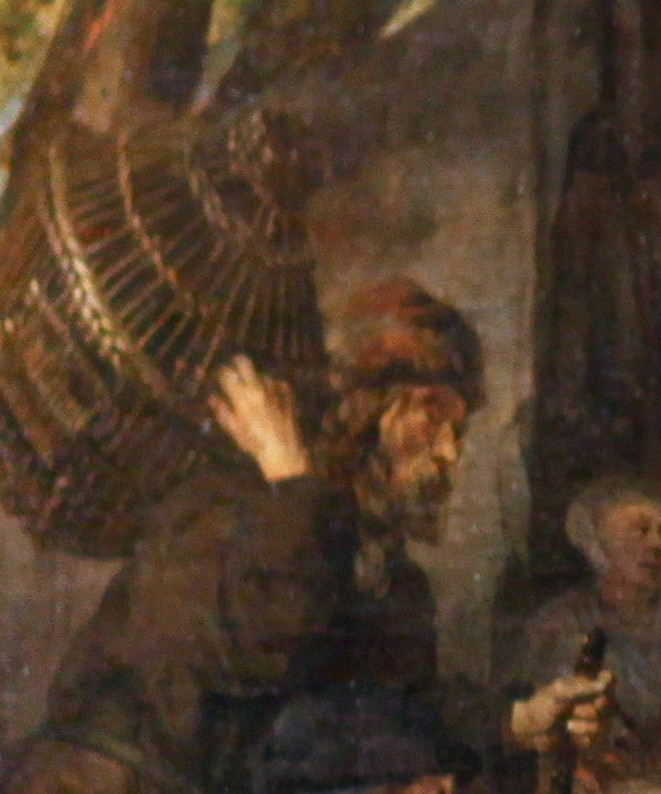
The poultry seller is carrying another load of chickens and looking at his customer.
