= Jacquemijntje Garniers =

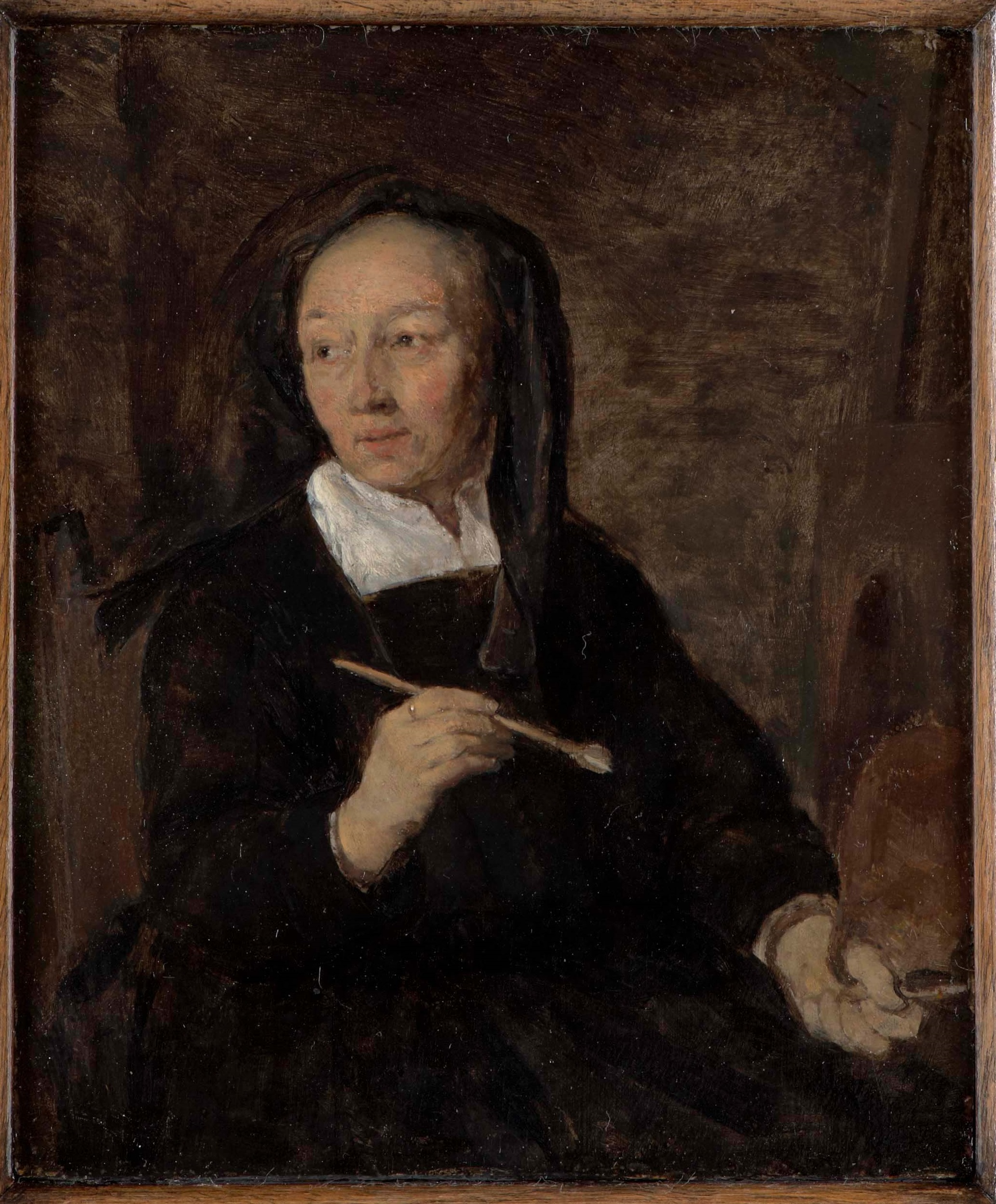
- Portrait of a female artist at her easel, circa 1660; said to be Metsu's portrait of his mother, but possibly of his mother-in-law Maria de Grebber
- Born: c. 1590; Ypres, West Flanders
- Died: 6 September 1651; Leiden, Holland, Dutch Republic
- Other names: Jacquemijntje le Foutere; Jacquemijntje Fermout; Jacquemijntje Metzu; Jacquemijntje Bontecraey
- Occupation: Midwife
- Years active: 1605—1651
- Spouses: Abraham Le Foutere (1608—?); Guillaume Fermout; Jacques Metsu (1625—1629); Cornelis Gerritsz Bontecraey (1636—?)
- Children: Gabriël Metsu

Jacquemijntje Garniers (c. 1590 — 8 September 1651) was a midwife, and possibly an amateur painter, from Ypres, West Flanders. She was widowed four times and had a total of four children, including the Dutch painter Gabriël Metsu. She was a city midwife in Leiden, in the modern province of South Holland, and also worked as an independent midwife. She died in Leiden and had silver objects and three houses in her possession at the time of her death.

== Biography ==
Garniers was born roughly in 1590, to Franchoyse Fremouts and Isack Garniers, in Ypres, West Flanders. She married Abraham Le Foutere on 5 June 1608, and they had 3 children. Foutere died around 1618, and Garniers remarried to Guillaume Fermout, an artist, nicknamed Strazio Voluto. While she was married to Fermout, she moved to Dordrecht, Netherlands, and was trained there as a midwife. In 1624, Fermout died, and Garniers subsequently moved to Leiden, South Holland, Netherlands.

In January 1624, Garniers became a midwife at Leiden after submitting a successful request to the court, but later decided to become an independent midwife. She married a third time on 10 November 1625, to Jacques Metsu, who, like Fermout, was an artist. The two of them had one child, Gabriël Metsu, who was raised as a Catholic. Gabriël painted a 29.5-by-24.5-inch (75 cm × 62 cm) portrait of Garniers, which was sold in 1845 in London. Another portrait of Garniers which Metsu painted was sold on May 9, 1881, in Paris.

On 6 March 1629, soon after Gabriël was born, Jacques died, leaving Garniers widowed again. In 1632, she asked to become a midwife of Leiden again and was accepted, with her salary being sixty guilders, twice the amount it was before. Her fourth husband was Cornelis Gerritsz Bontecraey, a skipper, whom she married on 14 September 1636. Bontecraey died in 1649, and Garniers became a widow for a fourth time. Garniers did not marry again after Bontecraey's death, but the skippers craft paid her two guilders a week so that she could help care for the four children she had. Garniers was able to acquire enough money to have three houses and multiple silver objects in her possession. She died in Leiden on 8 September 1651.

It is believed that Garnier was also an amateur oil painter. Although no paintings made by Garniers have been found, it is suspected that she painted due to her second and third husbands being artists.
