= The Lace-Maker (Metsu) =

Painting by Gabriël Metsu

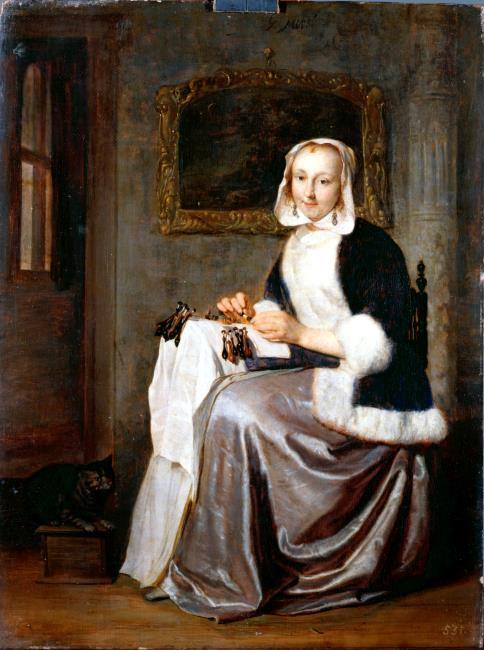
- Artist: Gabriël Metsu
- Year: 1663
- Medium: oil paint
- Dimensions: 35 cm (14 in) × 26.5 cm (10.4 in)
- Identifiers: RKDimages ID: 247220; Bildindex der Kunst und Architektur ID: 32001850

The Lace-Maker is an oil-on-canvas painting by the Dutch painter Gabriël Metsu, created c. 1663. It is an example of Dutch Golden Age painting and is part of the collection of Gemäldegalerie Alte Meister, in Dresden, Germany.

== Description ==
The woman is looking at the viewer and on her lap is a lace pillow for bobbin lace.

This is one of the Metsu paintings with the longest provenance in any collection today, first recorded in 1722. It was documented by Hofstede de Groot in 1914, who wrote:

79. THE LACE-MAKER. Sm. 112. In a room with an oil-painting on the grey wall, a lady is seated at work with a lace pillow on her lap. She wears a grey satin dress and a blue jacket trimmed with white fur. At her feet to the left is a cat.

Signed in full in the centre at the top; panel, 14 inches by 10 inches. In the Saxon inventory of 1722, A531.

Now in the Picture Gallery, Dresden, 1902 catalogue, No. 1736.

== Popular culture ==
In 1959 this painting was featured on a stamp in East Germany.

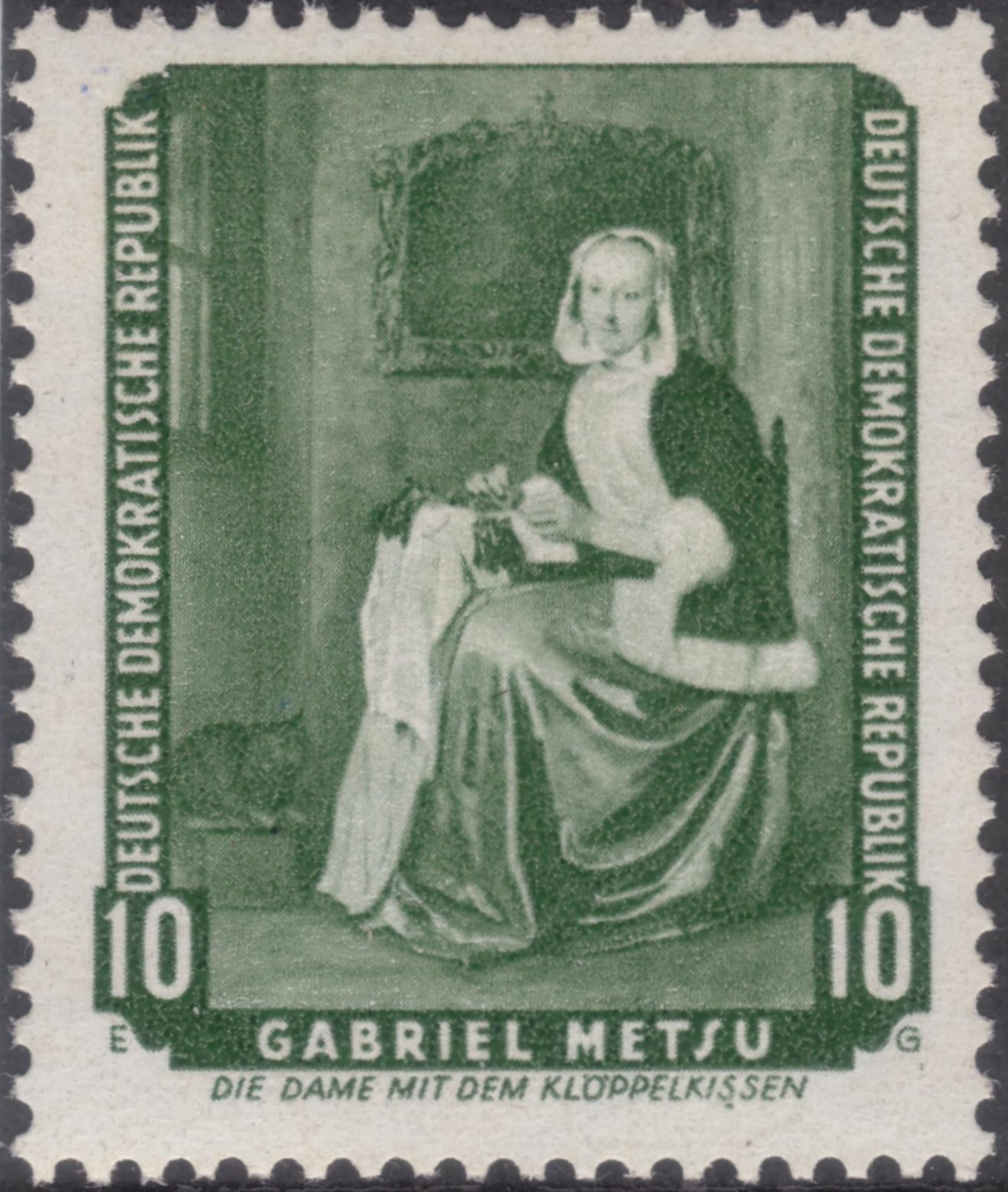
