= Gabriël Metsu =

Dutch painter (1629–1667)

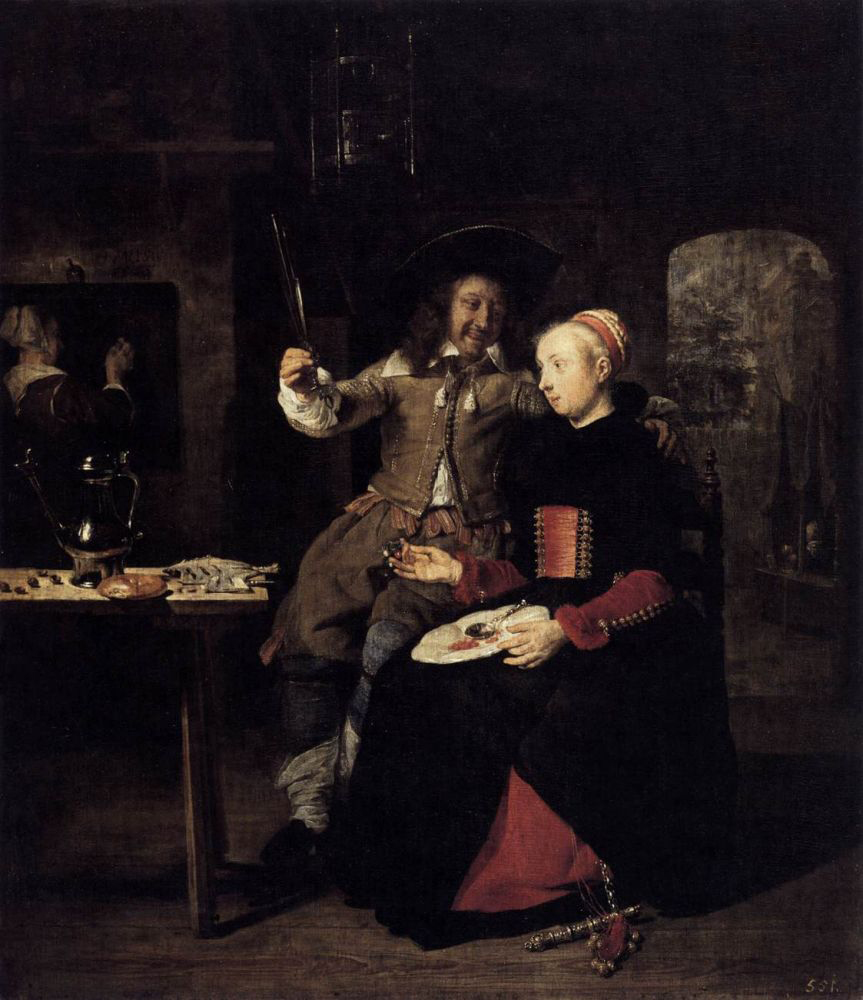
- Gabriël Metsu self-portrait, with his wife, in an inn (1661)
- Born: 1629; Leiden, Dutch Republic
- Died: Buried 24 October 1667 (aged 37–38); Amsterdam, Dutch Republic
- Known for: Painting

Gabriël Metsu (Dutch: [ˈɣaːbriˌɛl ˈmɛtsy]; 1629–1667) was a Dutch painter of history paintings, still lifes, portraits, and genre works. He was "a highly eclectic artist, who did not adhere to a consistent style, technique, or one type of subject for long periods". Only 14 of his 133 works are dated.

== Life ==
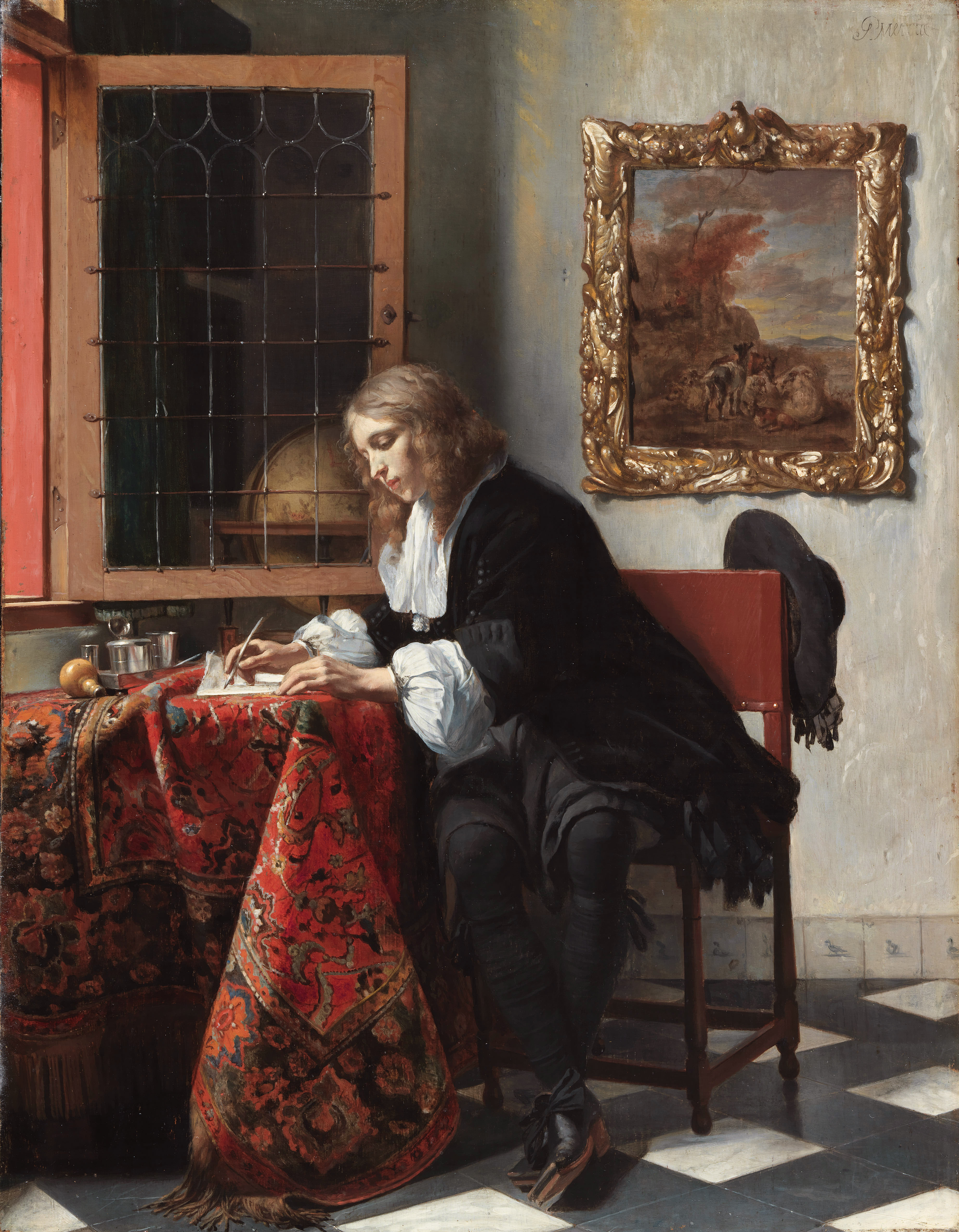
Man Writing a Letter (1662–1665) (National Gallery of Ireland, Dublin)

Gabriël Metsu was the son of Jacques Metsu (c. 1588 – March 1629), a tapestry worker and painter originally from Hainault, who lived most of his days in Leiden, and Jacquemijntje Garniers (c. 1590 – 8 September 1651), the widow of a painter with three children of her own. It is not known when and where Gabriel was baptized; most likely in a Catholic hidden church but the baptismal records did not survive. Gabriel grew up on Lange Mare and his stepfather, a skipper, must have supported his education, because his mother was a poor midwife.

In 1648 Metsu was registered among the first members of the painters' guild at Leiden, but in 1650 he ceased to be subscribed. Metsu was possibly trained in Utrecht by the Catholic painters Nicolaus Knüpfer and Jan Weenix.

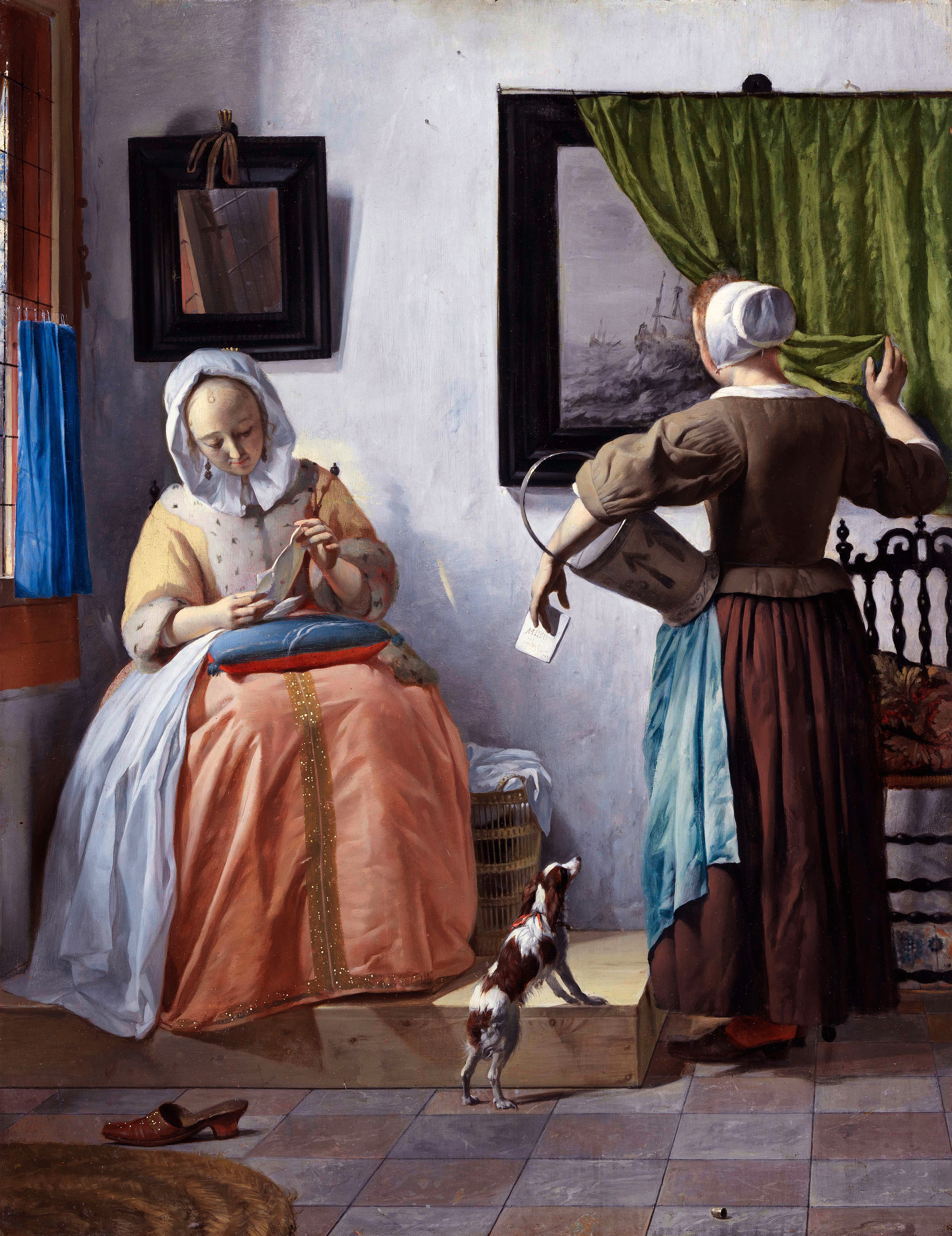
The pendant Woman Reading a Letter, (1665) (National Gallery of Ireland, Dublin)

Around 1655 Metsu moved to Amsterdam; he lived in an alley on Prinsengracht, next to a brewery and near his relatives, the children of the sugar refiner Philips Metsu. In 1657 he got into an argument with a neighbor. (It was alleged that Metsu left a brothel at six in the morning.) Gabriel moved to a house on the canal side, where a daily vegetable market was held. In 1658 he married Isabella de Wolff, whose father was a potter and mother the painter Maria de Grebber.

At the onset of the 1660s Metsu turned for inspiration to the art of the "fijnschilders" from his native Leiden. Metsu was responding to the market of Dou's paintings, who sold his paintings all over for exorbitant prices. Metsu may have also influenced Pieter de Hooch.

For a while Metsu trained Michiel van Musscher and Joost van Geel. Metsu died at the age of 38 and was buried in the Nieuwe Kerk. Three bells were tolled; a habit in use with Dutch Catholics at that time. His widow left for Enkhuizen, to live with her mother. Isabella was buried in the Zuiderkerk in 1718.

== Style and works ==
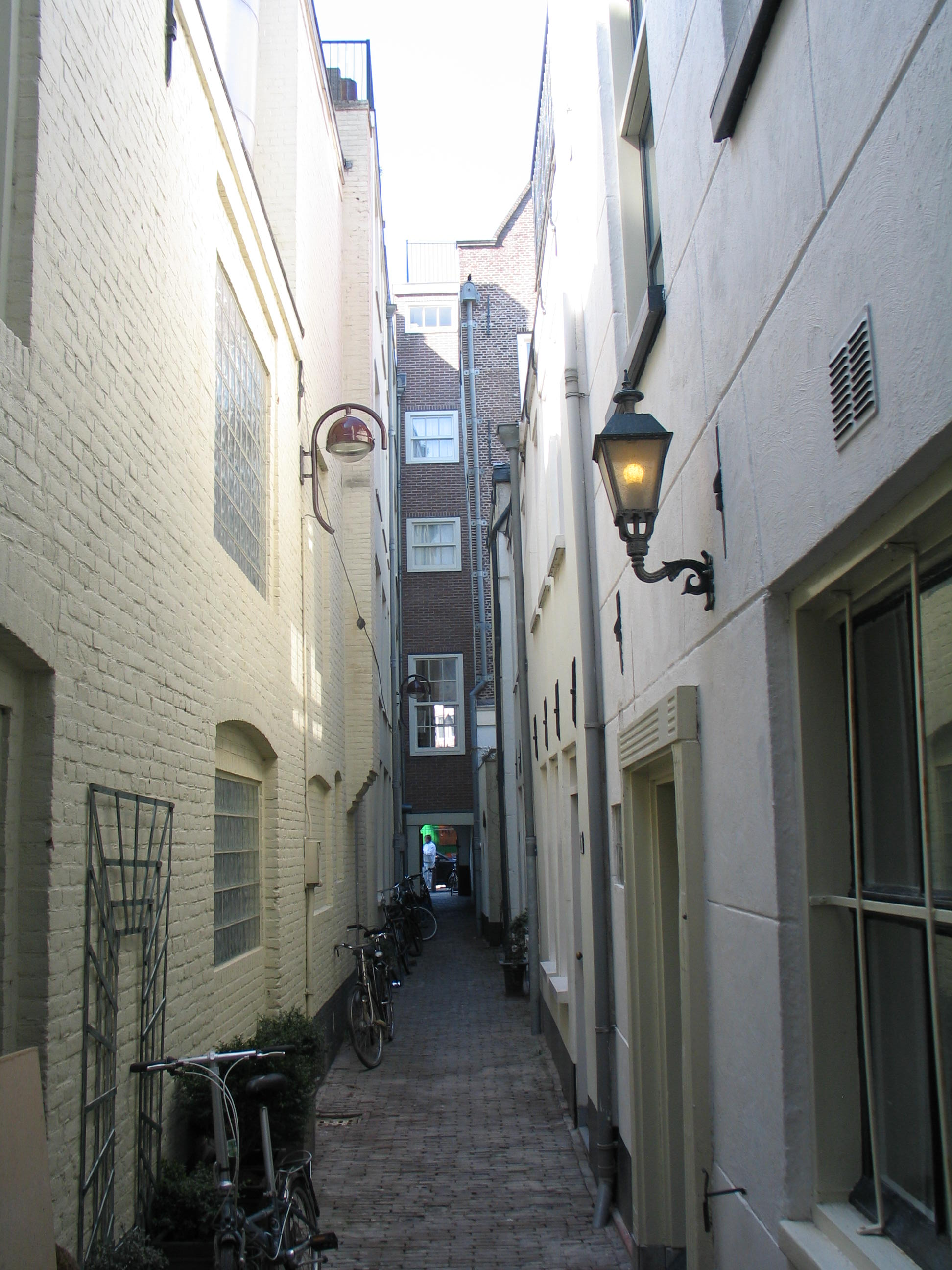
An alley on Prinsengracht 369 close to where Metsu lived between number 351 and 353

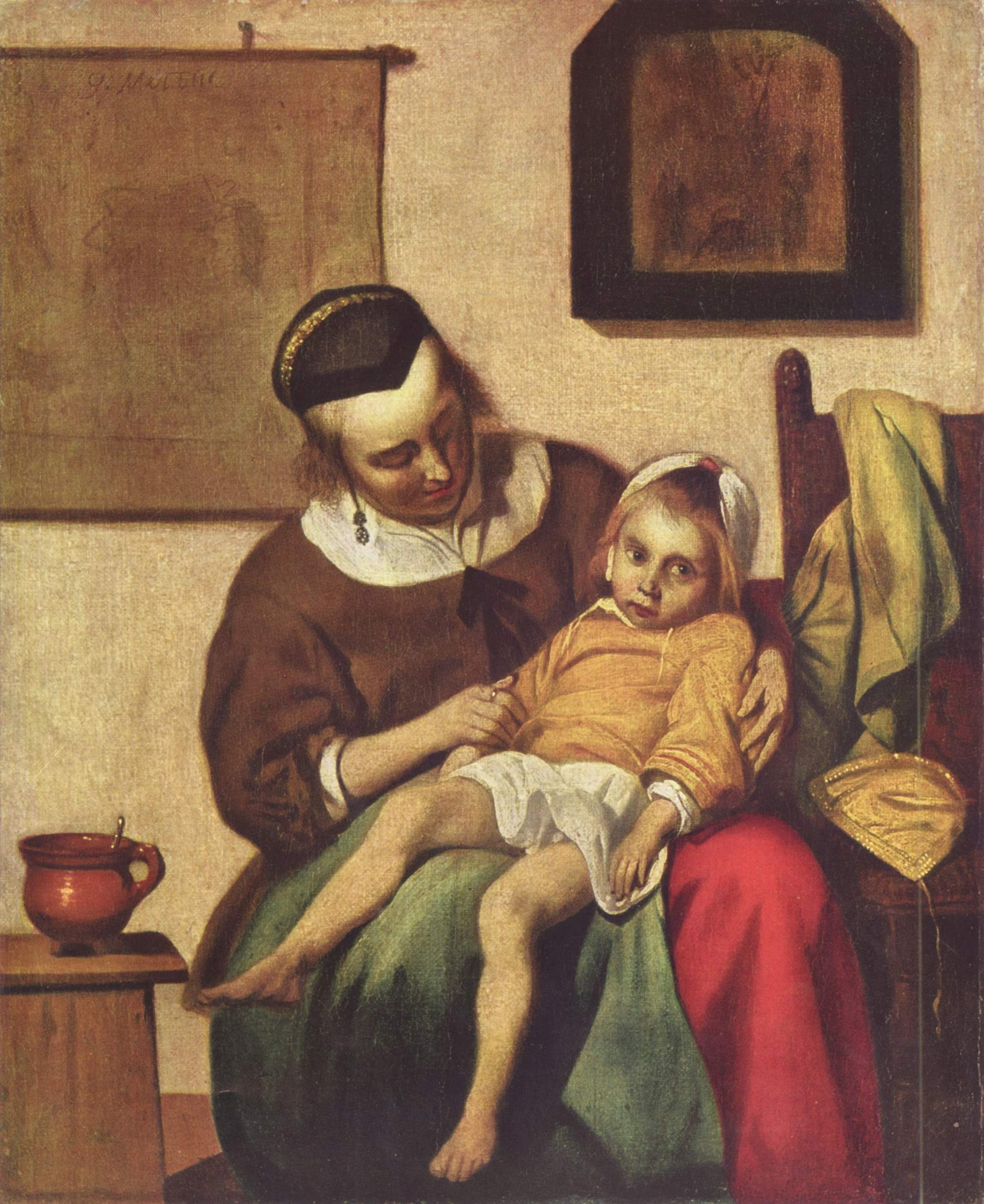
The Sick Child

According to Arnold Houbraken, Metsu was taught by Gerard Dou, though prior to about 1653 his influence is not apparent. One of his earliest pictures is The Rich Man and Lazarus at the Strasbourg Museum, painted under the influence of Jan Steen. Under the influence of Rembrandt he produced the Woman taken in Adultery, (1653) a large picture in the Louvre. To the same period belong the Dismissal of Hagar, in the Museum De Lakenhal, Leiden, and the Widow's Mite at the Schwerin Gallery.

Around 1653–1654, Metsu began placing his figures in domestic interiors and specialized in genre scenes on small panels. Old people were among Metsu's favorite thematic borrowings from Dou during his first years in Amsterdam. Metsu often painted young (single) women who either fed pets, sold goods at market (fruit, vegetables, fish, poultry, or meat), or were grocery-shopping themselves for these provisions. Another significant painting from this period was The Vegetable Market in Amsterdam, in the Louvre, for which the Encyclopædia Britannica Eleventh Edition praised ", the characteristic movement and action of the dramatis personae, the selection of faces, the expression and the gesture, and the texture of the things depicted".

Houbraken ends his biography with the comment that he was "of impeccable reputation", but he may have meant this ironically. Often, the subject of a Metsu painting was based on a popular emblem from an emblem book. This can give the painting a double meaning, such as in The Poultry seller, 1662, showing an old man offering a rooster to a young girl in a symbolic pose that is based on a lewd engraving by Gillis van Breen (1595–1622), with the same scene. The accompanying verse is:

"Hoe duur dees vogel vogelaer?" "hy is vercocht" "waer?"

How much for the bird, birdman? It's sold. Where?

"aen een waerdinne clear, die ick vogel tgeheele Jaer."

To an innkeeper, to whom I sell birds/that I have sex with the whole year through.

— Gillis van Breen after C. Clock. De vogelverkoper (gravure). Rijksprentenkabinet, Amsterdam.

The Sick Child in Rijksmuseum from c. 1664 "prompts the thought that Metsu strongly admired Vermeer's work. [The latter's Woman with a Water Jug was sold as a Metsu in 1877.] It also provides us with a hint about what he thought was lacking in Vermeer's paintings: emotional involvement of the viewer". This is in compliance with other painting, The Doctor's Visit, where there is emotional involvement in the painting of a tragic event involving the ill woman.

One of the finest collection of Metsu paintings was owned by Gerrit Braamcamp in the 18th century; he owned eight of them, including "man writing" and "woman reading a letter".

=== Carpets ===
At least thirteen of his paintings show carpets and he probably used the same model. He included several fine examples of minutely depicted floral and cloud band carpets in his works and even a silk oriental rug, as well as so-called "lotto" rugs which he for some reason, in contrast to his meticulous rendering of the floral carpets, depicted only in a very sketchy fashion.

== Two paintings of the Hinlopen family ==
Around the year 1661, Metsu won the patronage of the Amsterdam cloth merchant Jan J. Hinlopen and painted his family more than once in a fashionable surrounding. There is still some confusion about two paintings by Metsu — the Portrait of the family Hinlopen, now in the Gemäldegalerie, which for a few decades was referred to as The Family of burgomaster Gillis Valckenier, and Visit to the Nursery — in the Metropolitan Museum. There is some general resemblance. The latter belonged to Jan J. Hinlopen.

=== Visit to the Nursery ===
In 1662 Jan Vos published a poem about this painting. It might depict the Hinlopen family, but as the sitters have not been identified this painting it is more a genre work than a portrait. In 1721 Arnold Houbraken recalled the latter painting as the largest and finest work by Metsu he had ever seen. Franits calls it one of his most intriguing images. What makes this painting especially interesting is its provenance. The provenance is well-known, except for between the years 1666 and 1706. In 1680, after the burial of his brother and guardian Jacob J. Hinlopen the paintings were divided in lots and given to his daughters but none of the paintings or painters is mentioned.

The scene is set in an imaginary room of unrealistically large proportions. The father gestures deferentially while a maid dutifully fetches a chair for this esteemed visitor. The chimney resembles the one in the "schepenzaal" of former Amsterdam townhall, also painted by Pieter de Hooch. There is a seascape on the wall and Persian carpets on the table and the floor. The carpet on the table is divided into compartments, which are partly vermilion red and partly purple red, and shield-shaped. The dark blue color of the borders on the carpet are relatively unusual. The dog in the painting could be a Bolognese dog. Hung in the reception room of Hinlopen's home, the Visit to the Nursery thus alluded to his powerful role in local politics.

== Works ==
Gabriël Metsu's paintings

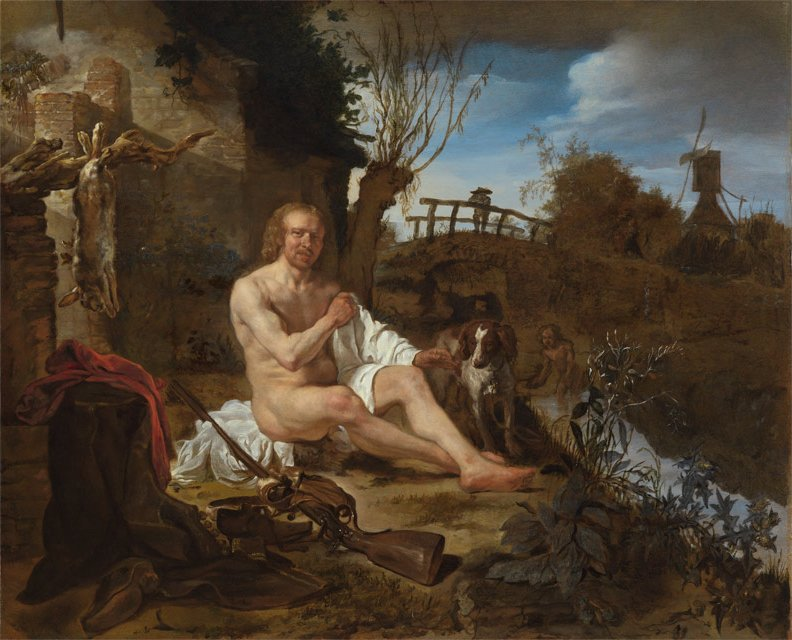
A Hunter Getting Dressed after Bathing, c. 1654-1656

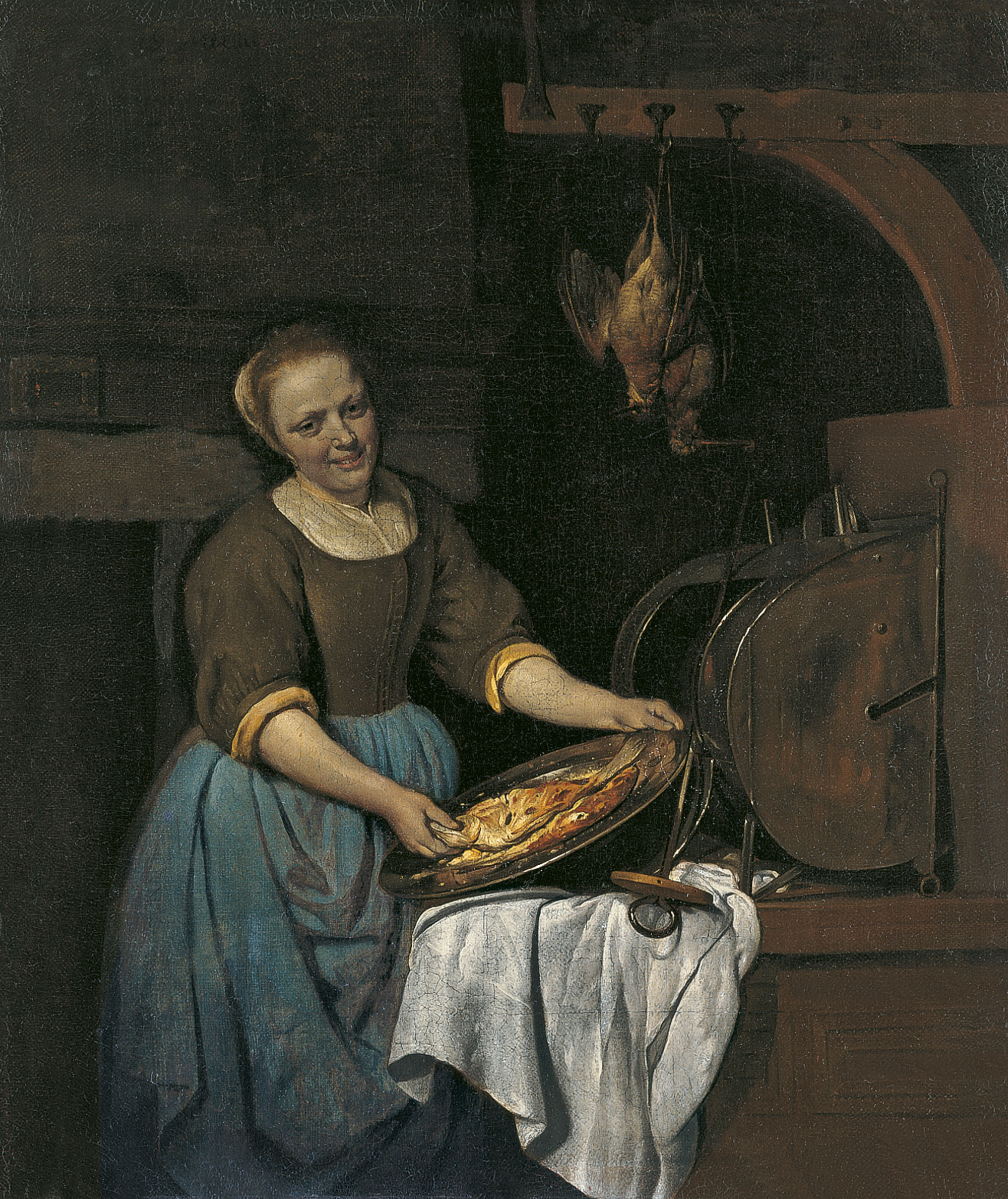
The Cook, 1657

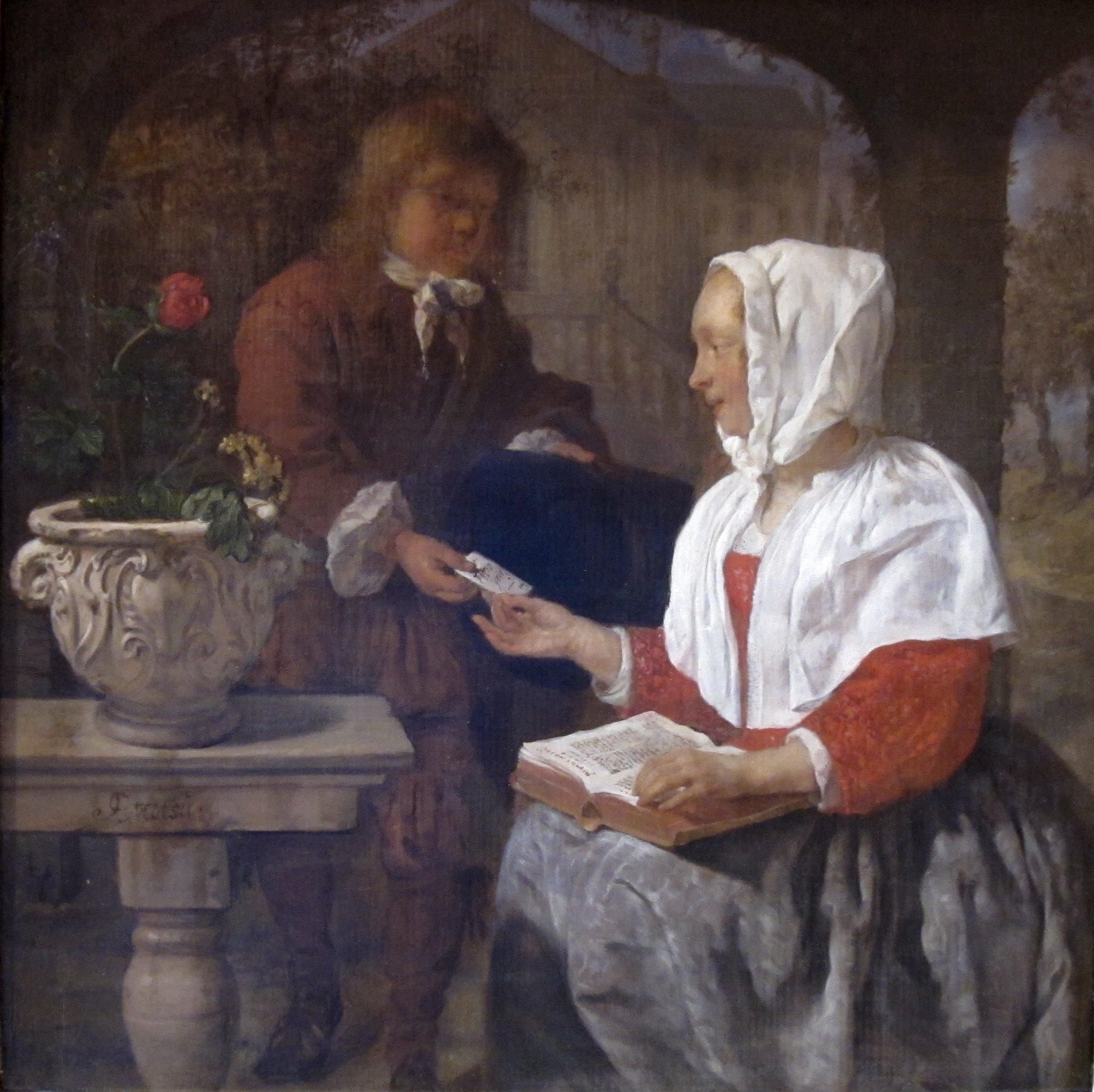
A Girl Receiving a Letter, 1658

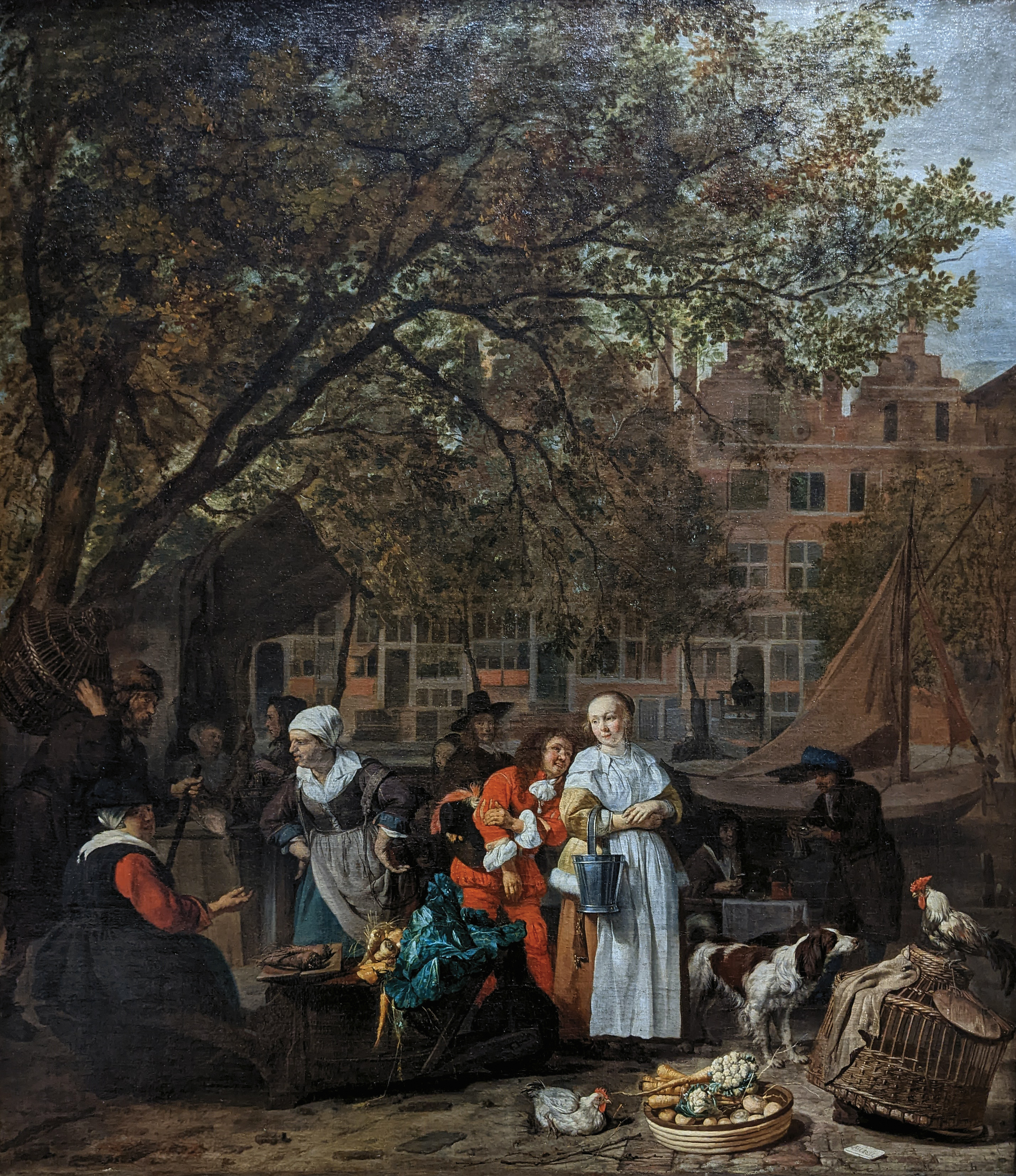
The Vegetable Market in Amsterdam, c. 1660–1

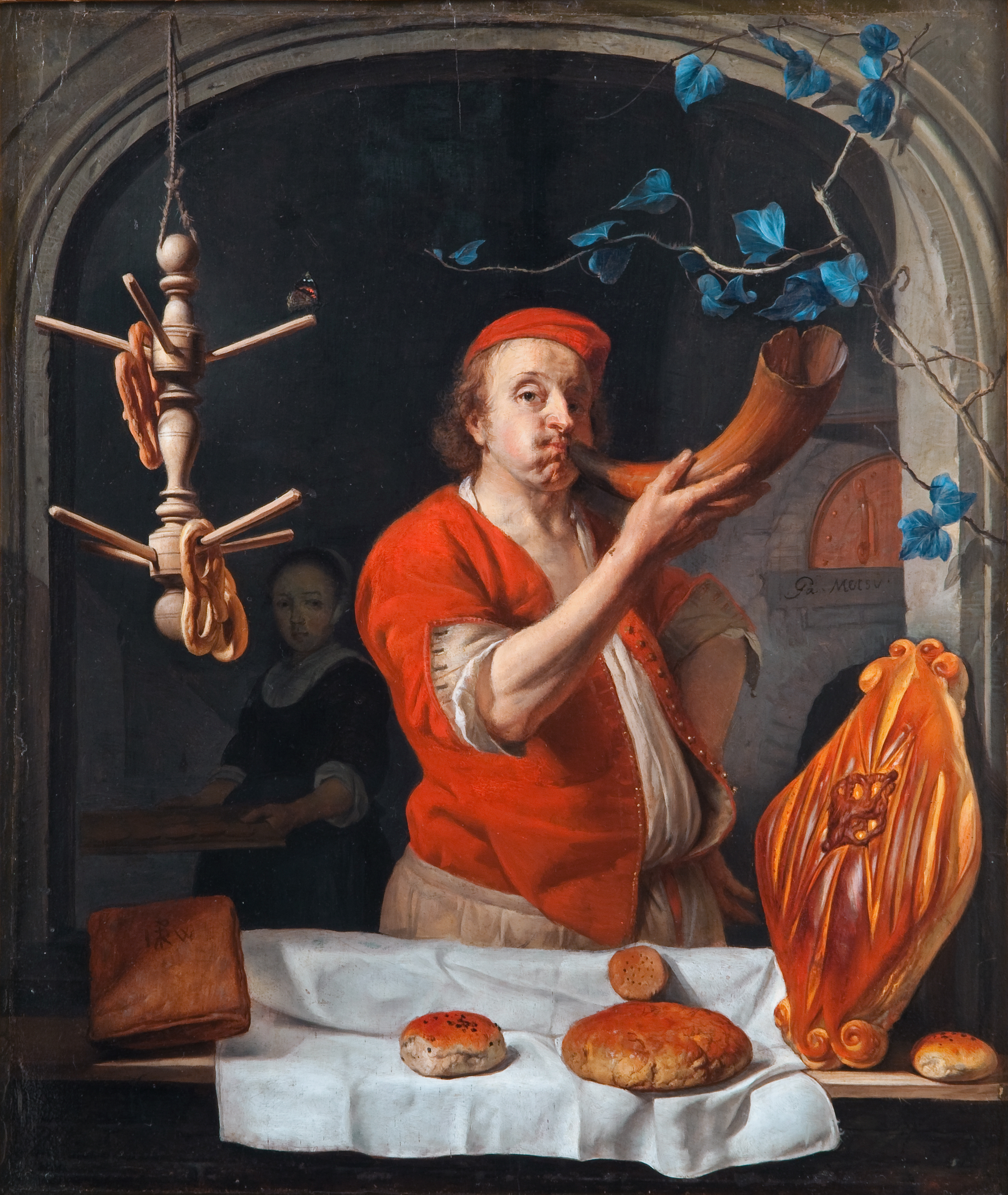
A Baker Blowing his Horn, c. 1660-3

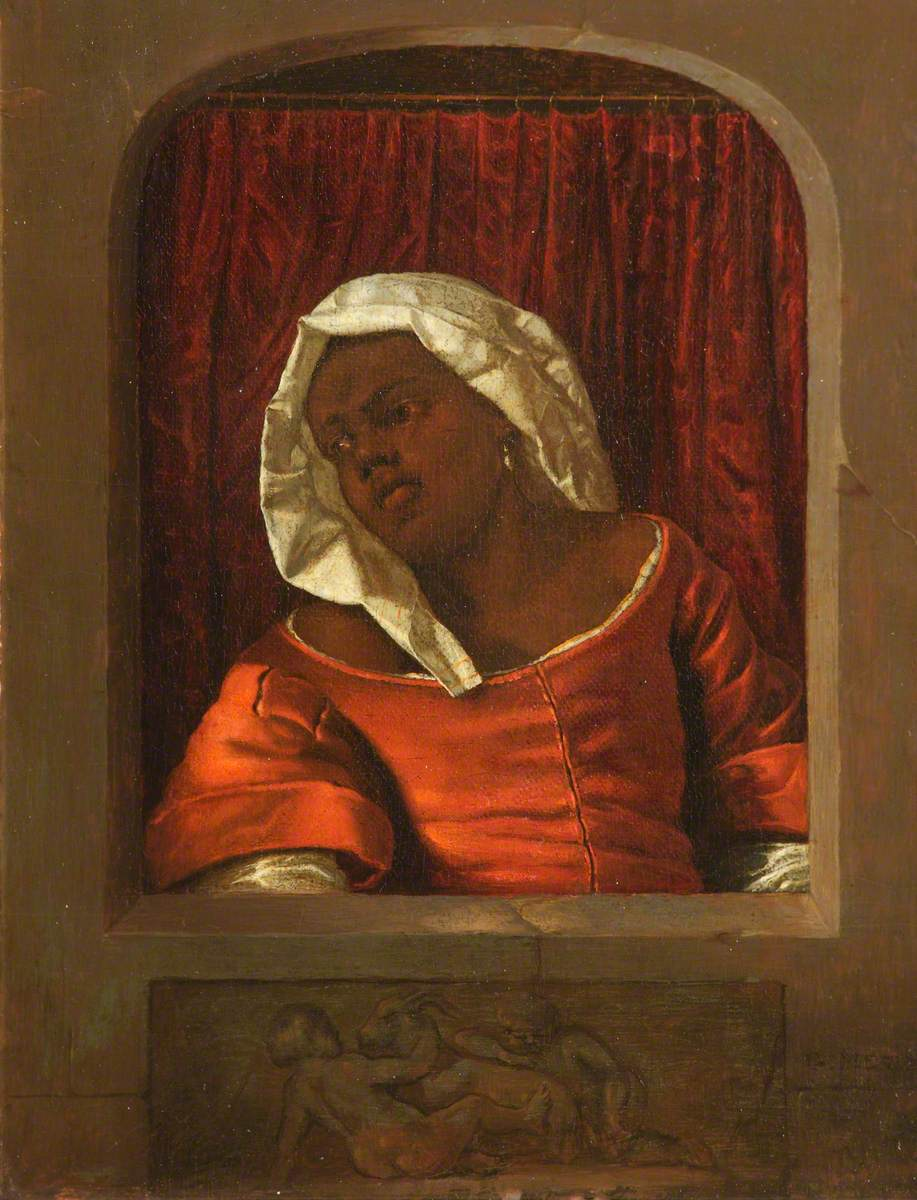
Portrait of a Lady in Red, 1667

The Intruder c. 1661

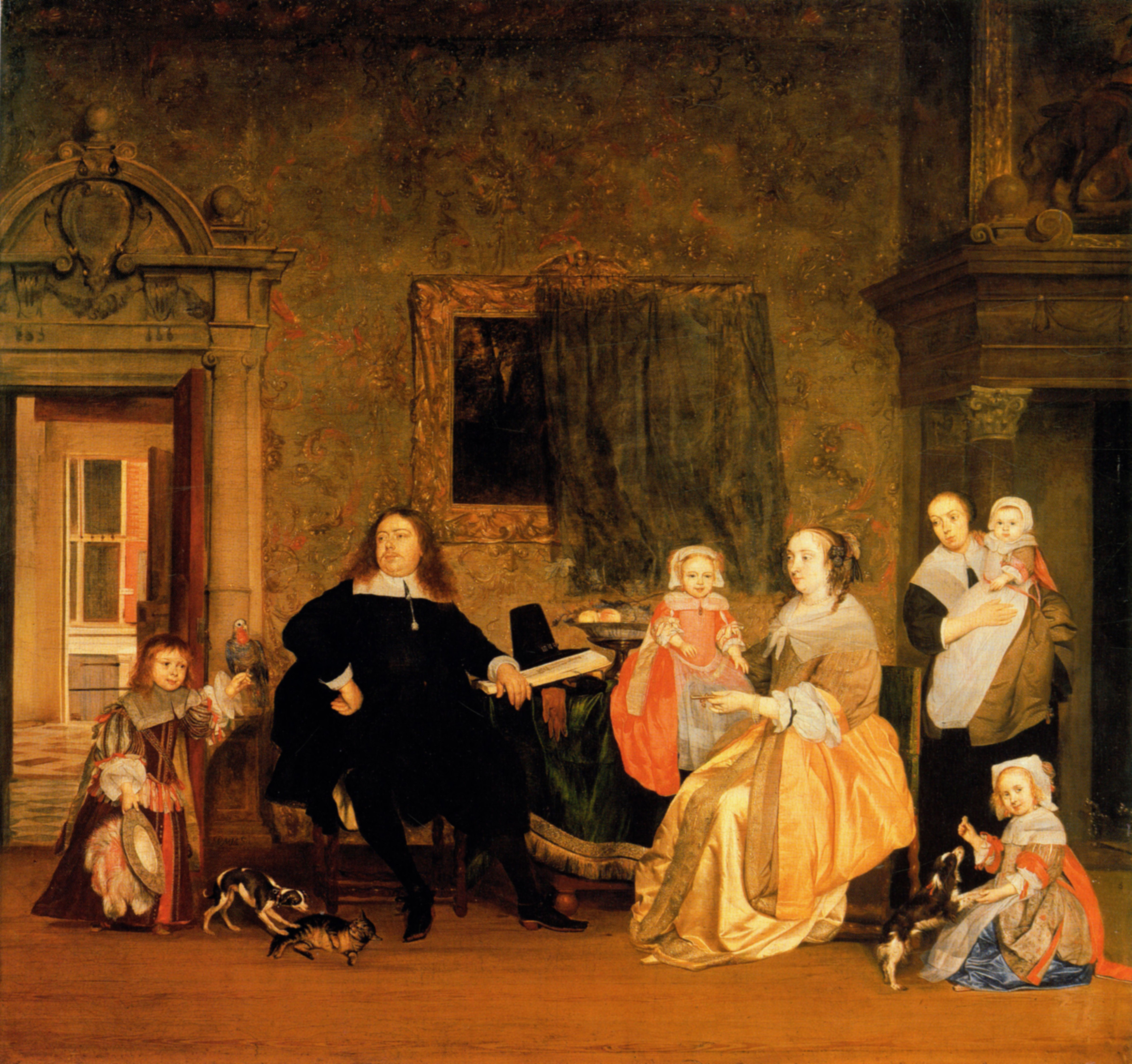
The Hinlopen family c. 1662

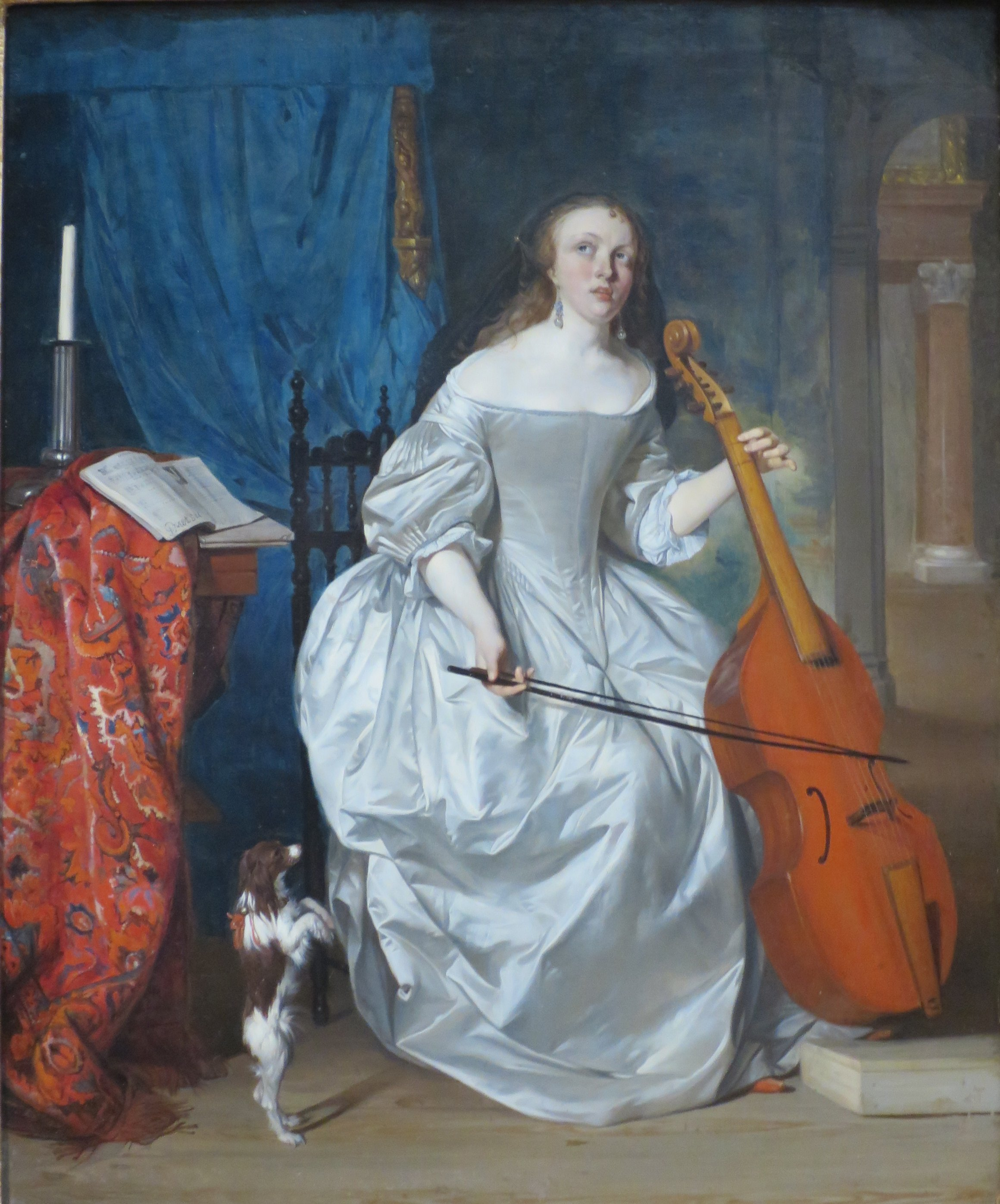
Woman Playing a Viola de gamba, 1663

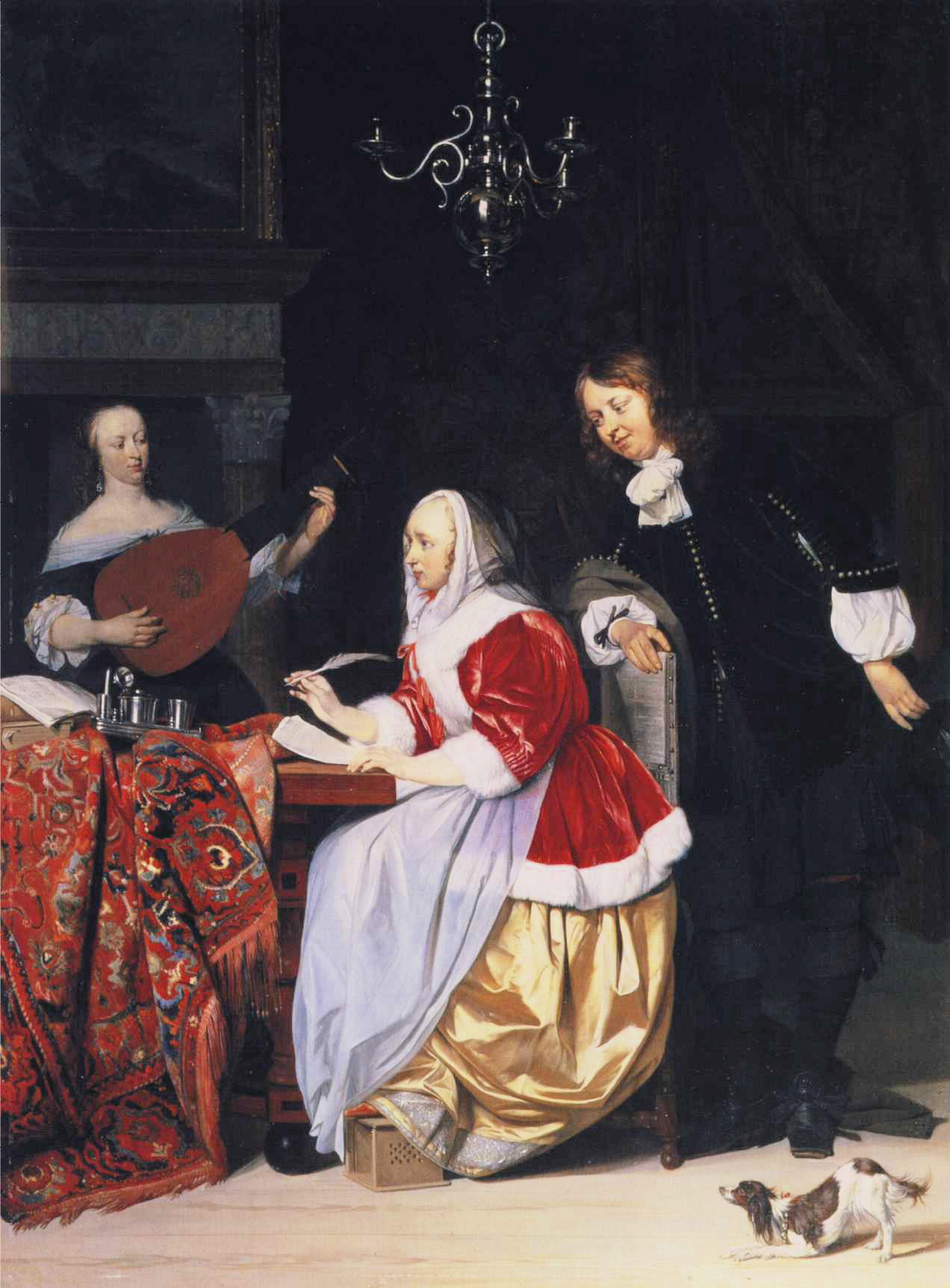
A Young Woman Composing Music and a Curious Man 1662-1663

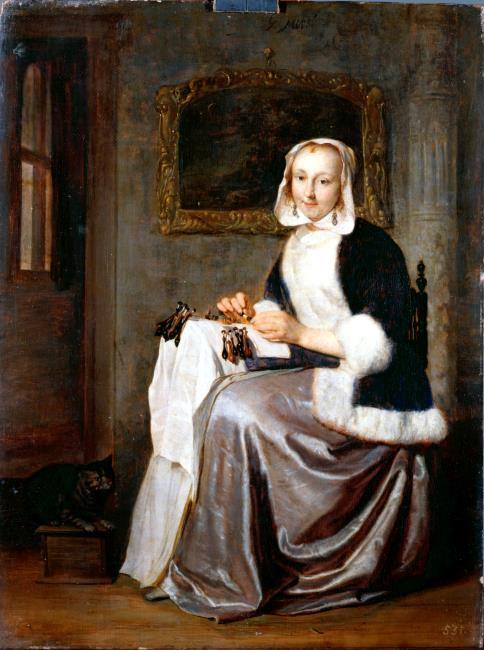
The Lacemaker, 1663

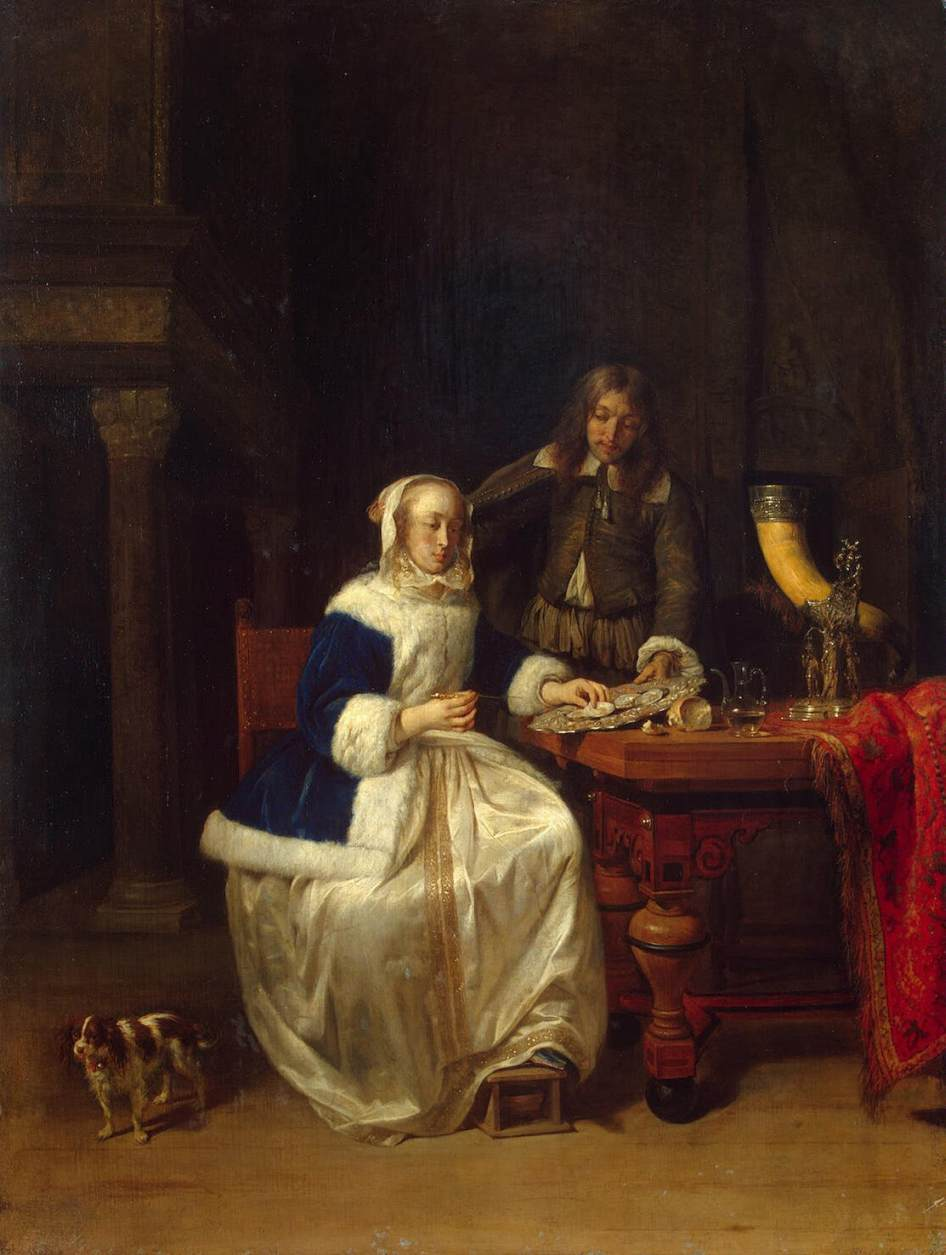
Young Couple at Breakfast by Gabriël Metsu

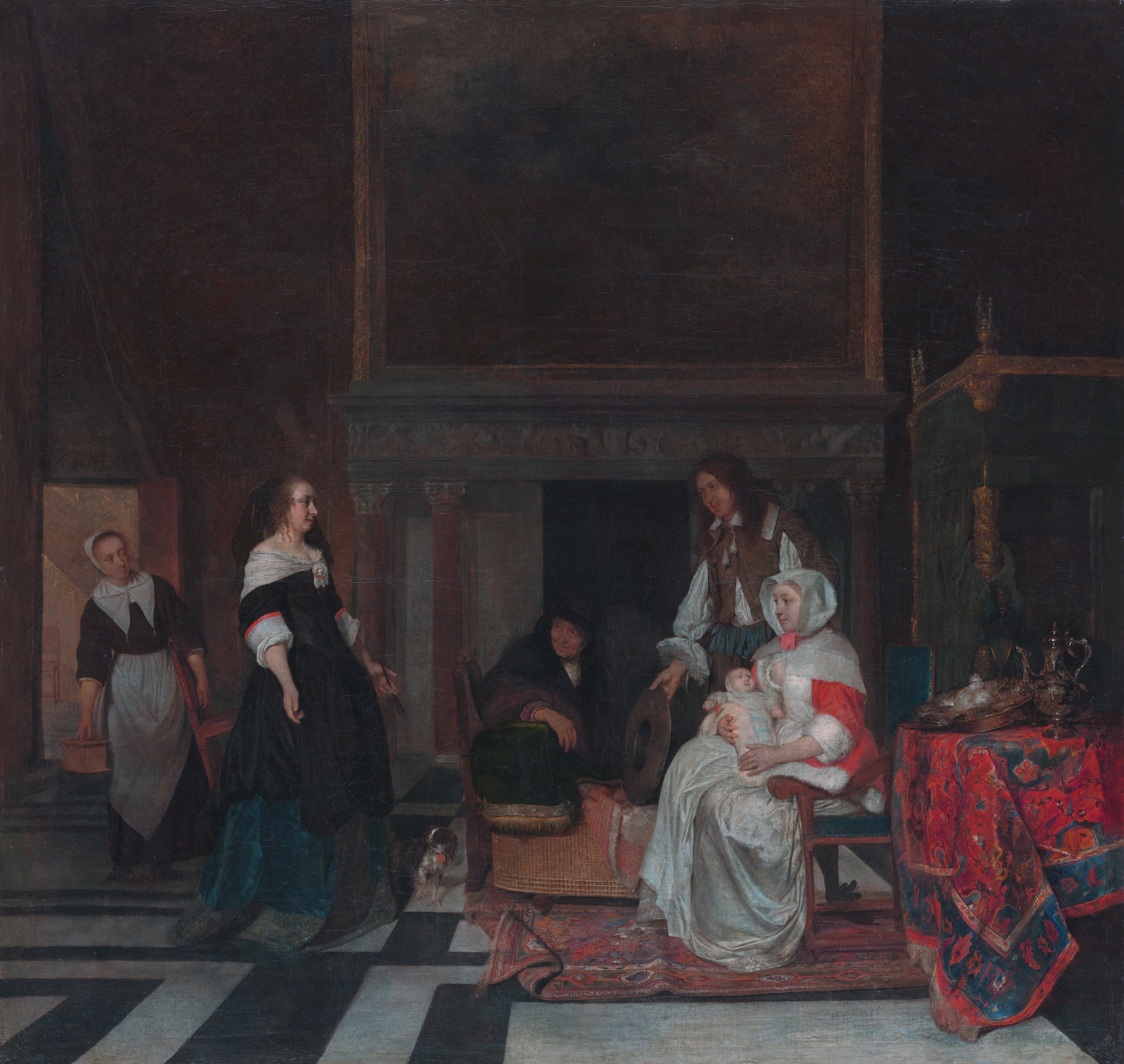
The Visit to the Nursery (1661)

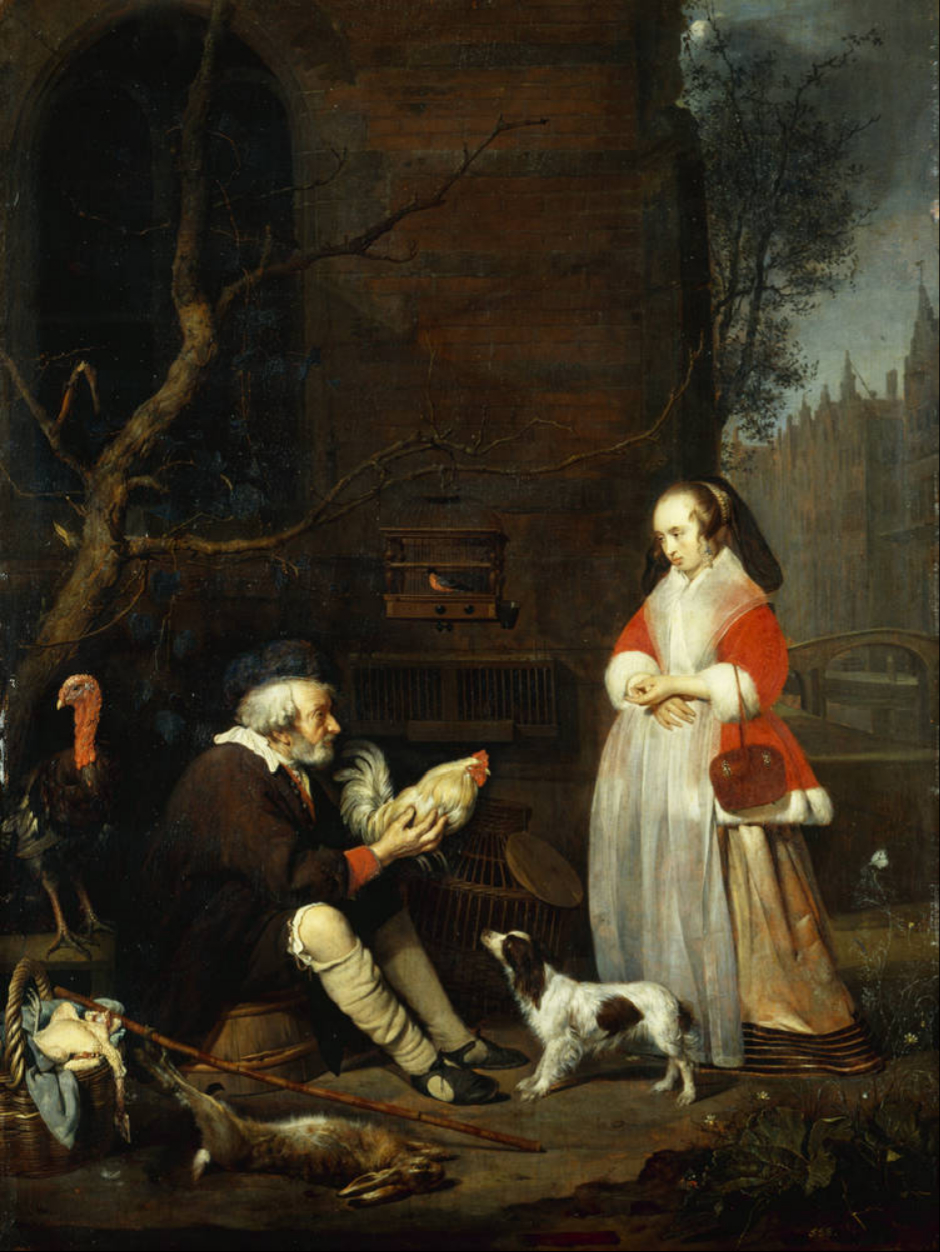
The Poultry-Seller, 1662

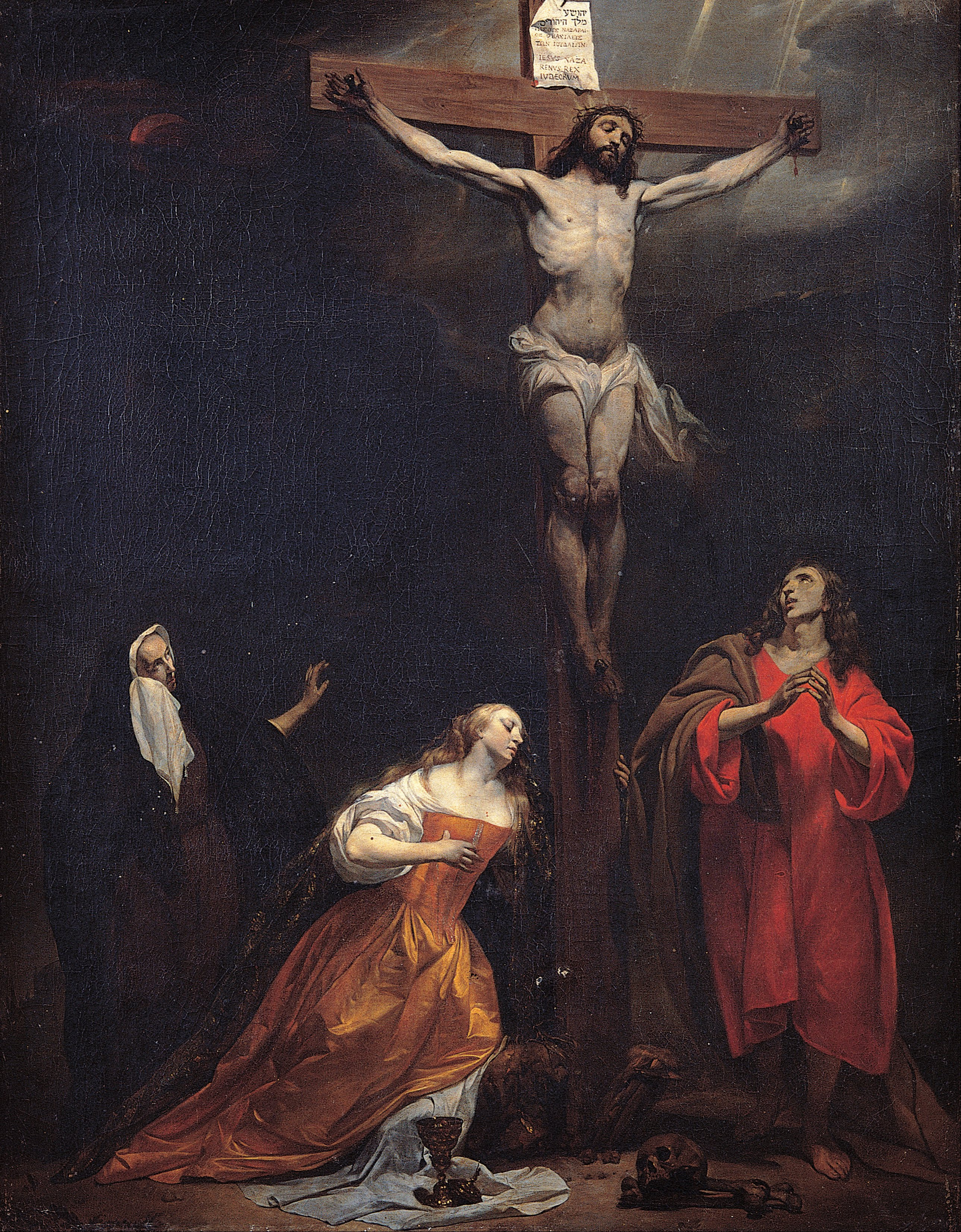
Crucifixion

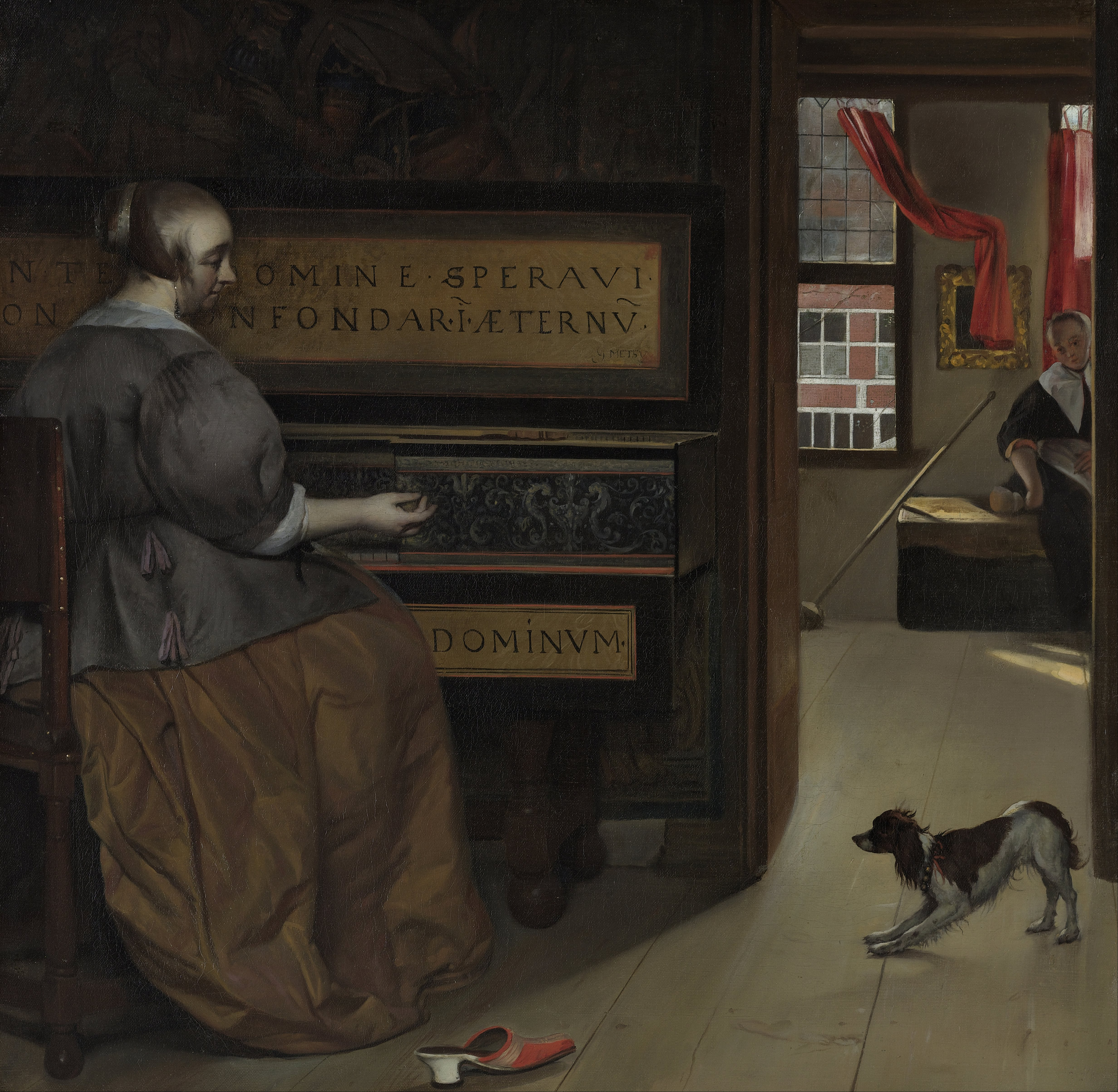
Lady at a Virginal, 1660-1667

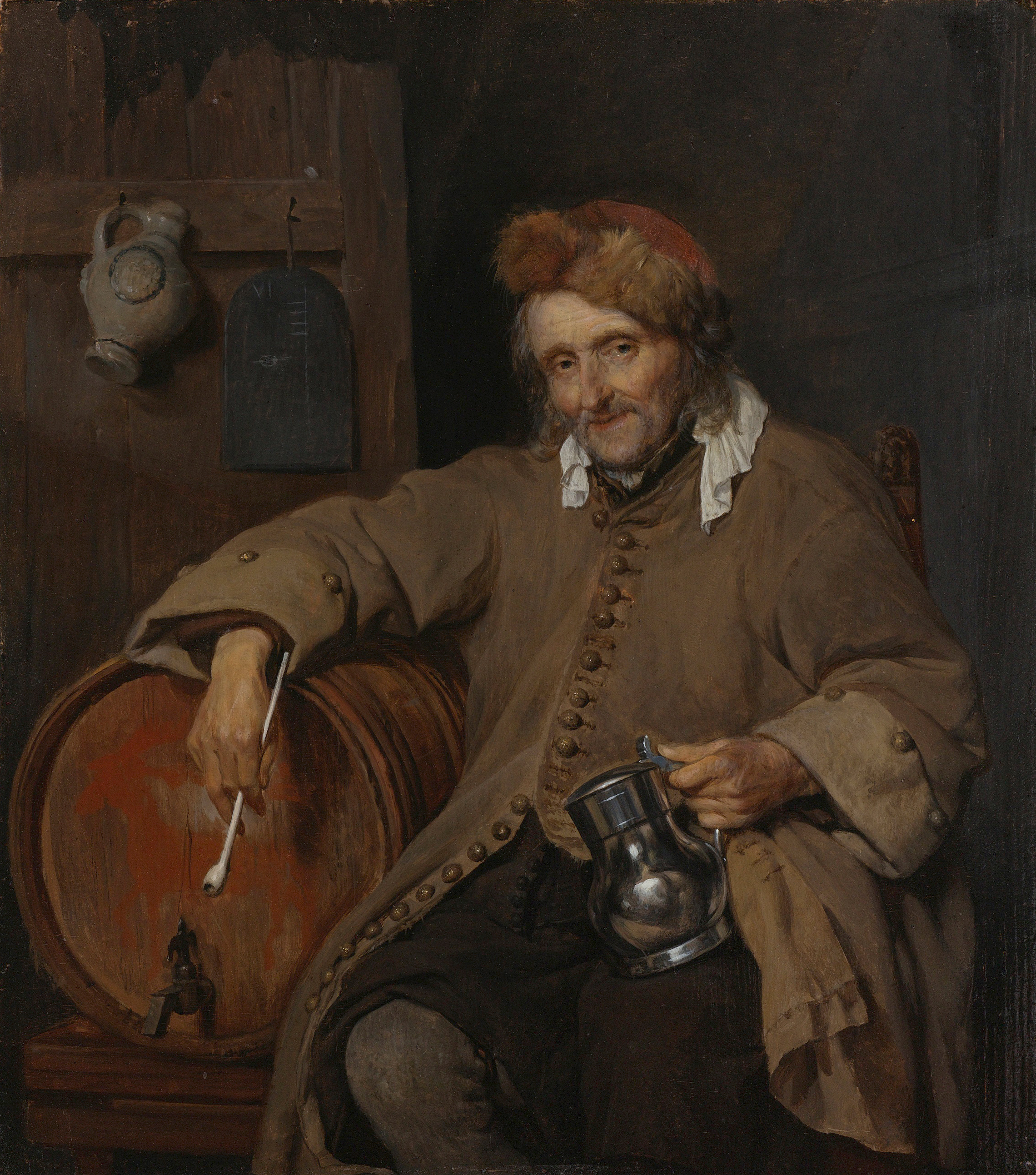
The Old Drinker circa 1650-1667

== Sources ==
- Robinson, F.W. (1974) Gabriel Metsu (1629–1667) a Study of His Place in Dutch Genre Painting of the Golden Age.
- Stone-Ferrier, L. (1989) Gabriel Metsu's Vegetable Market at Amsterdam: seventeenth century Dutch market paintings and horticulture. In: Art Bulletin Jrg. 71 (1989), nr. 3 (September)
- Waiboer, Adriaan, editor (2010) Gabriel Metsu. Yale University Press ISBN 978-0300167245 Exhibition catalog to 2010 exhibit at the National Gallery of Ireland and National Gallery of Art
