= The Sick Child (Metsu) =

Painting by Gabriël Metsu

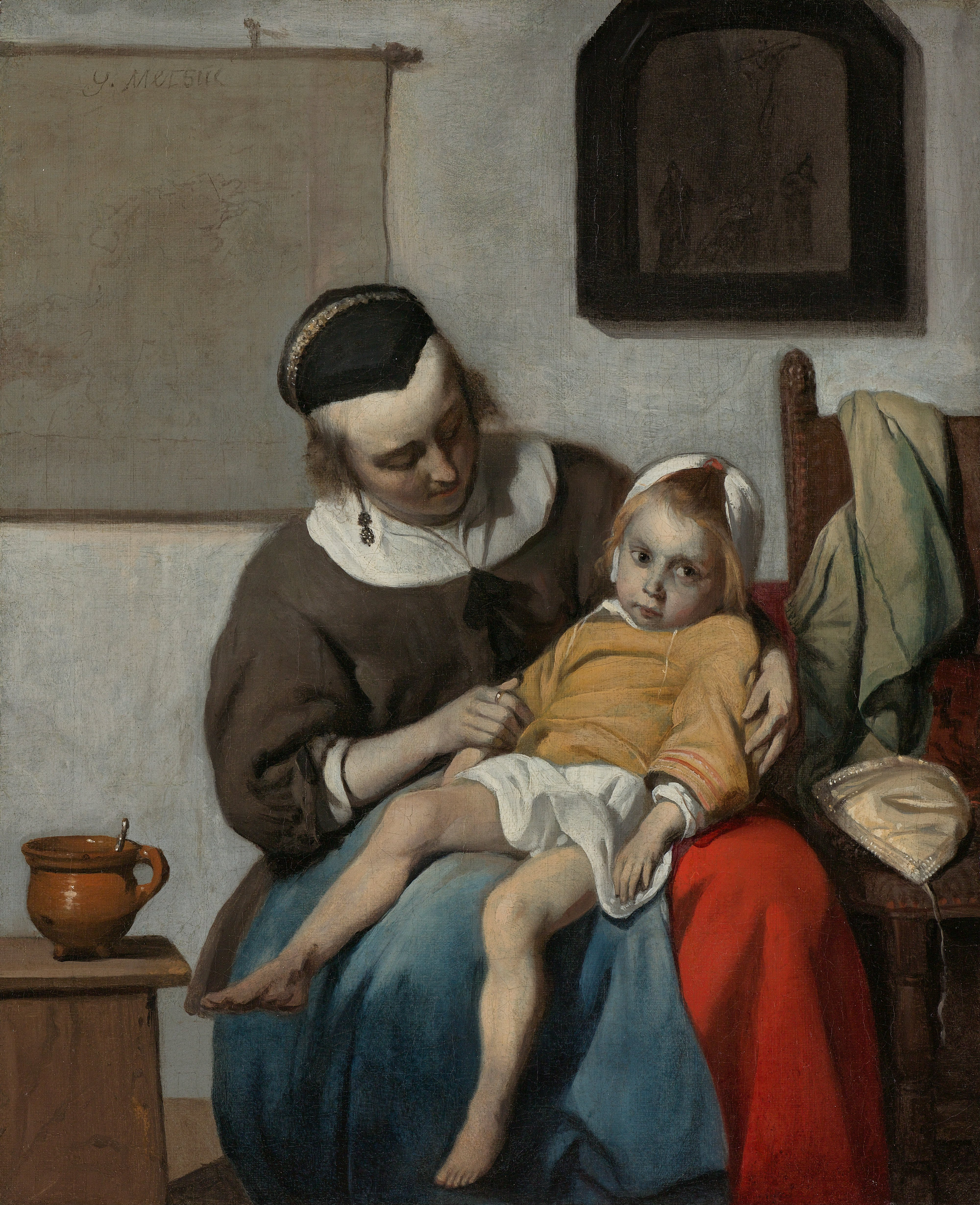
Gabriël Metsu, The Sick Child, c. 1660, Rijksmuseum, Amsterdam

The Sick Child (Dutch: Het zieke kind) or The Sick Girl is an oil on canvas genre painting by the Dutch artist Gabriël Metsu, created c. 1660. It has been held by the Rijksmuseum, in Amsterdam, since it was bought in 1928, with assistance from the Vereniging Rembrandt at a sale of works from the collection of Oscar Huldschinsky in Berlin.

Metsu painted in a variety of styles and genres through his artistic career. He painted The Sick Child towards the end of his life, when his style resembled Pieter de Hooch or Johannes Vermeer, with bright light, weak shadows, and fresh even colours, but with thicker paint and coarser brushstrokes so a less refined style than Vermeer. The painting was probably made after an outbreak of the bubonic plague in Amsterdam from 1663 to 1666: this last epidemic in Amsterdam killed a tenth of the population.

The painting measures 32.2 cm × 27.2 cm (12.7 in × 10.7 in). The composition resembles a Pietà: a mother is cradling her listless child, probably a girl, on her lap, recalling religious works depicting the Virgin Mary cradling the dead body of Jesus. The positions of the mother and the child create diagonals crossing near the mother's heart. The child gazes out vacantly past the viewer and into the distance, with her mother leaning over her attentively. The mother's bright red skirt and blue apron, and the child's yellow and white clothes, contrast with the otherwise muted tones of the room. A pot with a spoon lies unheeded on a table to the left, with the child too lethargic to eat. To the right, some clothes lie on a chair. Hanging on the wall is a map of Europe, which bears the artist's signature "G. Metsue", and a drawing of Christ on the cross, echoing the suffering in the room.

It is possible that Metsu's wife Isabella was the model for the mother in the painting: the woman wears the cap of a married woman and a wedding ring, and the earrings are seen in earlier portraits of Isabella (c.1658). The child may be theirs, although none is recorded, or possibly the child of Metsu's patron Jan Jacobszoon Hinlopen, whose family Metsu had painted in 1661 and 1663 (see Metsu's Portrait of the Family Hinlopen): Hinlopen's daughter Geertruit died of measles aged 19 months in August 1663.

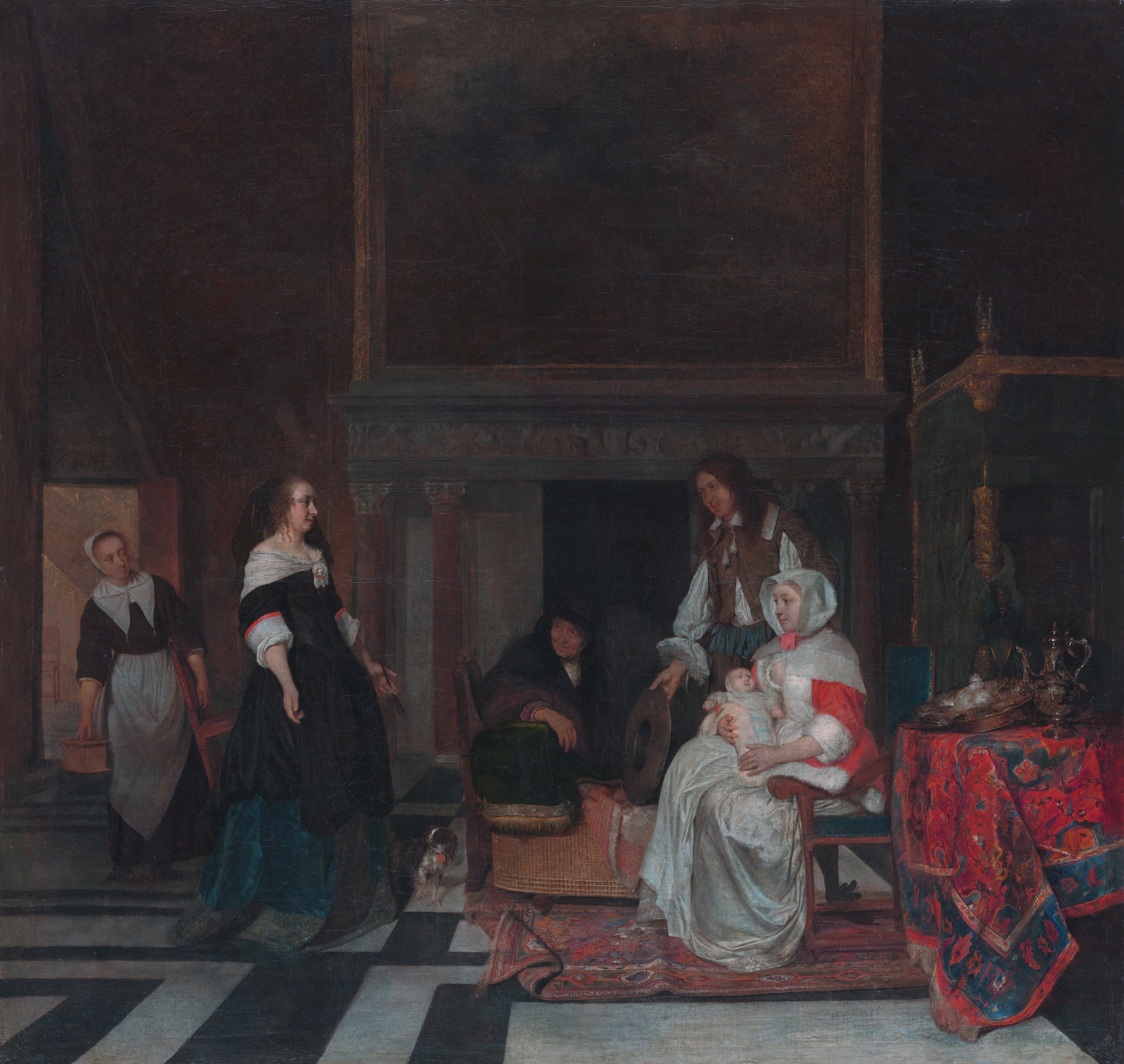
Gabriël Metsu, The Visit to the Nursery, 1661, Metropolitan Museum of Art, New York

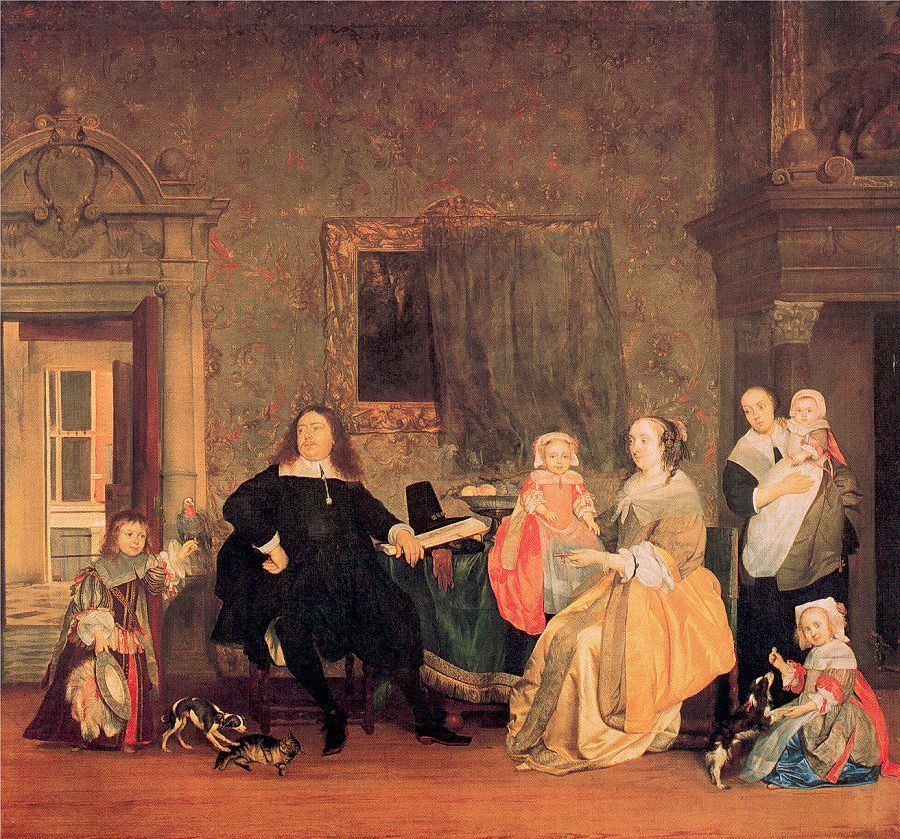
Gabriël Metsu, Portrait of the Family Hinlopen 1663, Gemäldegalerie, Berlin

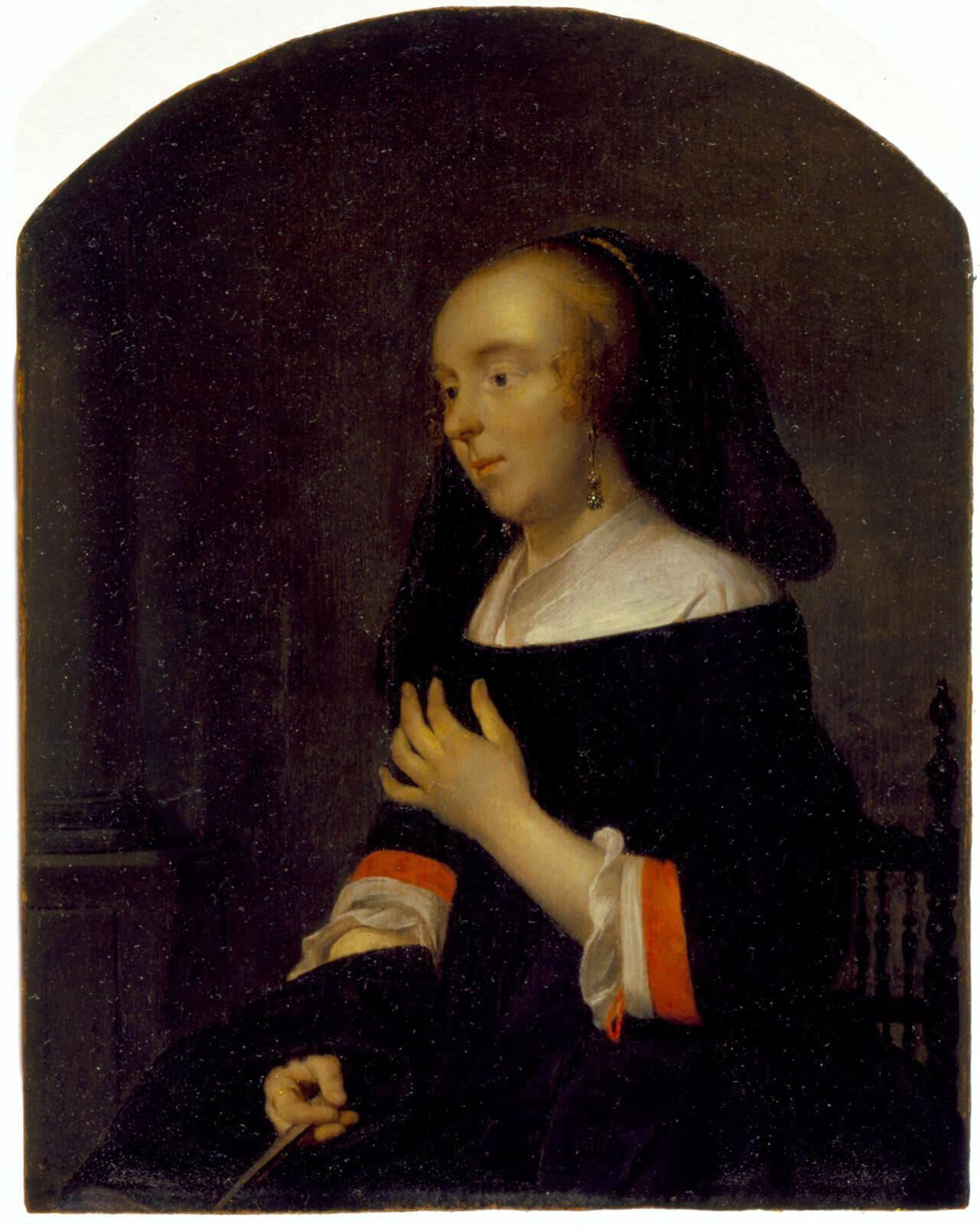
Gabriël Metsu, Portrait of his wife Isabella de Wolff, 1658, Speed Art Museum, Louisville, Kentucky

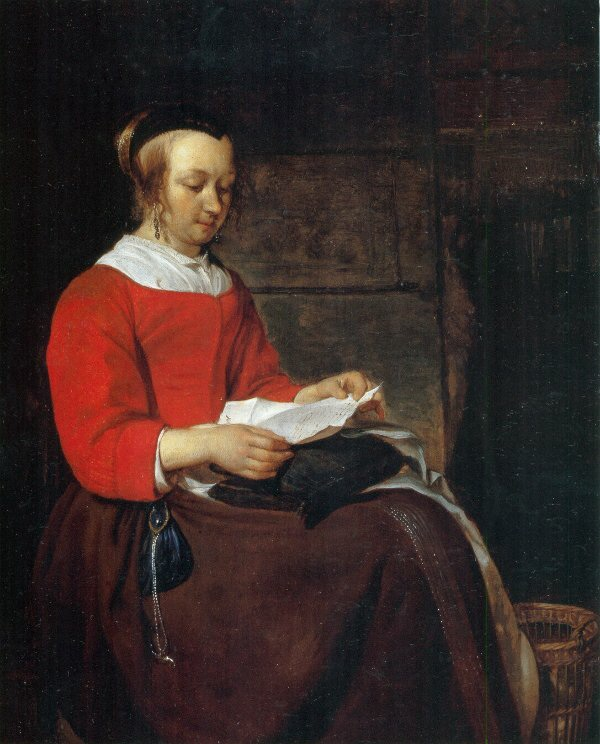
Gabriël Metsu, Young Woman Seated in an Interior, Reading a Letter, c. 1658, Leiden Collection, New York
