= Willem de Rooij =

Dutch artist and educator (born 1969)

Willem de Rooij (born 1969 in Beverwijk, Netherlands) is a Berlin-based artist and educator who works in a variety of media. Since the early 1990s, he has created temporary installations to analyze the politics of representation. Drawing on his experience in time-based media, he uses montage to combine appropriated objects. De Rooij collaborates with leading academics, initiating research in global art history and visual anthropology. His work is marked by closely edited publications and a select corpus of precisely crafted objects.

== Biography ==
=== 1989–2006: Studies and De Rijke / de Rooij ===
Willem de Rooij studied art history at the University of Amsterdam (1989–1990), and fine art at the Gerrit Rietveld Academie (1990–95) and at the Rijksakademie (1997–98), both in Amsterdam.

His early works were concerned with institutional politics. Route along 18 corners (1993) mapped the corners of exhibition rooms at Stedelijk Museum, while Rijksmuseum/Tropenmuseum (1993) compared the structures of Amsterdam's museums for historical Dutch arts, and global material culture.

From 1994 to 2006, De Rooij worked in collaboration with Jeroen de Rijke (born 1970 in Brouwershaven, Netherlands, died in 2006 in Takoradi, Ghana) as De Rijke / De Rooij. They worked primarily on concentrated short films in 16mm and 35mm. Forever and Ever (1995), a deconstructed narrative in four parts, was filmed during an academic residency at the Film and Television Institute of India. Of Three Men (1998), which depicts shifting light in Amsterdam's Fatih Mosque (a former Catholic church), responded to the rise of islamophobia and right-wing populism. Bantar Gebang (2000) records dawn breaking over one of the world’s biggest landfills outside Jakarta, Indonesia. When De Rijke / De Rooij represented the Netherlands at the 2005 Venice Biennale, their 16mm film Mandarin Ducks had well-known Dutch actors act out bourgeois tensions through visual cliches.

In 2002, De Rijke / De Rooij created the first in a series of floral sculptures they titled Bouquets.

Early monographic exhibitions include Städtisches Museum Abteiberg, Mönchengladbach (1999), the ICA, London (2002), Kunsthalle Zurich (2003) and a dual presentation together with Christoper Williams at Secession, Vienna (2005). Major retrospectives were mounted at K21 in Düsseldorf in 2007, and at the Museo d’Arte Moderna di Bologna (MAMbo) in 2008.

=== 2006–2025: Key works ===
From 2004, De Rooij began to include existing objects and works of other artists in his own artworks. When Mandarin Ducks was shown at Amsterdam’s Stedelijk Museum in 2005, he installed the film within the context of objects and artworks from the museum's collection. In 2007, installations at Galerie Chantal Crousel in Paris and Galerie Daniel Buchholz in Cologne included works of artists Isa Genzken, Keren Cytter and Sino-Dutch designer Fong Leng, named The Floating Feather, and Birds in a Park.

Questioning curatorial and museological conventions, Intolerance (2010) confronted eighteen works by Dutch bird-painter Melchior d'Hondecoeter (1636-1695) with a selection of 18th-century Hawaiian featherwork at the Neue Nationalgalerie in Berlin. The accompanying three-fold publication includes the first substantial monograph on the work of d’Hondecoeter to date, and a catalogue raisonné of all capes, helmets and god-images that are part of the category known as Hawaiian featherwork written by Adrienne Kaeppler.

Character is Fate (2015) was both a publication and a year-long installation at FKAWDW in Rotterdam. It centered on a 1911 horoscope that Piet Mondrian had commissioned for himself upon leaving his native Netherlands, which he still carried years later when fleeing Nazi oppression. Due to conservation restrictions, the fragile document was exposed to daylight for only a few minutes each day.

Proposal for the Memorialization of 'Asoziale' and 'Berufsverbrecher' (2018) aims to give the two groups that are underrepresented in German memorial culture a place in the memorial site at the former NS concentration camp in Dachau.

Seeking to make ethnographer Pierre Verger’s (1902–1996) photographs of 1948 Suriname accessible to a wider audience, De Rooij produced a publication featuring essays by, among others, Karin Amatmoekrim, Richard Price, and Gloria Wekker. The accompanying installation, Pierre Verger in Suriname (2020), projects the photographs sequentially onto a free-standing screen that briefly turns into a mirror with each transition. As a result, viewers alternately see Suriname through Verger’s lens and themselves reflected in the exhibition space.

In 2025, after nearly twenty years of research, De Rooij’s installation Valkenburg opened at Centraal Museum Utrecht. The exhibition contextualises thirty works by the 18th-century painter Dirk Valkenburg (1675–1721), Jan Weenix and Melchior d’Hondecoeter, ranging from hunting still lifes and portraits of Dutch elites to idealised depictions of Indigenous and enslaved people on Surinamese sugar plantations. By juxtaposing these diverse genres, De Rooij dissects how 18th-century Dutch elites shaped visual culture to sustain and legitimise colonial ideology. The accompanying publication, edited by De Rooij and historian Karwan Fatah-Black, presents the first catalogue raisonné of Valkenburg’s oeuvre and critical essays by leading international scholars in art history, queer studies, and postcolonial studies.

=== Textiles ===
Much of De Rooij’s critical engagement with transcultural histories is articulated through textiles which he approaches as both material and conceptual carriers of meaning. His 35mm film The Point of Departure (2002) scans a nineteenth-century Shirwan rug from Azerbaijan, and since 2009 he has sustained a long-term collaboration with the Handweberei Henni Jaensch-Zeymer, producing rare abstract textile objects.

In 2015, he installed his collection of 1980s sportswear by Fong Leng – whose pan-ethnic decorative schemes drew on sources from Ghanaian Adinkra prints to Navajo rugs – at Le Consortium in Dijon.

Between 2012 and 2015, De Rooij, in collaboration with curator Koyo Kouoh, developed two abstract wax prints, Blue to Black and Black to Blue. Produced with industrial printers in Tema, Ghana, and batik craftspeople in Yogyakarta, Indonesia, the works reframe colonial histories through the lens of textile.

== Reception ==
Describing the work of De Rijke / De Rooij in an introduction to a portfolio of their work published in Artforum in 2008, art historian Pamela M. Lee states that the artists trace "the recursive economy of the image: its affective power, its capacity to seduce and organize perception, and its mediation of time and subjectivity."

Speaking to Dieter Roelstraete in an interview published in the journal Afterall in 2010, De Rooij stated: "The very notion of 'representing', of 'imaging', is what my work is most deeply concerned with."

Assessing the nature of De Rooij's oeuvre in a 2016 Artforum article, art historian Daniel Birnbaum wrote that his works "operate as (...) instances of abstraction that cut right through the textures of meaning that we tend to read into works of art" and that they "might exist as physical crystallizations, but their logic owes much to the tactics of film: framing, cutting, editing, and, above all, focus. The very concept of focus presupposes a dialectic between discreteness and contextual embeddedness: To focus is to draw attention to this by ignoring that. In the act of bringing an image into focus, the filmmaker prompts scrutiny of an object while also articulating the fact that the rest of the world is still out there, beyond the edge of the frame. This dialectic is key to De Rooij’s work, where the same meticulous care is given to display elements and framing devices as to the art itself."

== Academia ==
De Rooij has taught and lectured extensively since 1998. He was a mentor at De Ateliers in Amsterdam from 2002–2014, and a returning guest lecturer at Art Center in Los Angeles since 2001. De Rooij has been a Professor of Fine Arts at the Städelschule in Frankfurt am Main since 2006 where he established a long-term exchange program with the Kwame Nkrumah University of Science and Technology in Kumasi, Ghana, in 2014. He has been an advisor at the Rijksakademie, Amsterdam, since 2015.

In the context of his installation Residual (2012–2022) for which he brought Jacob van Ruisdael’s View of Bentheim Castle from the Northwest (c. 1655) into the very castle it depicts, De Rooij initiated the Ruisdael Stipendium (2013–2020), which annually supported emerging artists with funding, a publication, and an exhibition.

In 2016, De Rooij co-founded BPA// Berlin program for artists, and became a member of the Royal Netherlands Academy of Arts and Sciences, KNAW.

== Recognition ==
In 2000, De Rooij won the Bâloise Art Prize, and he was nominated for the Hugo Boss Award in 2004 and the Vincent Award in 2014. De Rooij was a Robert Fulton Fellow at Harvard University in 2004, a DAAD fellow in Berlin in 2006 and a resident at the Goethe Institut in Salvador da Bahia in 2018.

Also in 2016, De Rooij was part of the selection committee that nominated Gabi Ngcobo as artistic director of Berlin Biennale in 2018.

== Exhibitions ==
Institutional solo exhibitions include Centraal Museum Utrecht (2025), Akademie der Künste, Vienna (2023), Portikus, Frankfurt (2021), Staatliche Kunstsammlungen, Dresden (2019); Kunstwerke, Berlin (2017); IMA Brisbane (2017); MMK Museum of Modern Art, Frankfurt/Main (2016); The Impassioned No at Le Consortium, Dijon (2015); The Jewish Museum, New York (2014); Piktogram, Warsaw (2012); Neue Nationalgalerie, Berlin (2010); MAMBo Bologna (2008); K21, Düsseldorf (2007); Secession, Vienna (2005) and Kunsthalle Zürich (2003).

Group exhibitions include steirischer herbst, Graz (2022), sonsbeek 2021, Arnhem, the John Hansard Gallery, Nottingham (2020); BDL Museum, Mumbai (2019); the Hammer Museum, Los Angeles (2018); Jakarta Biennale (2017); Limerick Biennial (2016); Aishti Foundation, Beirut (2015); 10th Shanghai Biennale (2014); Raw Material Company, Dakar (2013); BOZAR Centre for Fine Arts, Brussels (2011); Media City Seoul (2010); 2nd Athens Biennale (2009) and the Japanese American National Museum, Los Angeles (2008).

== Collections ==
De Rooij’s works can be found in the collections of Stedelijk Museum, Amsterdam; The Black Archives, Amsterdam; MUMOK, Vienna; Hamburger Bahnhof, Berlin; Centre Pompidou, Paris; MOCA, Los Angeles; Museum Sztuki, Łódź, and MOMA, New York.
