= Bob Haak =

Bob Haak may refer to:

- Bob Haak (American football) (1916–1992), American football player
- Bob Haak (art expert) (1926–2005), Dutch art historian
