= Lucia Wijbrants =

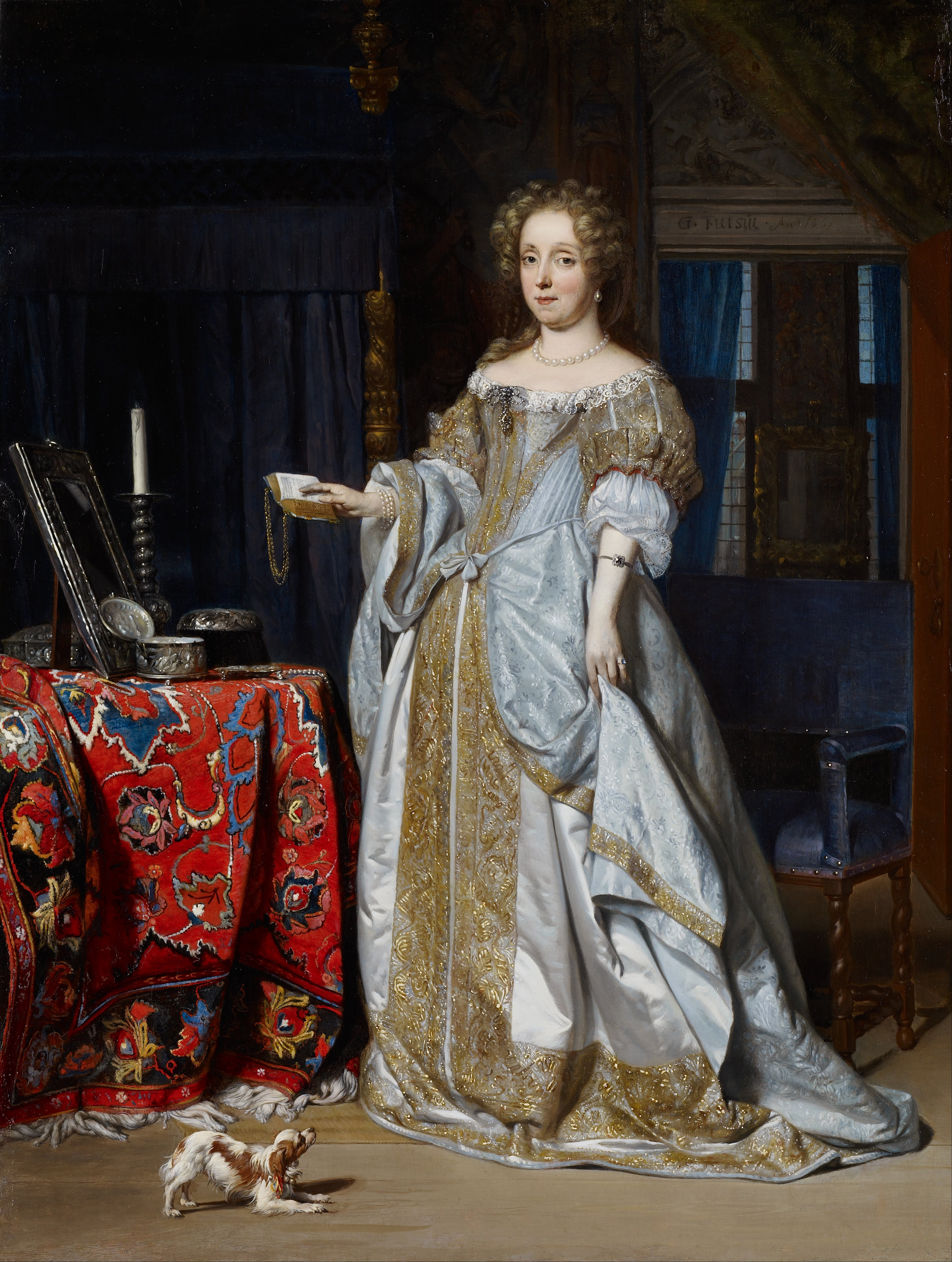
A portrait of Lucia Wijbrants painted by Gabriël Metsu in 1667

Lucia Wijbrants or Wybrants (October 21, 1638 in Amsterdam – May 23, 1719 in Utrecht) was the daughter of Johannes Wijbrants, a silk merchant, whose ancestors had moved from Stavoren to Antwerp. After 1585 when Antwerp was occupied by the Spanish army, the family moved to Amsterdam and lived in a house in the Warmoesstraat, then a fashionable shopping street. They had eight more children: only Hendrick (1623–1669), Helena (1628–1721), and Johannes (1638 - ?) survived.

== Jan J. Hinlopen ==
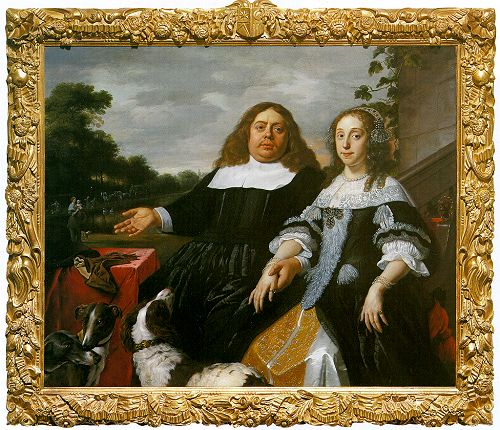
Jan J. Hinlopen in 1665, with his second wife Lucia Wijbrants. Painting by Bartholomeus van der Helst, now in a private collection.

Lucia grew up at Keizersgracht 213. On December 9, 1664 she gave notice to her marriage with Jan J. Hinlopen; she was accompanied by her mother, Machteld Pater. On January 6, 1665 the couple married in the Nieuwe Kerk. Jan Vos wrote a poem for the happy occasion. On November 13, 1665, Lucia gave birth to a still-born child, buried the next day. In 1666 Hinlopen commissioned a painting from Bartholomeus van der Helst of the 27-year-old Lucia, himself, and three hunting dogs, but showing his deceased first wife and children in the background. In September 1666 Jan J. Hinlopen, rather stocky built, died at the age of forty. Lucia lived with her two stepchildren on Kloveniersburgwal, next to her brother-in-law Jacob J. Hinlopen.

Having a portrait of yourself became very popular in the Netherlands after 1660, and a portrait functioned as a sort of a personal web page. Lucia Wijbrants had herself painted in 1666 by Lodewijk van der Helst (1642–1684). This painting by the son of Bartholomeus van der Helst is now in the Museum of Fine Arts (Budapest). According to her will on June 27, 1716, she had her portrait painted by Gabriel Metsu. Metsu painted only a few portraits in his lifetime; the resemblance with the one from 1667, now in Minneapolis, and two other portraits of Lucia is striking. On the painting, one can see a chandelier. It could be one of the two silver chandeliers given by Joan Huydecoper II and his wife to the parents of Sara Hinlopen on September 10, 1660, two months after her birth.

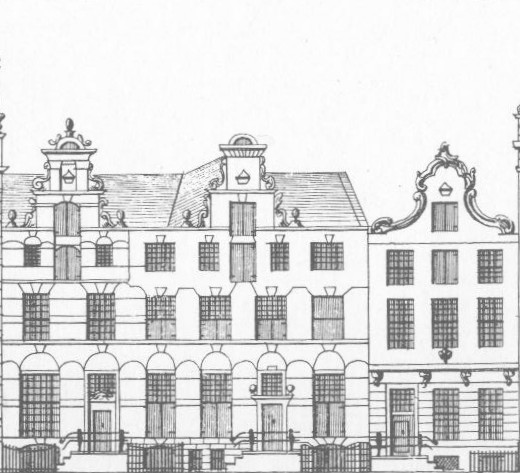
Keizersgracht 213 in the middle, a house known as Belief, not existing anymore. The neighboring houses were called Hope and Love. Engraving around 1770 by Caspar Philips

Within a few years it became clear she did not get along with Johanna Maria and Sara Hinlopen, two rich, self-aware, or maybe jaded orphans. Lucia moved in with her mother at Herengracht and remarried Johan van Nellesteyn (1617–1677) on February 29, 1672 in Sloten. In their marriage contract is stated she gave him her portrait by Jurriaen Ovens, a Holstein painter, who from time to time lived in Amsterdam. If he would die before her, she would inherit 8.000 guilders and the inventory, but not the library, nor the portraits. In the same year, she claimed from the estate of her late husband. In 1718 the ladies Hinlopen received a diamond ring, a necklace with 39 pearls, two silver chandeliers, a silver box, a silver comb and an oval silver plate(?) from their former stepmother.

When she died, it seems, everybody important attended her funeral in Westerkerk. She was related to Jan Commelin and Caspar Commelin, two famous Dutch botanists. Her sister Helena and Machteld Wijbrants, her niece, inherited all her belongings. Machteld on her turn left everything to Hester Hinlopen. In the 19th century the portrait of Lucia belonged to Nathan Mayer Rothschild. Since 1992 the painting can be seen in the Minneapolis Institute of Art.

== Johan van Nellesteyn ==
Van Nellesteyn was a burgomaster in the city of Utrecht in the years 1654–1656, 1658–1660, 1664, 1665. After his second wife, Hillegonda Pater, had died in 1670 married Lucia Wijbrants. In 1672, a year which is called by the Dutch the disaster year, Johan van Nellesteyn and his wife were fleeing from Utrecht, when the city was occupied by the French army under Louis XIV. Nellesteyn and his brother-in-law, Jacob Martens, moved their belongings to Amsterdam by boat. On their way back a few months later, Nellesteyn was attacked by the orangist mob, who regarded him as a traitor. Nellesteyn was one of the few members of the vroedschap reappointed by William III of Orange after 1672.
