= Jan Jacobszoon Hinlopen =

Dutch cloth merchant

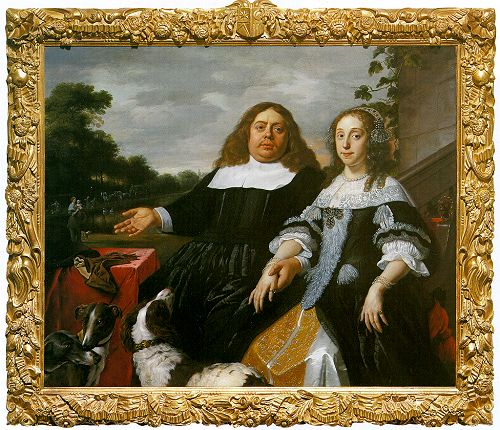
- Jan J. Hinlopen in 1666, with his new wife Lucia Wijbrants. Painting by Bartholomeus van der Helst, now in a private collection
- Born: 10 May 1626; Amsterdam
- Died: 4 September 1666 (aged 40); Amsterdam
- Resting place: Nieuwe Kerk
- Occupations: Dealing in real estate, cloth, juridical advisor in the city hall
- Employer: Self-employed
- Known for: Art collecting, poems by Jan Vos
- Spouse(s): 1) Leonore Huydecoper of Maarseveen (1657-63); 2) Lucia Wijbrants (1664-66)
- Children: Jacob, Johanna Maria, Sara and Geertrui
- Parent(s): Jacob J. Hinlopen & Sara de Wael
- Relatives: (Cata)lijntje (1619), Jacob (1621), Sara (1623), Frans (1628)

Jan Jacobszoon Hinlopen (10 May 1626 – 4 September 1666) was a rich Dutch cloth merchant, an officer in the civic guard, a real estate developer in the Jordaan, alderman in the city council and a keen art collector. He would have been elected as a burgomaster, if he had not died at the age of forty, an age considered acceptable to be eligible. He was a prominent patron of the arts in his time, and there is some speculation on being an influential protector of Rembrandt and it is likely that he had good connections with Gabriel Metsu. Hinlopen, like his father-in-law, Joan Huydecoper I, is known in art history because of the poems by Jan Vos reciting the paintings in his house and members of the family. These paintings are spread all over the world, the poems nearly forgotten.

== Life ==
Jan J. Hinlopen was born as the son of the merchant Jacob J. Hinlopen (1582–1629), who traded spices and ship chandlery. The family origins were in Brabant, then the Southern Netherlands. After Antwerp had been occupied by the Spanish, Protestants, who did not want to convert to Catholicism, were ordered to sell their homes and immoveable possessions and depart. Within four years many Flemish cities lost half of their population emigrating to the north. It is possible the family moved in an earlier stage to the North and in 1572 escaped from Naarden, where all the inhabitants were killed in a massacre. Anyhow, the new immigrants lived in a house on the Nieuwendijk, named "Hinlopen" and very close to the harbour. The name of house has to do with Hindelopen, the small town in the North, producing many skippers and sailors.

After coming of age, Jan J. Hinlopen lived with his brother Jacob J. Hinlopen on the Leliegracht at the corner of the Keizersgracht, not far from their parents, who moved to Herengracht. The brothers made money from a cloth business in Warmoesstraat and through building cheap housing in the Jordaan. When their mother died in 1652, the daughter of a Haarlem brewer and burgomaster and herself the owner of a brewery, the Hinlopen brothers inherited a mansion designed by Philips Vingboons, nicely situated in the woods between Baarn, Soest and Hilversum.

=== Career ===
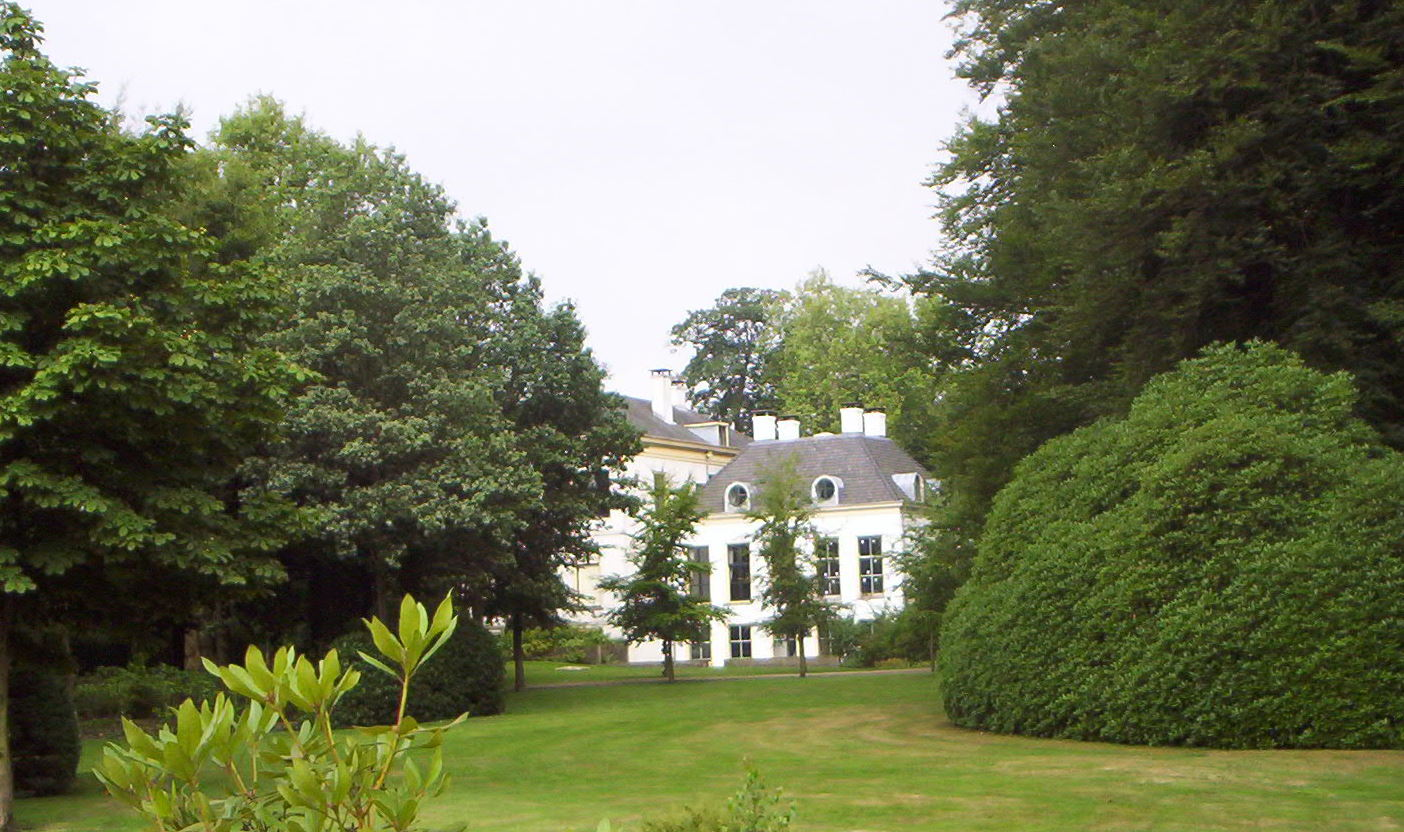
Pijnenburg

Wishing to make a career in city politics, Jan enrolled in the civic guard as an ensign in 1651-1653 and in 1655. He served under captain Gerrit Reynst, also an art collector. When the new town hall was opened on 29 July, Jan was participating in a parade on Dam Square; he wrote that three salvos were discharged, but not that his brother Jacob was sent out of the city for a day. In 1656 he was appointed as a city official in the Nieuwe Kerk. He resigned within a few months, when he was appointed as an administrator in the townhall. In the schutterij Jan was promoted lieutenant. On 1 February 1661 Jan was elected as schepen. He may have witnessed the unveiling of Rembrandts' painting The Conspiracy of Claudius Civilis in the town hall, as well as its removal a couple of months later.

On 3 April 1657 Jan J. Hinlopen married Leonore Huydecoper of Maarseveen (1631–1663), the daughter of a rich mayor, Johan Huydecoper van Maarsseveen and an art lover. There is a sketch by her father for the arrangement of the chairs for the main room in his house on Singel. Jan Vos the local theatre director, gave five performances including accompanying poems for the occasion. Every show consisted of at least thirty to forty scenes portrayed in an allegorical manner, for example on the despairs of Amsterdam during the plague epidemic in the years 1652-1657:

He had Apollo and Themis, then Pallas and House-Pride, enjoying plays. Caution, Cleverness, Politeness and Reasonableness stand at one side of the throne; Charm, Kindness, Pity and Wakefulness at the other...

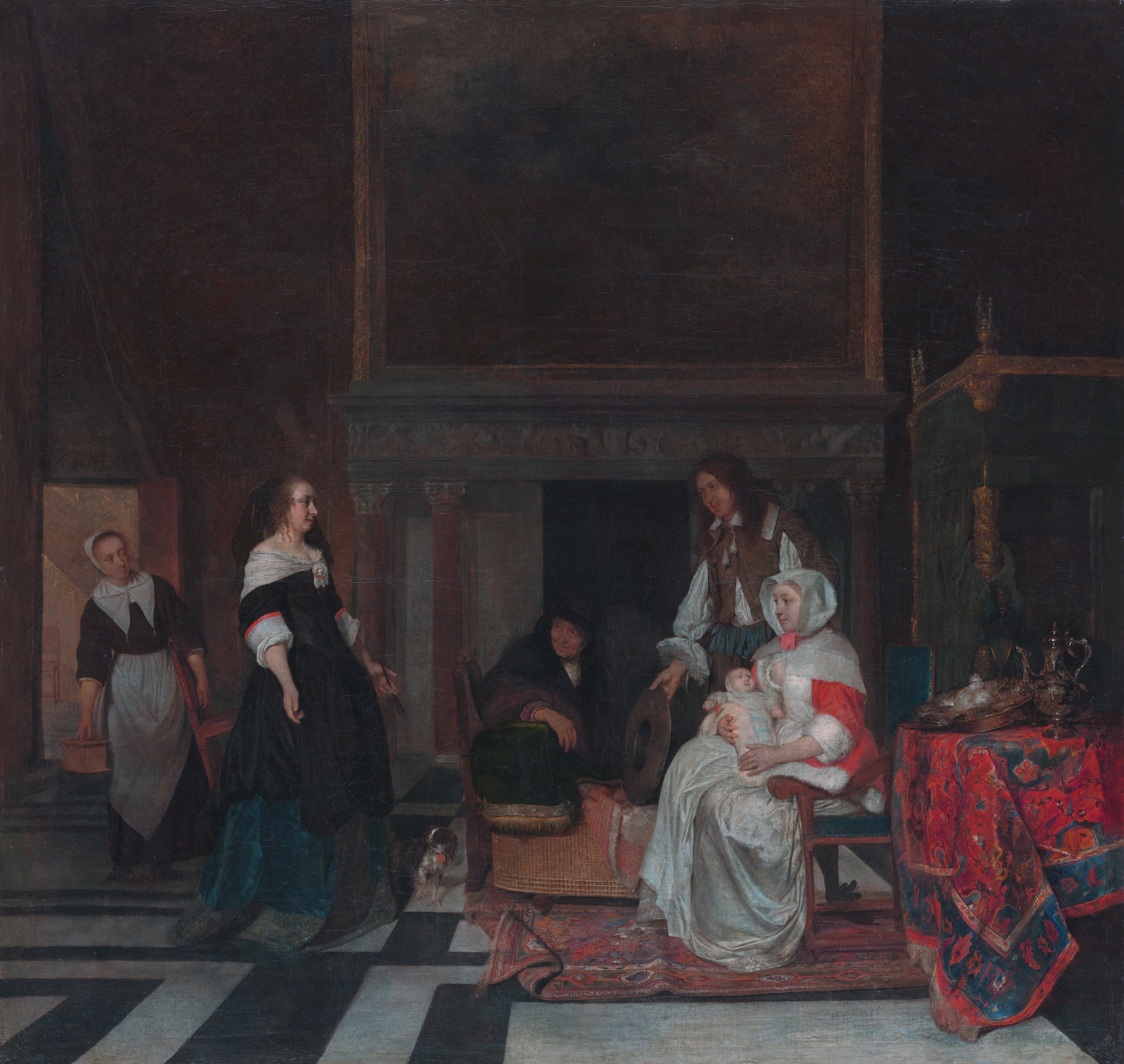
The Visit to the Nursery, by Gabriel Metsu, now in the Metropolitan Museum of Art (1661). Gift by J. Pierpont Morgan in 1917

=== Family ===
Jan and Leonore had four children:

- Jacob (20 October 1658 – Lage Vuursche, 12 July 1664),
- Johanna Maria (16 April 1659 – 15 June 1706),
- Sara (12 June 1660 – 16 June 1749) and
- Geertrui (1 January 1662 – 14 August 1663).

Jan Hinlopen made distinct notes as to time of birth and date of baptism in the Westerkerk, at what time they were born and on which day they were baptized in the Westerkerk. His diary becomes dramatic when Jan J. Hinlopen lost his youngest daughter developing measles and his wife having a miscarriage after seven months. The next day, on 29 October, around ten in the evening the baby was carried to the church by his servant Jan, accompanied by two other men, most probably the undertakers. On 1 November his wife Leonora died at 5.30 in the morning, having been ill for seven days. His only son Jacob died at Pijnenburg, when his father was not present.

On 6 January 1665 Jan remarried to Lucia Wijbrants in the Nieuwe Kerk. At some time Hinlopen moved from a house in Doelenstraat, which he rented from Pieter Carpentier, to house on Kloveniersburgwal, opposite Jan Six. He was living next to his brother, Jacob J. Hinlopen, then a superintendent of a nearby elderly peoples home. Lucia gave birth to a stillborn child on 11 November 1665. In 1666 he commissioned a painting from Bartholomeus van der Helst of Lucia, himself and the hunting dogs, but showing his deceased first wife and children in the background. Jan J. Hinlopen, rather stockily built, died at the age of forty. He was buried in the Oude Kerk on 10 September 1666, next to his first wife and their baby.

== Hinlopen's collection of paintings ==
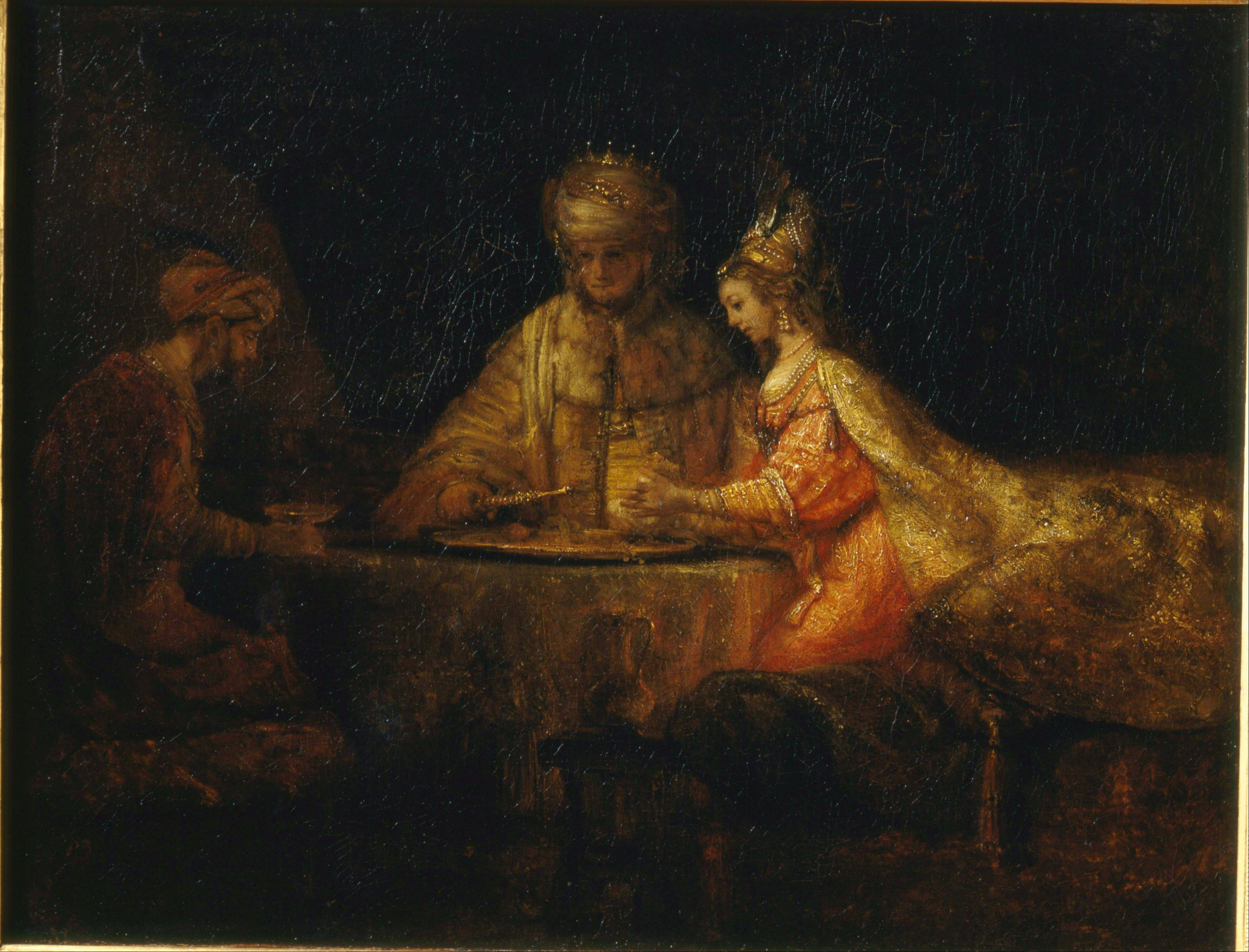
Ahasuerus and Haman at the feast of Esther, by Rembrandt (1660). Pushkin Museum, Moscow

After its completion, Rembrandt sold the painting Ahasuerus and Haman at the feast of Esther to Jan J. Hinlopen. It is based on the Old Testament story. During a banquet the wife of the Persian King Ahasuerus, the Jew Esther accuses the king's favourite Haman of plotting to destroy her people. This painting may be one of the few paintings by Rembrandt whose provenance can be traced back to the year 1662. In that year Jan Vos published a poetry book in which there were sundry poems based on the paintings of Jan J. Hinlopen.

In his collection were two paintings by Jan Lievens, The raising of Lazarus, now in Bristol, and Christ in the tomb. The painting by Bartholomeus van der Helst was inherited by his second wife Lucia Wijbrants. Furthermore, he had a painting of flowers by Willem van Aelst, and the painting Simon in the temple with Christ as a child by Gerbrand van den Eeckhout. In his salon he showed Venus in a cloud full of Cupids by Rubens, which she inherited from her father Joan Huydecoper van Maarsseveen.

=== Two paintings by Metsu ===
One of the two paintings by Gabriel Metsu belonging to Hinlopen does depict the Hinlopen family. That one is in the Berlin Gemäldegalerie. Whether or not the one in the New York Metropolitan Museum is also depicting Hinlopen and his wife is still not clear. Arnold Houbraken, in 1721, recalled the latter painting as the largest and finest work by Metsu he had ever seen.

There is still some confusion among art historians about the history of one of the paintings by Metsu, now in the Gemäldegalerie. Besides it is not clear if this painting is a genre work or a portrait. After the Geelvinck family ceased to exist in the early 19th century, the traces to the real origins were lost. The Swiss family Tschiffely sold the painting in 1832. In the end of the 19th century it was known as depicting the Familie des Kaufmanns Gelfing. In 1907 the known Dutch art-historian Hofstede de Groot mentioned the parrot in the painting of the Familie Geelvinck. Remarkably he described the painting as langweilig (= boring). In 1984 also Bob Haak describes it as depicting the Geelvinck family.

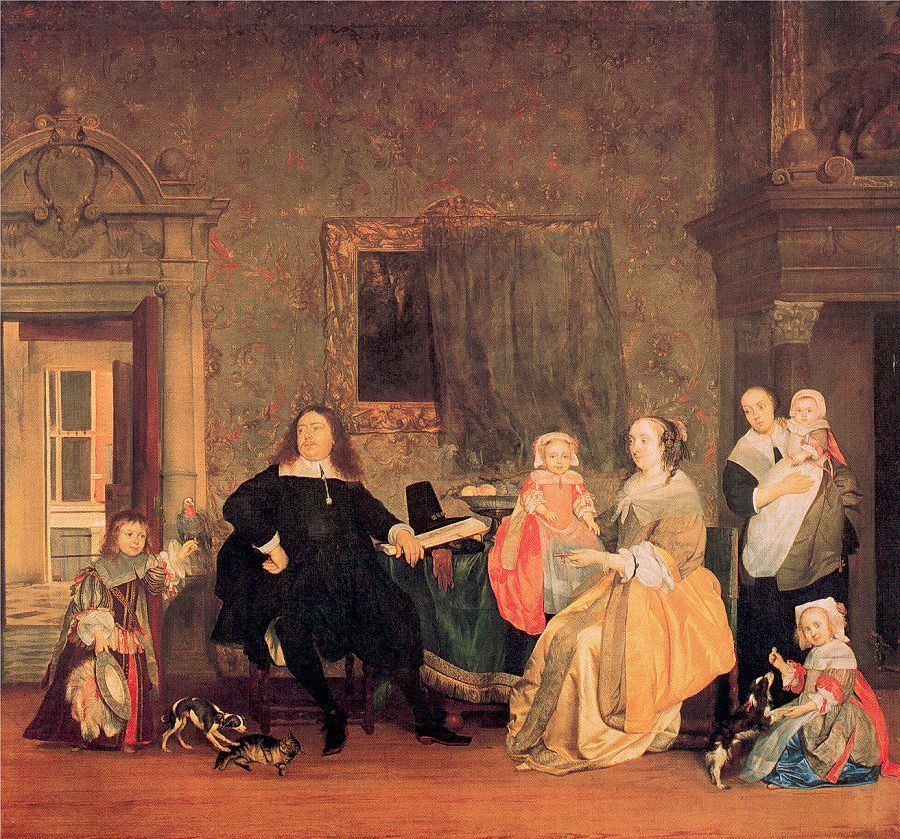
The family Hinlopen by G. Metsu (1663)

In 1976 Van Eeghen renamed the painting to De familie van burgemeester Gillis Valckenier, and dated it in 1657. This was mainly based on the bird in the painting, which van Eeghen imagined to be a falcon. Irene Groeneweg reasons that the bird, held by the boy, is a Cuban amazon parrot. Another reason to doubt the classification is that, according to the Amsterdam City Archives, burgomaster Gillis Valckenier had six children at the time of the painting's creation.

Judith van Gent discovered that there was a resemblance with Hinlopen's on the works of Bartholomeus van der Helst and the family, depicted by Metsu on the painting in Berlin. Additionally she discovered support for her view in Hinlopens will. Nevertheless, the painting is still and erroneously referred to as: The Family of burgomaster Gillis Valckenier.

The painting in the Metropolitan Museum of Art, called A Visit to the Nursery, dated 1661, may depict the family Hinlopen. According to Walter Liedtke there is some general resemblance. The scene is set in an imaginary room. The chimney resembles the one in the former Amsterdam townhall, also painted by Pieter de Hooch. A guest is greeted by the new mother and her hat-doffing husband. There is a seascape, a painting of a brawny fisherman on the wall and Persian carpets on the table and the floor. The dog in the painting could be a Bolognese.

The history of this painting is well-known, except for between the years 1666 and 1706. In 1662 Jan Vos published a poem about this painting, belonging to Jan J. Hinlopen. Most of Jan Hinlopen's collection passed to his daughters. In 1680, after the burial of his brother and guardian Jacob J. Hinlopen his paintings were divided in lots and given to his daughters but none of the paintings or painters are mentioned.

== See also ==
- Museum Geelvinck-Hinlopen, for more on Sara and the family
