= Portrait of the Family Hinlopen =

Painting by Gabriël Metsu

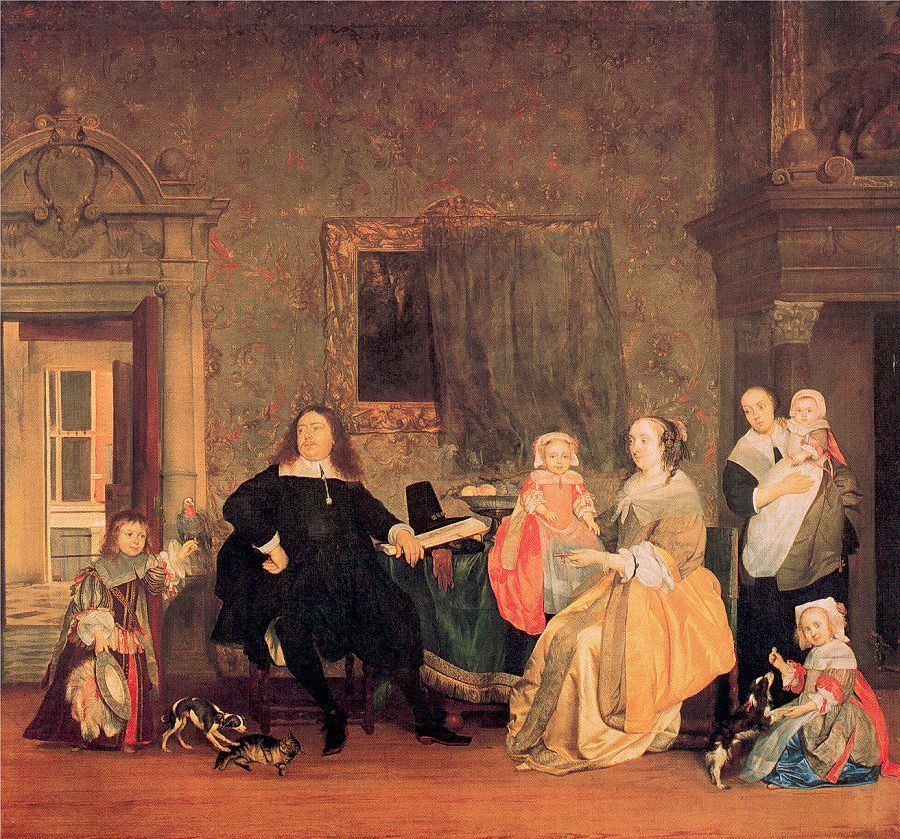
The family Hinlopen by Gabriël Metsu. This painting seems to have been ready or finished in 1663, perhaps as a memory.

The Portrait of the Family Hinlopen or Family of burgomaster Gillis Valckenier is a painting Dutch Golden Age painter Gabriël Metsu made c. 1663. It is part of the collection in the Gemäldegalerie, Berlin. There have been various ideas among art historians as to which family is actually represented, with the two main candidates being the families of Jan J. Hinlopen or Gillis Valckenier, both wealthy and powerful figures in Amsterdam at the time.

== Provenance ==
It is now increasingly accepted that the family are the Hinlopens. In his diary Jan J. Hinlopen made distinct notes about his marriage and family births, dates of baptisms in the Westerkerk Amsterdam, and funerals.

Hinlopen and Leonore Huydecoper, the sister of Joan Huydecoper, had four children by 1663:

- Jacob (October 20, 1658 – Lage Vuursche, July 12, 1664),
- Johanna Maria (April 16, 1659 – June 15, 1706),
- Sara (June 12, 1660 – June 16, 1749), and
- Geertrui (January 1, 1662 – August 14, 1663).

In the second half of 1663 two members of the family died. Jan J. Hinlopen lost his youngest daughter, Geertrui, who died of measles on August 14. On October 28 his wife had a miscarriage. The next day, around ten in the evening, his servant, accompanied by two other men, probably the undertakers, buried a small coffin in the church. On November 1, his wife Leonora died at 5.30 in the morning, after having been ill for seven days. His only son Jacob died at Pijnenburg, their country estate. He was kept isolated because of the plague, which prevailed since October 1663 and made 7,000 more victims in 1664.

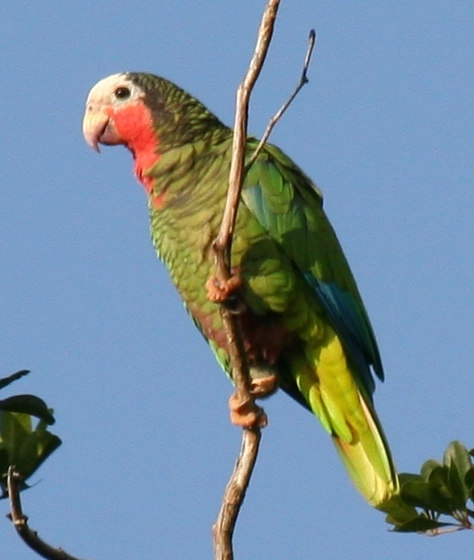
Cuban parrot in tree

After the Geelvinck family, heirs of Sara, ceased to exist in the early 19th century, the traces to the real origins were lost. The Swiss family Tschiffely sold the painting in 1832. In the end of the 19th century it was known as depicting the Familie des Kaufmanns Gelfing. In 1907 the known Dutch art-historian Hofstede de Groot mentioned the parrot in the painting of the Familie Geelvinck. Remarkably he described the painting as langweilig ("boring"). In 1984 also Bob Haak describes it as depicting the Geelvinck family.

In 1976 Van Eeghen renamed the painting to De familie van burgemeester Gillis Valckenier, and dated it in 1657. This was mainly based on the bird in the painting, which van Eeghen imagined to be a falcon. Irene Groeneweg reasons that the bird, held by the boy, is a Cuban amazon parrot. Another reason to doubt the classification is that, according to the Amsterdam City Archives, burgomaster Gillis Valckenier had only three children at the time of the painting's creation.

Judith van Gent discovered that there was a resemblance with another Hinlopen family portrait by Bartholomeus van der Helst in Berlin. Additionally she discovered support for her view in Hinlopen's will. Nevertheless, the painting is still sometimes referred to as: The Family of burgomaster Gillis Valckenier.

== Location ==
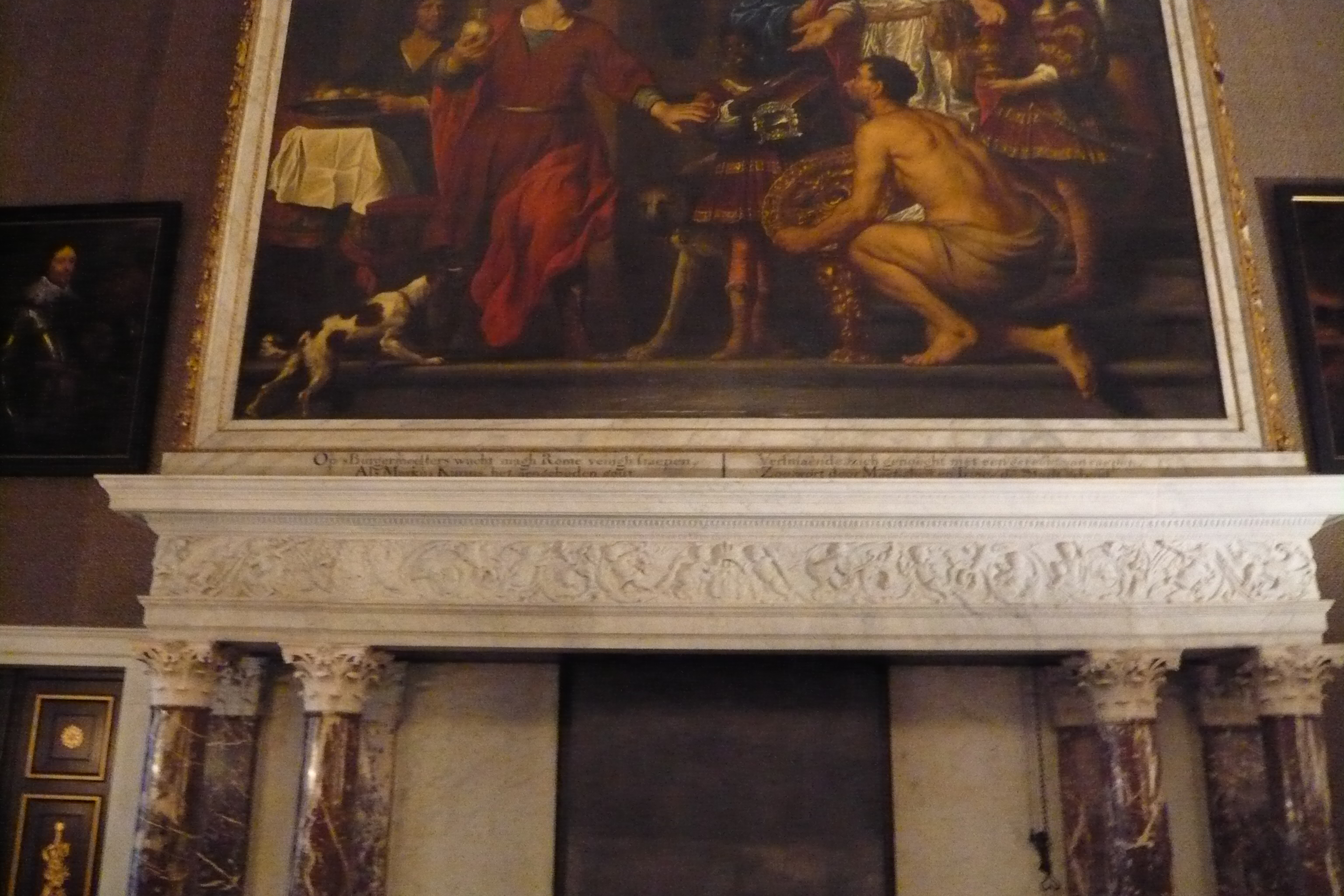
Picture of the hearth of one side of the Mayor's room in the Amsterdam City Hall, showing a painting by Govert Flinck above the mantel

The atmosphere of the painting indicates a family painted in the luxury of their own home, presumably one of the modern canal mansions of Amsterdam at the time. Unfortunately the interior mantelpiece and paintings portrayed are unrecognizable. However, it was fashionable for members of the Amsterdam regency to depict one's family in the Amsterdam City Hall, which was completed in the 1650s. Being open to the councilmen and containing high windows with much light, the mayors' room would have enabled easy sketching for artists. This painting possibly shows the mantelpiece of the hearth by Artus Quellinus the Elder there with a painting completed by Govert Flinck in 1656.

Other similar scenes are also influenced by the same mantelpiece construction:

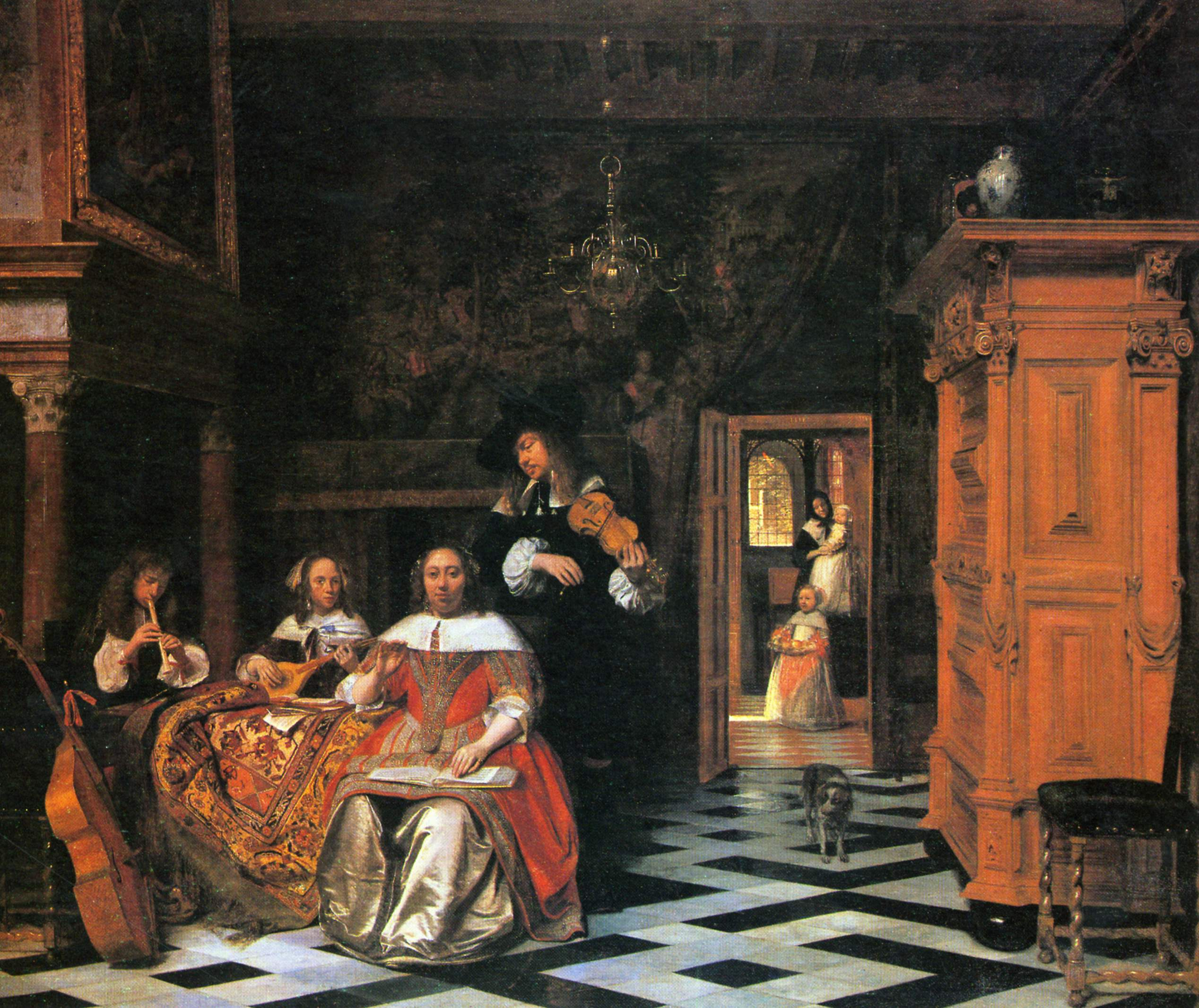
A musical family by Pieter de Hooch

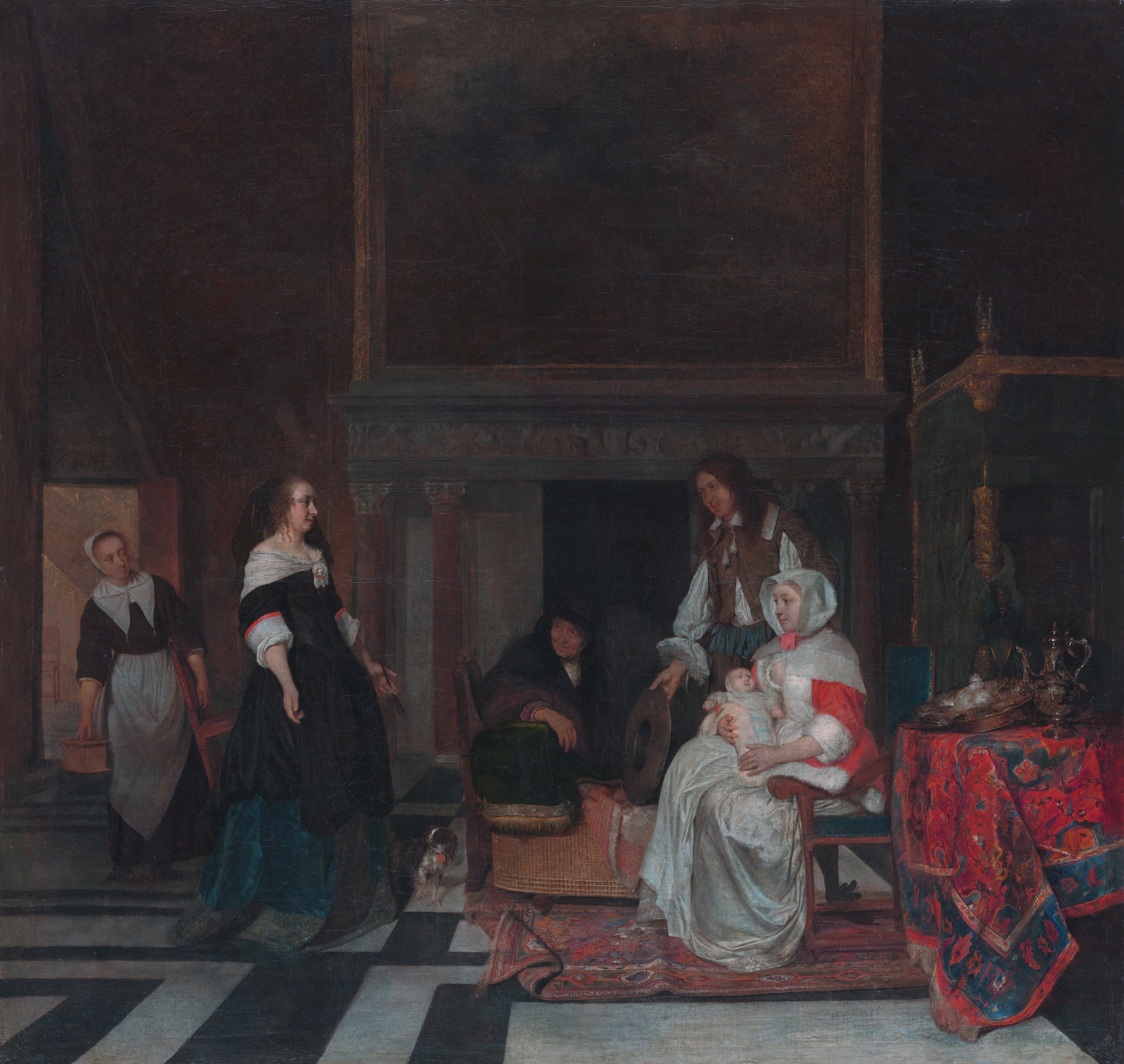
Visit to the nursery by Metsu

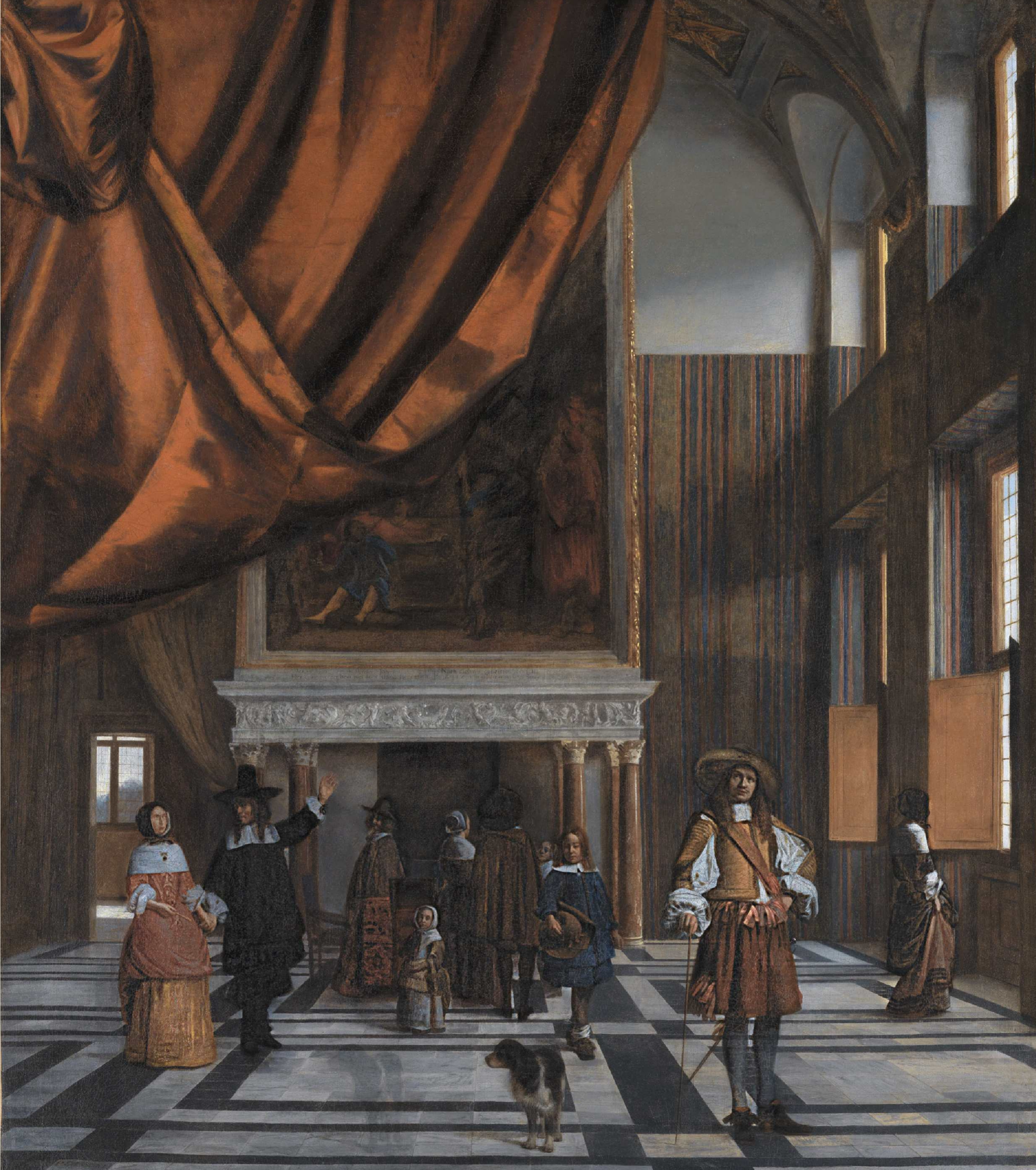
The Council Chamber in Amsterdam Town Hall
