= Mathilde Willink =

Amsterdam society figure, wife and muse of Carel Willink (1938–1977)

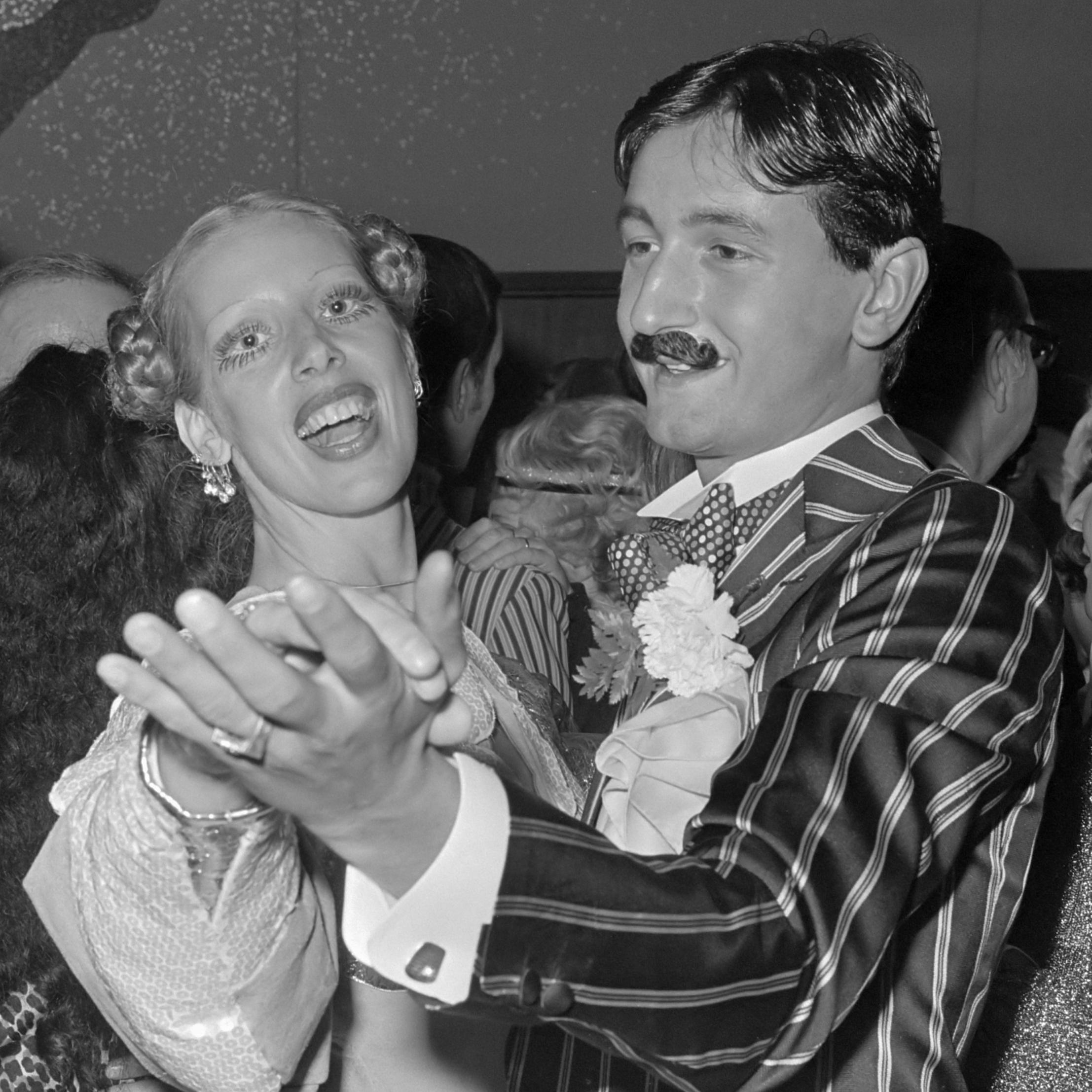
Mathilde Willink and friend (1975)

Mathilde Willink née Maria Theodora Mathilde de Doelder (7 July 1938, Terneuzen – 25 October 1977, Amsterdam) was an Amsterdam society figure and fashion icon, married to Dutch painter Carel Willink (1900–1983) from 1969 to 1977. She often wore Fong Leng's extravagant designs. The Willinks' eccentric relationship made them a staple in the Dutch gossip columns of the time. Four months after she divorced Carel, Mathilde was found dead in her bed. The details of her death remain unclear.

== Biographies ==
At least six biographies have been written:

- Joop van Loon Mathilde of de bekentenissen van een Zeeuws meisje (Baarn 1977) ISBN 9789057570018
- René Zwaap Zeeuws meisje (In De Groene Amsterdammer, 2 July 1997)
- Joop van Loon Mathilde Willink (1997) ISBN 9789057570018
- Tomas Ross Mathilde (2003) ISBN 9789023411970
- Marjolein Houweling Andermans Ogen (2010) ISBN 9789081601917
- Lisette de Zoete, Mathilde: muze, mythe, mysterie, (2016) ISBN 9789462261488
