= Jur Haak =

Dutch footballer

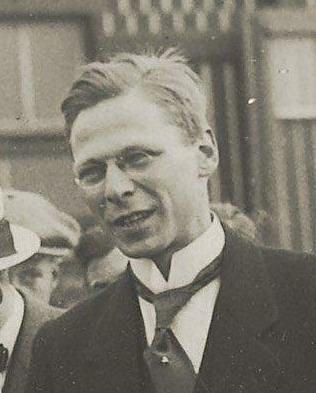
- Haak in 1918

Personal information
- Full name: Jurriaan Haak
- Date of birth: 3 November 1891
- Place of birth: Semarang, Dutch East Indies
- Date of death: 30 January 1945 (aged 53)
- Place of death: Sachsenhausen concentration camp, Nazi Germany
- Position: Midfielder

Senior career*
Years	Team	Apps	(Gls)
- HFC Haarlem

International career
1912	Netherlands	2	(2)
- * Club domestic league appearances and goals

Jurriaan Haak (3 November 1891 – 30 January 1945 (aged 53)), commonly known as Jur Haak, was a Dutch footballer, athlete, teacher, and member of the Dutch resistance. He represented the Netherlands national team in two matches, scoring in both.

During the German occupation of the Netherlands, Haak and his wife, Henriette Augusta "Jet" van Eek, participated in the resistance and later died in Sachsenhausen concentration camp in January 1945.

== Early life and sporting career ==
Haak was born in Semarang, in the Dutch East Indies. In 1904, his family moved from Java to Haarlem. Like his brothers Jan and Albert Haak, he played football for HFC Haarlem.

Haak was selected as a reserve for the Netherlands football squad at the 1908 Summer Olympics in London, where the Dutch team won the bronze medal. He did not appear in either of the team's matches.

He made his senior international debut against Germany in Leipzig on 17 November 1912. Haak scored in the 56th minute as the Netherlands won 3–2. His second and final international appearance came against Belgium on 9 March 1913. He again scored, helping the Netherlands recover from a three-goal deficit to draw the match 3–3.

Haak also competed in athletics. On 3 September 1916, he set a Dutch record in the high jump with a height of 1.79 metres, improving the previous record by ten centimetres. His record stood until July 1919.

== Teaching and family ==
After ending the principal part of his football career, Haak taught mathematics and physics in the Dutch East Indies. He returned to the Netherlands and was appointed to the Amsterdams Lyceum in 1922. In 1929, he joined the teaching staff of the newly established Montessori Lyceum Amsterdam, where he taught mathematics.

Haak married Henriette Augusta "Jet" van Eek. Their son, Bob Haak (1926–2005), became an art historian and museum director. He was one of the founders of the Rembrandt Research Project and served as director of the Amsterdams Historisch Museum.

== Resistance and death ==
During World War II, Haak and his wife assisted people in hiding and kept forged identity documents and ration cards in their home.

In August 1943, their son Bob was arrested while delivering copies of Jan Campert's resistance poem De achttien dooden. The arrest led German authorities to search the family home. They found forged documents, although two Jewish people concealed in the house escaped discovery. Haak and Van Eek were subsequently arrested.

Haak was imprisoned in Kamp Vught and later transferred through Dachau to Sachsenhausen. He died at Sachsenhausen on 30 January 1945, aged 53. His officially recorded cause of death was dysentery.

== See also ==
- List of Dutch international footballers
