= Pieter J. J. van Thiel =

Dutch art historian and curator (1928–2012)

- Born: Pieter Jacobus Johannes van Thiel; 14 November 1928; Haarlem, Netherlands
- Died: 1 August 2012 (aged 83); Bennebroek, Netherlands
- Education: University of Amsterdam
- Occupations: Art historian, curator, museum director
- Years active: 1950s–1993
- Employer: Rijksmuseum
- Known for: Co-founder of the Rembrandt Research Project; scholarship on Dutch and Flemish painting
- Title: Director of Paintings

Pieter J.J. van Thiel (1928–2012) was a Dutch art historian known mostly as one of the founders of the Rembrandt Research Project.

From 1964-1991 he was director of the department of paintings at the Rijksmuseum Amsterdam, where he took over from Bob Haak. He wrote the 1976 catalogue "All the Paintings of the Rijksmuseum in Amsterdam" (a supplement was published in 1992), which was finished the same year that The Night Watch was restored.

It was during that major restoration project that he was co-author of the first three volumes of the Corpus of Rembrandt paintings.

Van Thiel was a co-founder of the Rembrandt Research Project in 1968, which he left just after retirement in 1993. He was a cataloguer and a major writer of the RRP and contributed to what was published in three volumes as A Corpus of Rembrandt Paintings between 1982 and 1989.

== Notable works ==
- Bruyn, Josua; Haak, Bob; Levie, S. H.; van Thiel, Pieter J. J.; van de Wetering, Ernst (1982). A Corpus of Rembrandt Paintings. Vol. I: 1625–1631. The Hague: Martinus Nijhoff Publishers. ISBN 978-90-247-2614-1.
- Bruyn, Josua; Haak, Bob; Levie, S. H.; van Thiel, Pieter J. J.; van de Wetering, Ernst (1986). A Corpus of Rembrandt Paintings. Vol. II: 1631–1634. Dordrecht: Martinus Nijhoff Publishers. ISBN 978-90-247-3339-2.
- Bruyn, Josua; Haak, Bob; Levie, S. H.; van Thiel, Pieter J. J.; van de Wetering, Ernst (1989). A Corpus of Rembrandt Paintings. Vol. III: 1635–1642. Dordrecht: Martinus Nijhoff Publishers. ISBN 978-90-247-3781-9.
- van Thiel, Pieter J. J. (1976). All the Paintings of the Rijksmuseum in Amsterdam: A Completely Illustrated Catalogue. Amsterdam and Maarssen: Rijksmuseum and Gary Schwartz. ISBN 978-90-6179-010-5.
- van Thiel, Pieter J. J.; de Bruyn Kops, C. J.; Cleveringa, J.; Kloek, W.; Vels Heijn, A. (1992). All the Paintings of the Rijksmuseum in Amsterdam: First Supplement, 1976–1991. Amsterdam and The Hague: Rijksmuseum and SDU Publishers. ISBN 978-90-12-06669-3.
- van Thiel, Pieter J. J.; de Bruyn Kops, C. J. (1995). Framing in the Golden Age: Picture and Frame in Seventeenth-Century Holland. Amsterdam and Zwolle: Rijksmuseum and Waanders Publishers. ISBN 978-90-6630-278-5.
- Brown, Christopher; Kelch, Jan; van Thiel, Pieter J. J. (1991). Rembrandt: The Master and His Workshop: Paintings. London and New Haven: National Gallery Publications and Yale University Press. ISBN 978-0-300-05149-0.
- van Thiel, Pieter J. J. (1999). Cornelis Cornelisz van Haarlem, 1562–1638: A Monograph and Catalogue Raisonné. Doornspijk: Davaco Publishers. ISBN 978-90-70288-96-9.
- van Thiel, Pieter J. J. (1972). 100 Dutch Paintings. Amsterdam: Rijksmuseum. OCLC 739055876.
- van Thiel, Pieter J. J. 100 Golden Memories: Dutch Paintings. Amsterdam: Rijksmuseum-Stichting.
