= Nieuwendijk, Amsterdam =

Street in Amsterdam

Nieuwendijk
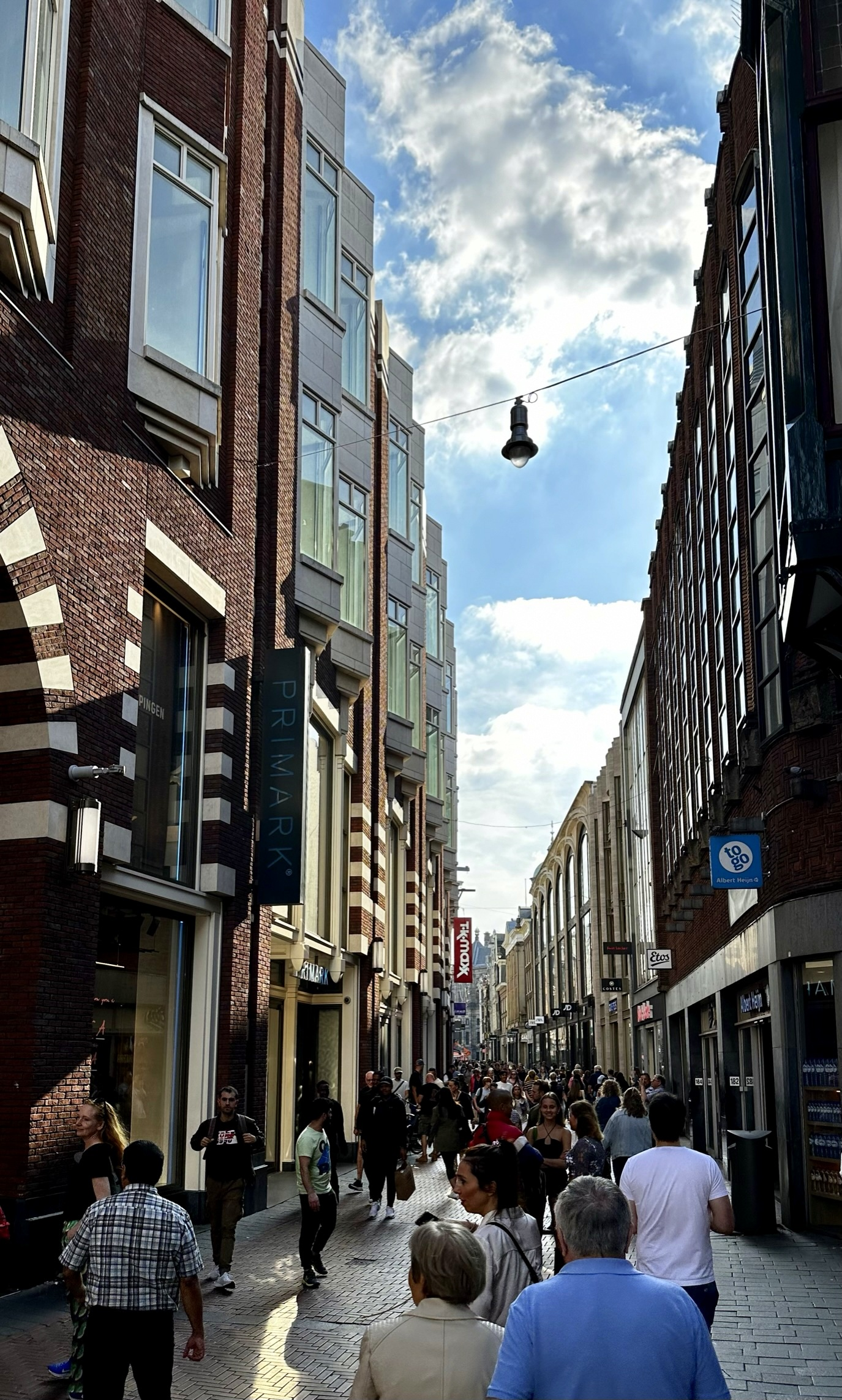

- Location within Amsterdam
- Location: Amsterdam, Netherlands
- Postal code: 1012 LZ, MA-ME, MG, MH, ML, MN, MP, MR-MT, MV, MX
- Coordinates: 52°22′33.29″N 4°53′43.19″E

Other
- Website: http://nieuwendijk.nl

The Nieuwendijk is a major shopping street in central Amsterdam. There are some 200 shops along the street. The street, which dates to the early medieval history of Amsterdam, counts 98 buildings with rijksmonument status.

The Nieuwendijk runs northeast from Dam Square, then turns left near Prins Hendrikkade. It then heads northwest, crossing the broad street Nieuwezijds Voorburgwal at Martelaarsgracht, until it hits the Singel canal, where it continues westwards as the Haarlemmerstraat. The Nieuwendijk is part of a medieval street pattern intersected by a multitude of narrow alleys. Nine alleys run between Nieuwendijk and Damrak, seven run between Nieuwendijk and Nieuwezijds Voorburgwal, and three further alleys run west and east from Nieuwendijk beyond Martelaarsgracht.

The Korte Nieuwendijk ("short Nieuwendijk"), the westernmost part between Martelaarsgracht and Singel, was pedestrianised in the 1970s. In 2013, the entire street was pedestrianised.

== History ==
=== Middle Ages ===
The Nieuwendijk is one of the oldest streets of Amsterdam. The Nieuwendijk ("new dyke") and Kalverstraat originally formed a dyke running through the western side of early medieval Amsterdam. The oldest traces of habitation in Amsterdam, dating to the late 12th century, were located on the Nieuwendijk and Oudekerksplein. Here, small farms were constructed on artificially constructed mounds, so-called terpen.

The first non-agrarian buildings in Amsterdam were built on the Nieuwendijk. Archeological excavations on the grounds of the former Cinema Royal at Nieuwendijk 154 revealed a house dating to 1225, half a century before the first mention of the town in written records. Archeological excavations also revealed a small castle at the corner of Nieuwendijk and the alley Dirk van Hasseltsteeg, built around 1275. The fortification was torn down again around 1300. This was possibly related to the 1303-1304 occupation of Amsterdam by Jan van Amstel, following which Count Wiliam III of Holland ordered the town to demolish its defences.

Shortly after 1390, a number of buildings at the southern end of Nieuwendijk were cleared to create a square along the dam on the Amstel river called De Plaats ("The Place"), and a town hall was built there. This became Dam Square.

=== Modern history ===
The Nieuwendijk was a major shopping street as early as the 17th century. Simon Goudsmit in 1870 opened a haberdashery shop at Nieuwendijk 132, Magazijn de Bijenkorf, which grew to become the present-day De Bijenkorf chain of department stores. Another successful retailer who started on the Nieuwendijk was Anton Sinkel, who opened a shop at Nieuwendijk 174–176 in 1821, which grew to a chain of stores around the country. Winkel van Sinkel ("Sinkel's shop") has since become a Dutch expression for a shop selling a wide variety of goods. The brothers Ephraim and Levi Gerzon opened their first shop on Nieuwendijk in 1889, followed by a chain of stores around the country. Fashion designer Fong Leng opened her first shop on the Nieuwendijk in 1969. Entrepreneur Roland Kahn (owner of fashion retailer MS Mode) also opened his first shop on the Nieuwendijk.

In the 1950s the Nieuwendijk became a centre of the nozem youth subculture. The more working-class, rock 'n' roll-influenced Nieuwendijk nozems, who were known as dijkers, regularly engaged in fistfights with the more educated, jazz-influenced Leidseplein nozems, known as pleiners. The term nozems was popularised by a 1955 article in Vrij Nederland magazine, "De nozems van de Nieuwendijk" ("The nozems of the Nieuwendijk").

== Residents ==
- Jacob Adriaensz Backer (1609 – 1651), painter
- Albert Greiner (1833 – 1890), photographer
- Jacob J. Hinlopen (1582 – 1629), merchant
- Jan Jacobszoon Hinlopen (1626 – 1666), merchant
- Thijmen Jacobsz Hinlopen (1537 – 1637), merchant
- Cornelis Hooft (1547 – 1627), mayor and merchant
- Walewijn van der Veen (1617–1669), merchant, attorney and New Amsterdam notary

== Gallery ==
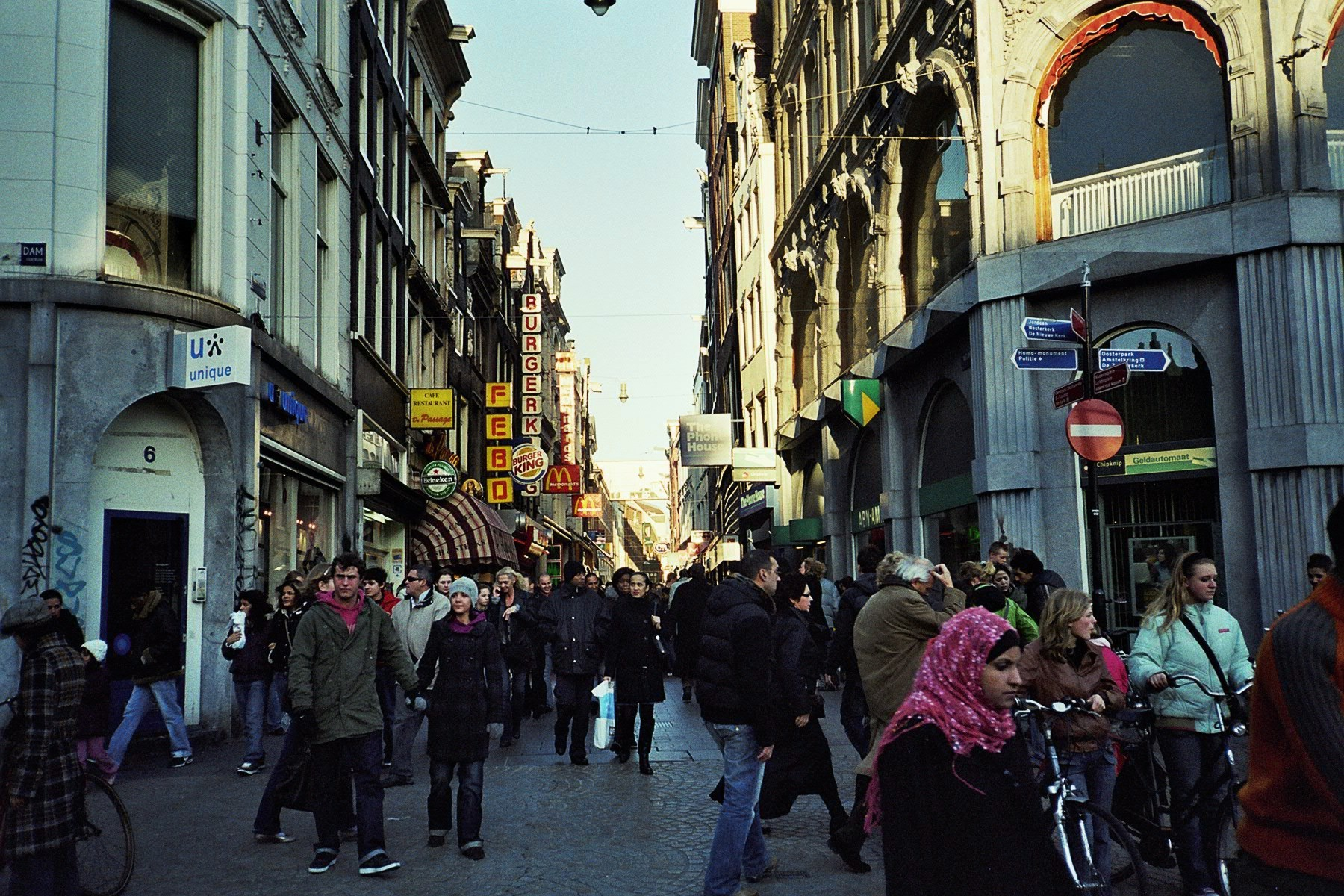
Nieuwendijk at the Dam Square end

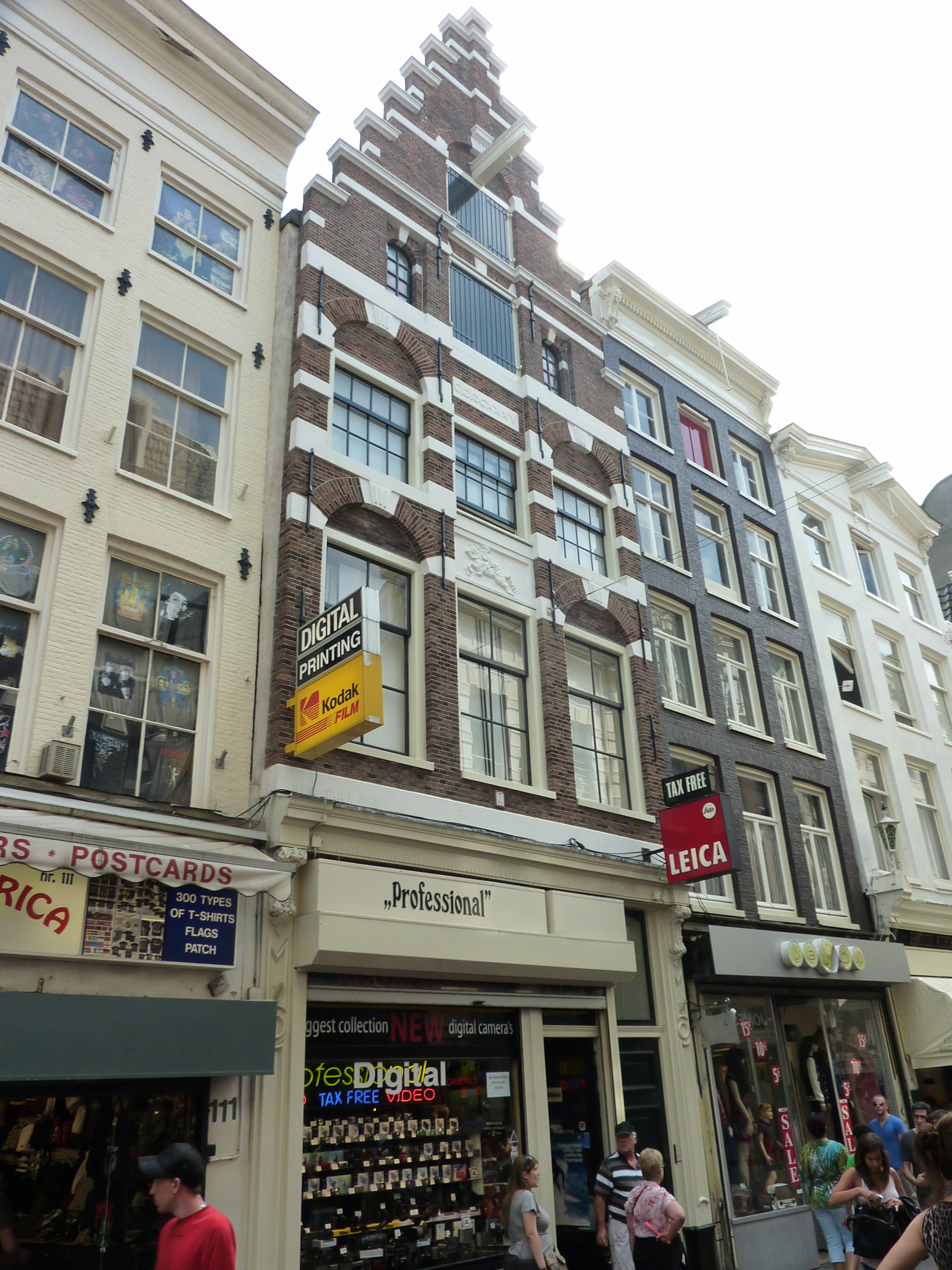
Nieuwendijk 113, a rijksmonument dating to 1635

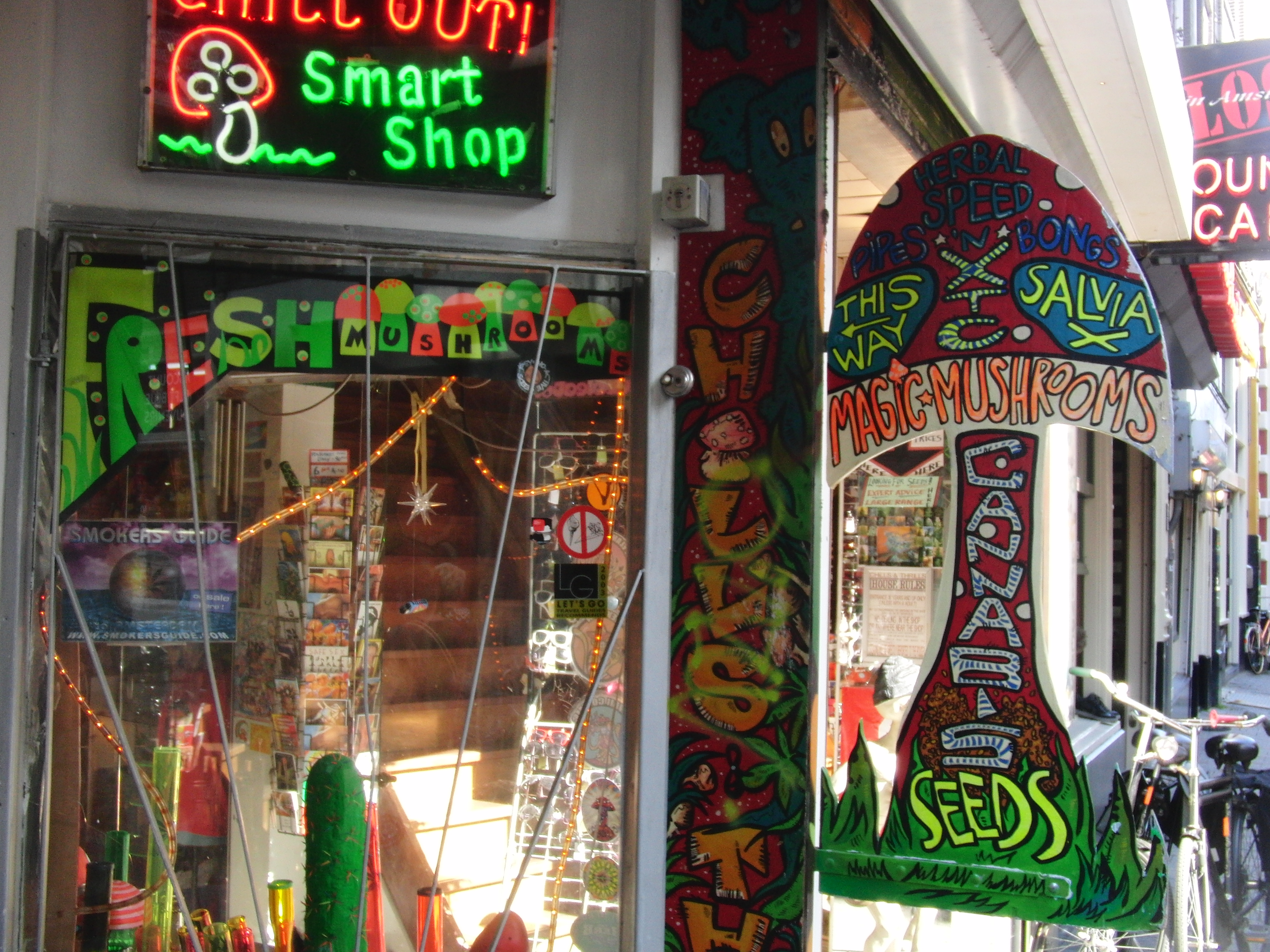
A "smartshop" at Nieuwendijk 17 selling magic mushrooms

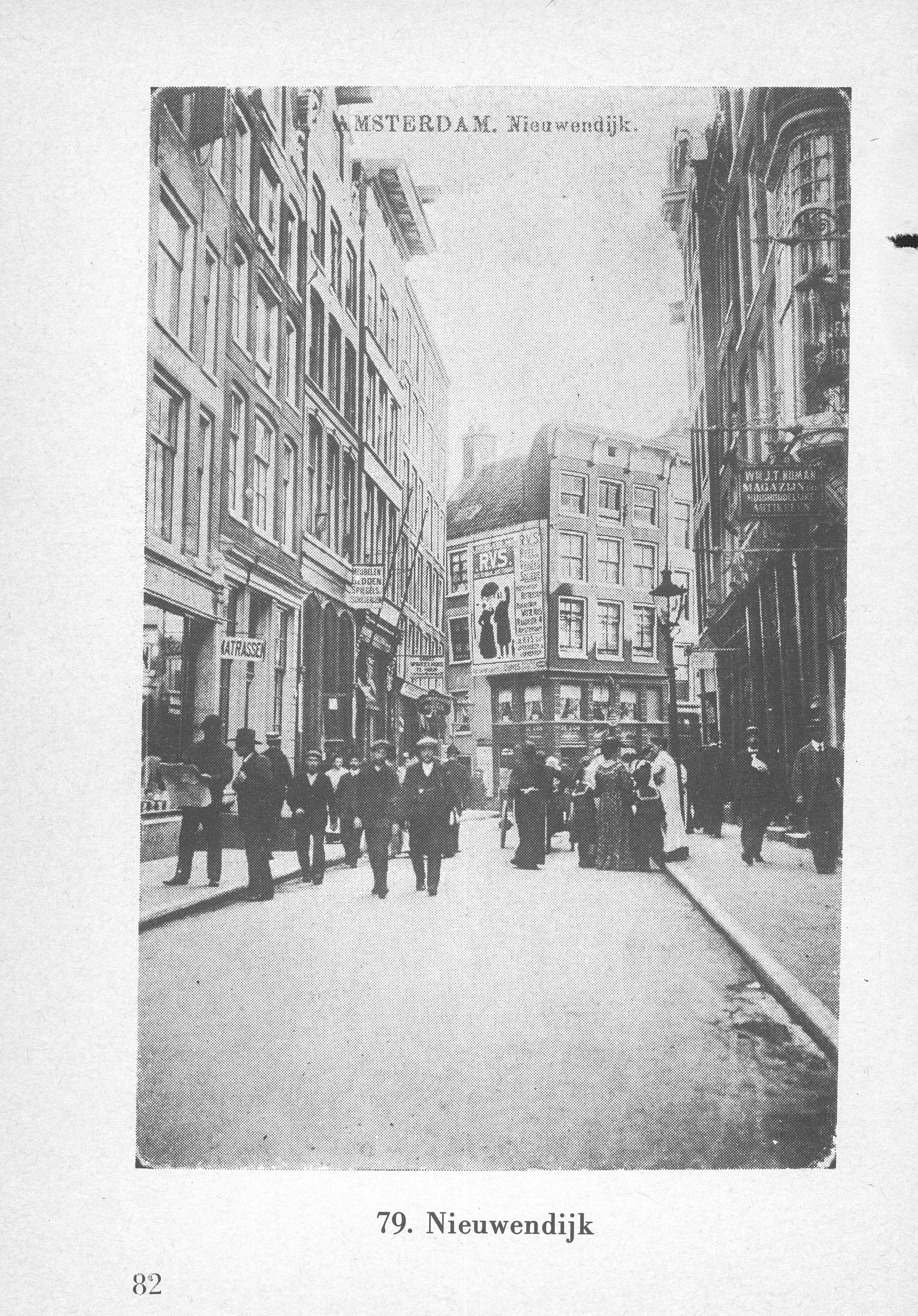
Photograph of the Nieuwendijk dating to 1900–1914

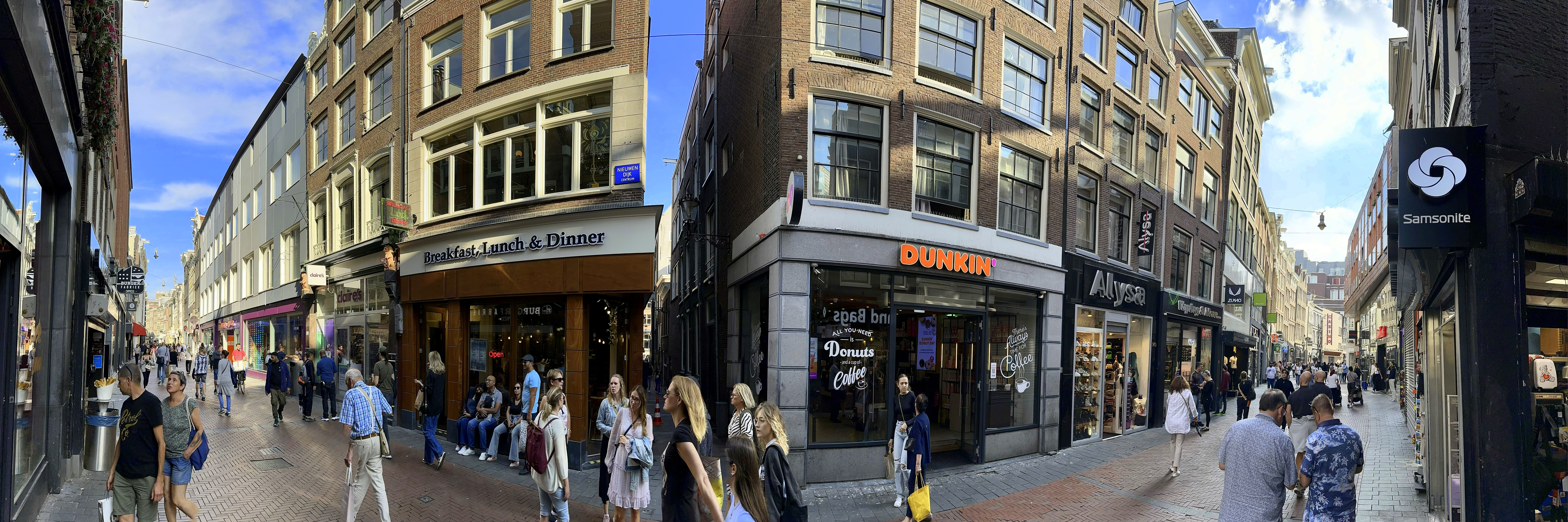
Panoramic of Nieuwendijk as viewed from its intersection with Mandenmakerssteeg
