= Fong Leng =

Chinese-Dutch fashion designer

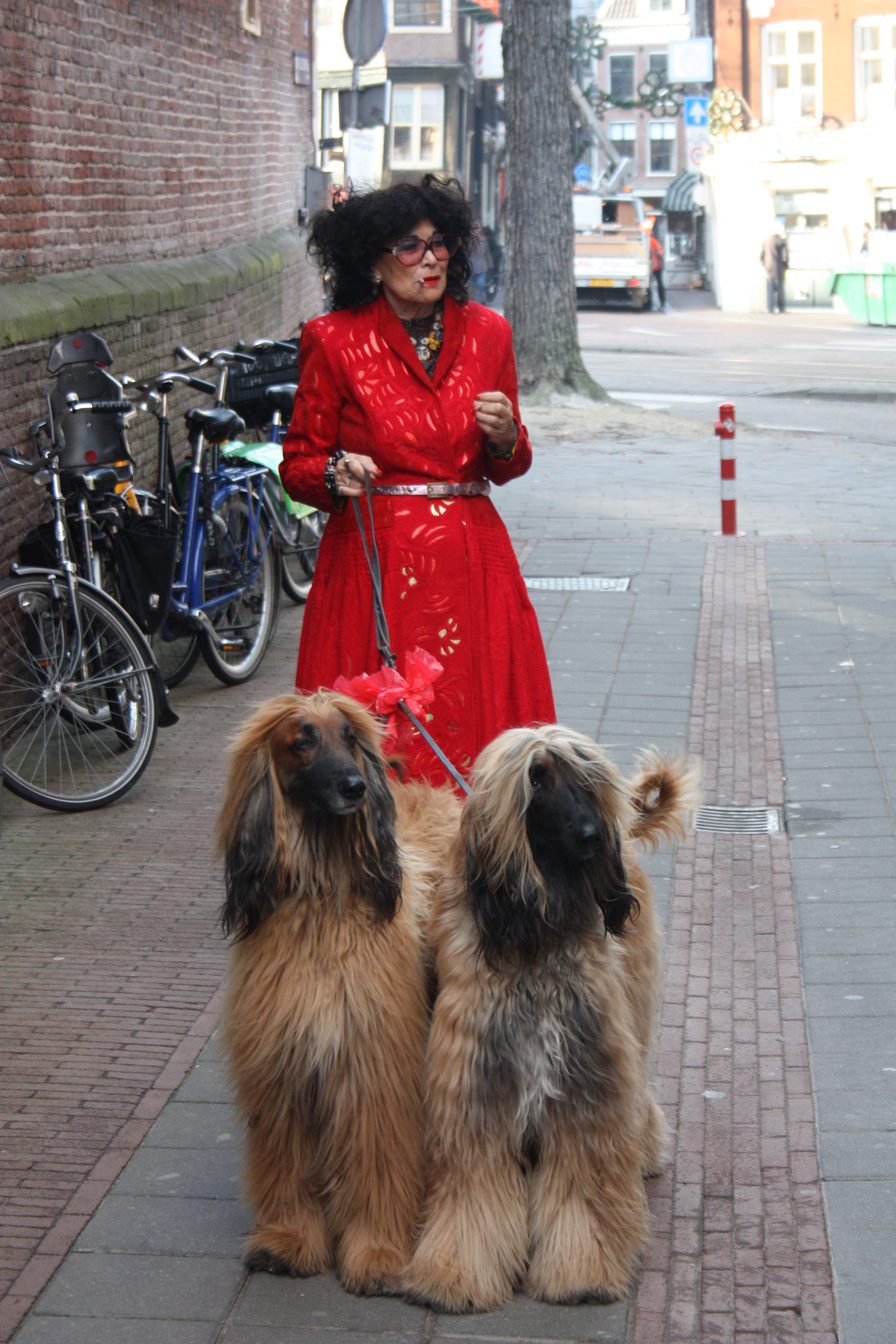
- Fong Leng entering preview of Amsterdam Museum Exhibition: Fong Leng: Fashion and Art, 2013.
- Born: August 13, 1937 (age 88); Rotterdam, Netherlands
- Occupation: Fashion designer
- Years active: 1968–present

Carla Maria Fong Leng Tsang (born 13 August 1937 in Rotterdam) is a Chinese-Dutch fashion designer. Fong Leng started a fashion boutique in 1969 in the Drugstore at the Nieuwendijk in Amsterdam. In 1971 she moved to larger premises at the P.C. Hooftstraat and called it Studio Fong Leng. She is mostly known for her extravagant cloak dresses. Fong Leng’s most notable client was Mathilde Willink, the divorced wife of the Dutch magic realist painter Carel Willink.

== Life and career ==
Fong Leng was born in Rotterdam and had a Chinese father and Dutch mother. She went to the Academie voor Beeldende Kunsten (Academy for Applied Arts) at Rotterdam where she studied Photography. After that, she had a photo press bureau for five years with her ex-husband Herbert Behrens. They made photos of various kinds for several Dutch newspapers. It is not known at what age she did all of this. Fong Leng loves to be mysterious about her age and about who she really is. In 1968 she began working as a photographer and fashion and dessin designer for the jersey manufacturer Ross International in Hoofddorp, near Amsterdam. During this employment she discovered her affinity with fabrics and clothing.

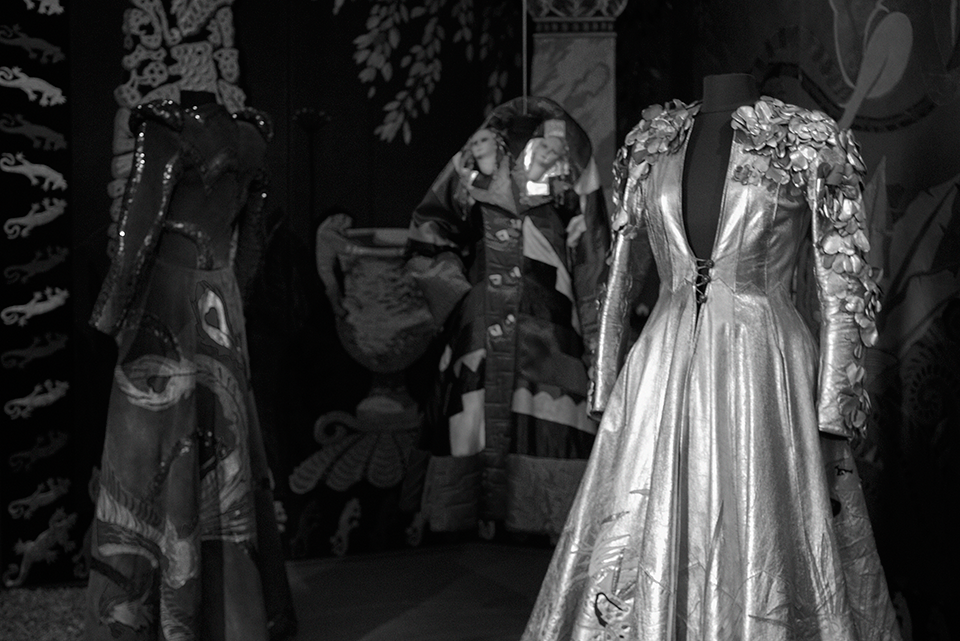
Amsterdam Museum Exhibition: Fong Leng: Fashion and Art, 2013.

=== Designs ===
The materials Fong Leng uses for her creations are leather, suede, silk, marabou feathers, and fur. She uses techniques like application, incrustation, quilting, matelassé, smocking and pleating. Most designs have figurative images on them. Fong Leng is most famous by her cloak dresses for women. High society and extravagant women like Mathilde Willink and Kate Bush wore clothes by Fong Leng. The cloak dresses were given names such as Straalmantel (Radius Cloak), Nijinski, Paradijsvogel (Paradise Bird), and Luipaardmantel (Leopard Cloak) (see picture).

=== Studio Fong Leng ===
Apart from self made designs Studio Fong Leng sold goods from different international fashion designers such as Zandra Rhodes, Ossie Clark and Alice Pollock. Studio Fong Leng's concept was something that had never been done before. She invited her customers with champagne and appetizers in her shop. Once a year the Studio organised fashion shows with dancing mannequins and loud pop music playing along. The first two shows were held at the shop, later on when crowds became too big, Fong Leng arranged places like the Beurs van Berlage, the Tropenmuseum and the De Mirandabad. Fong Leng was the artistic director of Studio Fong Leng. Together with her business partner Suzanne Kiss she opened the studio. Kiss left in 1974 but came back a couple of times when needed. Since 1974 Berry Brun became chief designer. He helped Fong Leng stay popular, but during the years he came to the conclusion that Fong Leng was too tightly holding on to her successes from the earlier years. He left Studio Fong Leng in 1984 to teach at the fashion department of the Art Academy in Arnhem.

=== Museums ===
In 1975 the Centraal Museum in Utrecht was the first museum to collect Fong Leng’s work. The museum bought it straight out of Fong Leng’s studio, so it had never been worn by anybody. The museum paid 10,000 guilders for the Straalmantel. Up to this day there are numerous museums that have creations made by Studio Fong Leng in their collections. For instance: Amsterdam Museum, Museum Rotterdam, and Kunstmuseum Den Haag. During the years there have been several exhibitions organised solely devoted to Fong Leng's designs:

- 1974, Van Gogh Museum, Amsterdam
- 1983, Historisch Kostuum Museum (nowadays Kunstmuseum Den Haag)
- 1986, Singer Museum, Laren
- 1987, Dutch TextielMuseum (Tilburg)
- 1988, Museum Princessehof, Leeuwarden
- 1997, Het Kruithuis, Den Bosch
- 1998, Diva Fong Leng, Frisia Museum, Spanbroek
- 2013, Centraal Museum, Utrecht
- 2013-2014, Fong Leng. Fashion & Art, Amsterdam Museum Amsterdam

=== Fong Leng after the Studio ===
Studio Fong Leng went bankrupt in 1987. This is due to investments in the Amsterdam Olympic Games of 1992 that didn't happen. In 1984 Amsterdam was one of the candidates to host the Olympic Games of 1992. The Dutch Olympic Committee asked Fong Leng to design merchandise. Fong Leng invested in the development of about 75 articles like T-shirts, sneakers and sunglasses. Unfortunately the Games of 1992 went to Barcelona instead and Fong Leng's designs weren't used anymore. This caused Studio Fong Leng bankruptcy. Also Fong Leng's designs weren't that popular anymore. As Berry Brun already stated, the designs didn't show the evolution of fashion. This is why from the end of the 1980s Fong Leng shifted her focus to interior design. To this day she mostly concentrates on making what she calls paintings in leather. For this she uses the leather techniques she used in her earlier career.

== Bibliography ==
- Alrichs, Corine. ‘Van stoffige kleding naar gedachten van stof. De huidige status van hedendaags modedesign in musea’. Master Thesis 2009.
- Boffin, Renee, Fong Leng: Modeontwerpster, Amsterdam (Kobra) 1982. ISBN 90-6393-777-6.
- Dekker, Annemarie den, Fong Leng. Fashion and art, [mus.cat.] Leerdam (Booxs) 2013, ISBN 978-90-71361-00-5.
- ‘Fong Leng’, Goed Handwerk, no. 95, May 1983.
- Fong Leng, Fong-Leng door Fong-Leng, Amsterdam (Bakker) 2003, ISBN 90-351-2567-3.
- Lampe, Bregje, ‘That ’70s Show’, De Volkskrant, 13 December 2013.
- Schacknat, Karin, Fong-Leng, Zwolle/Arnhem (d'Jonge Hond/ArtEZ Press ) 2010, ISBN 978-90-8910-066-5.
