= Jacob J. Hinlopen =

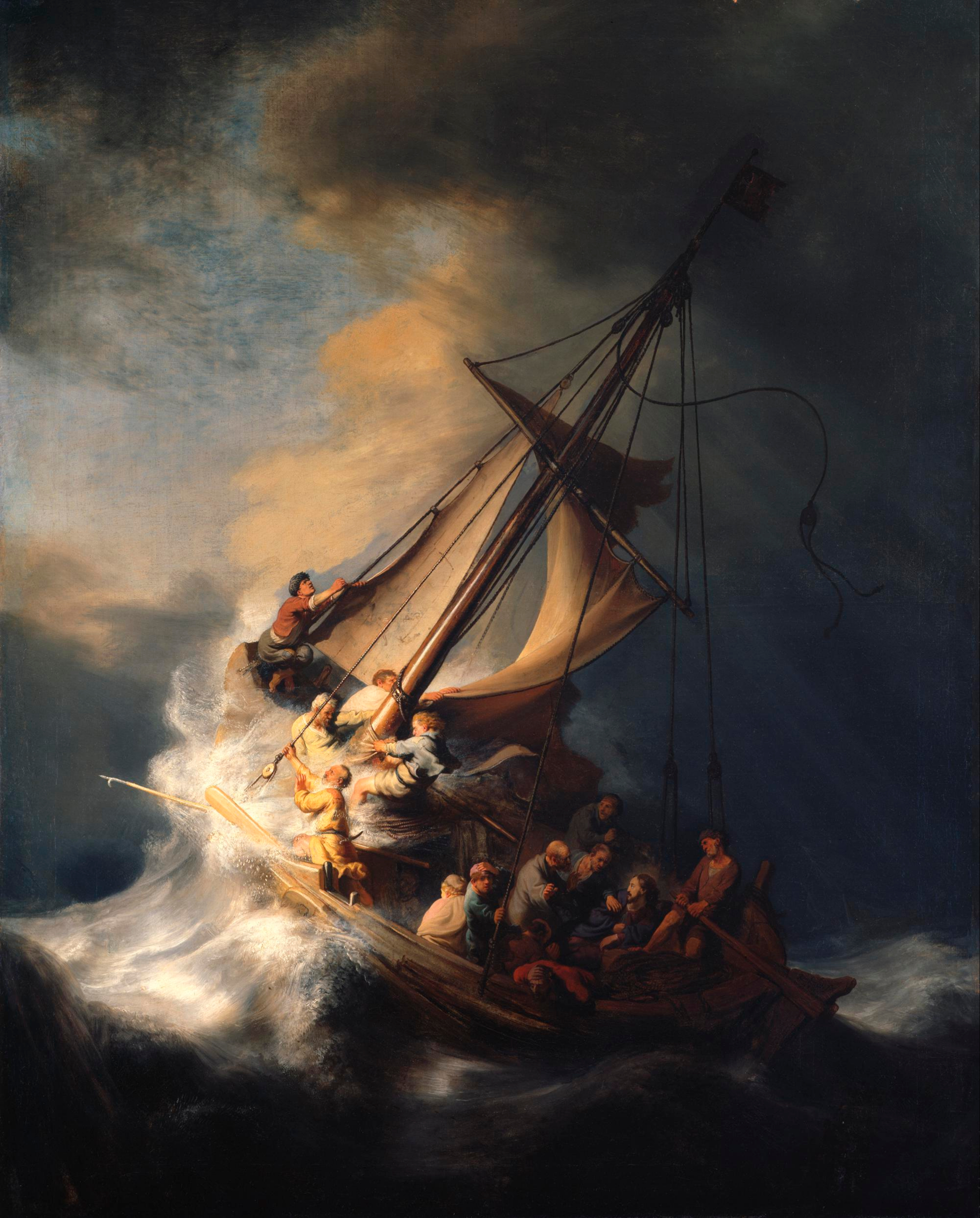
Christus in the storm on the lake; Rembrandt (1633) 160 x 127cm, stolen from Isabella Stewart Gardner Museum

Jacob J. Hinlopen (1582 – 1629 in Amsterdam) lived in a house with Hinlopen in the gable, now at 155 Nieuwendijk. He traded in cloth and Indian wares. In 1602 he was co-founder of the Dutch East India Company in Enkhuizen, and his descendants inherited very old stocks. In 1617, he became the first person of Flemish origin to obtain a seat on the City Council.

== Jacob J. Hinlopen, the father ==
Jacob J. Hinlopen, became a friend of Joost van den Vondel, who was also an Arminian at that time. His wife was Sara de Wael (1591–1652), the daughter of a Haarlem burgomaster, beer brewer, and investor in the new development, the Lastage. The couple inhabited Herengracht 130, a double-wide canal house.

His brother Frans traded with Dutch Loango-Angola; his brother Tijmen, for whom the Hinlopen Strait on Svalbard was named, was the director of the Noordsche Company and traded with Muscovy. His brother-in-law, Johan de Wael, burgomaster of Haarlem, was imprisoned for some weeks in 1650 at Loevestein Castle with Jacob de Witt, before the raid on Amsterdam by stadholder William II of Orange.

== Jacob J. Hinlopen, son ==
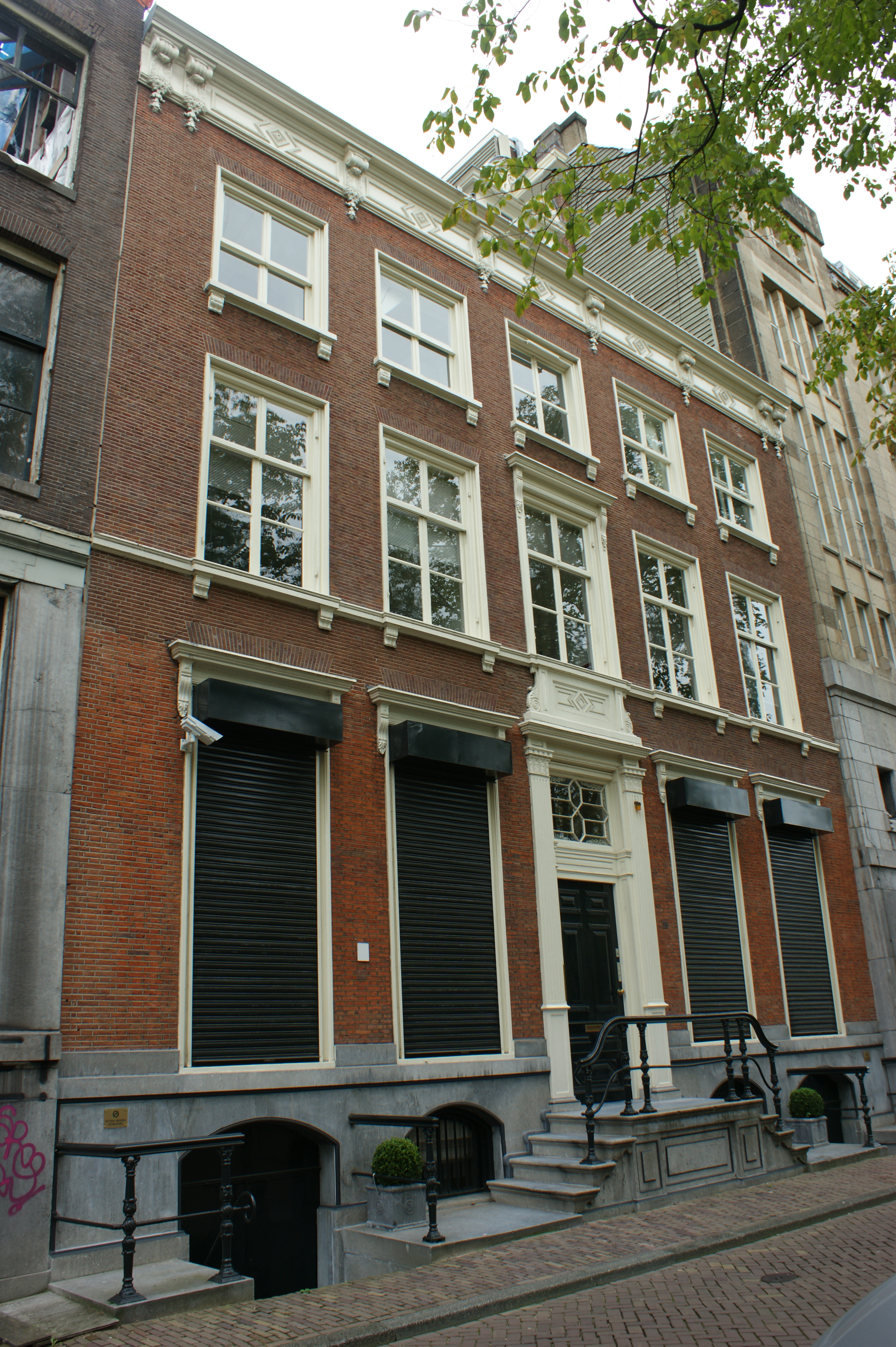
Amsterdam - Herengracht 130

After the death of their mother, the two sons inherited the mansion designed by Philips Vingboons. Today, Pijnenburg in the surroundings of Soest remains the largest domain in private possession. The ancestral house near the harbour was sold. The brothers bought plots in the Jordaan, hired a carpenter, and speculated in the construction of cheap houses.

Jacob became commissioner of the Desolate Boedelkamer (Chamber of Insolvent Estates) and was involved in the selling of Rembrandt possessions and the inheritance of Titus van Rijn, the son of Rembrandt.

Like his brother Jan, Jacob J. Hinlopen (1621–1679) is also known as a collector of paintings, including Samson and The Woman Taken in Adultery, both by Rembrandt. The latter work was bought in 1657 for 1500 guilders at auction from Johannes de Renialme, an art trader. It was, at that time, held in higher regard than any other work by Rembrandt.

Jacob lived on the Kloveniersburgwal, opposite Jan Six, who was related to his wife, Anna Tholinx. Until his death, Jacob J. Hinlopen was a tutor to Johanna Maria and Sara, the two children of his brother Jan J. Hinlopen. After his burial, the paintings formerly belonging to his brother were assigned by lot to his nieces.

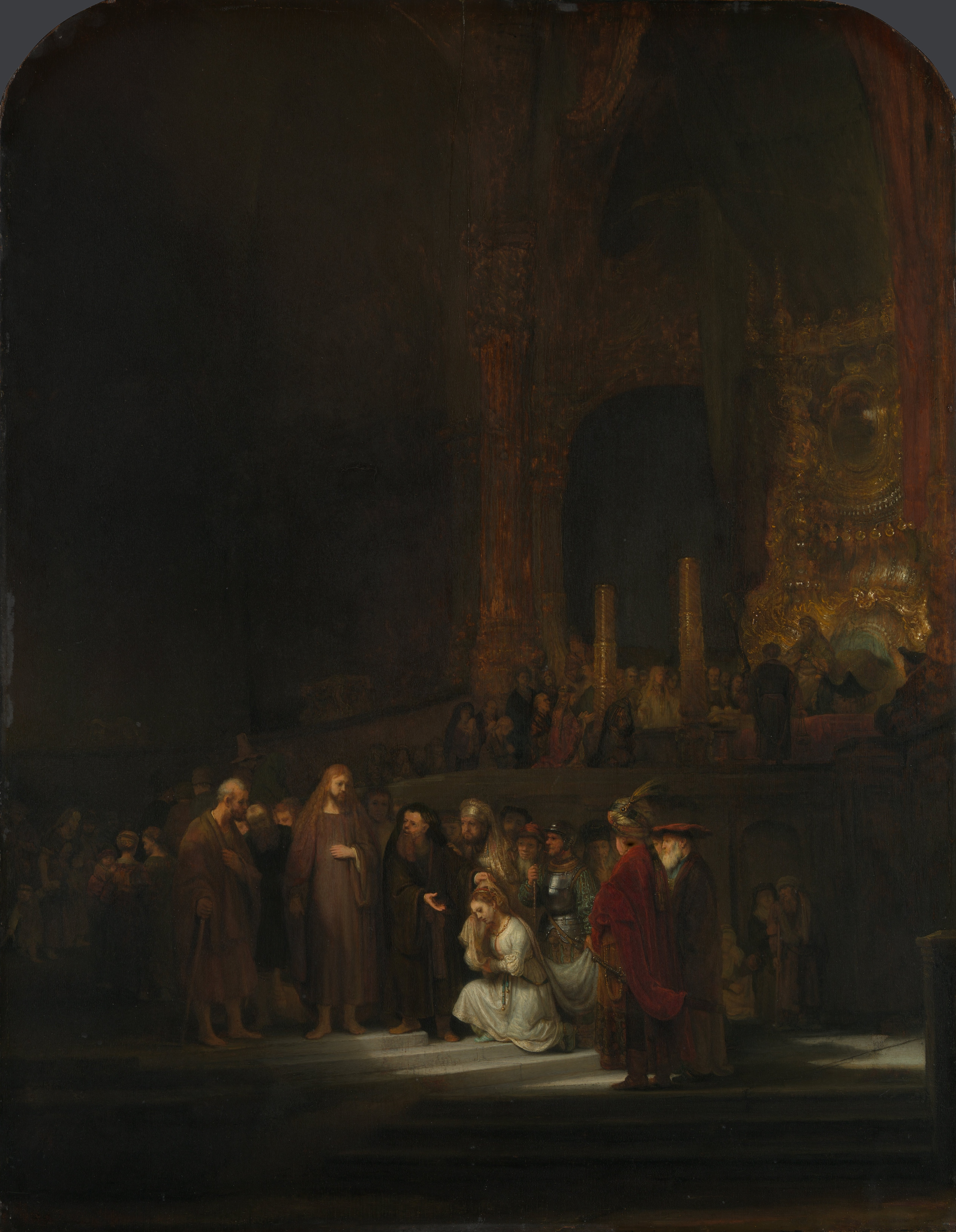
Christ and the woman taken in adultery. Rembrandt (1644), in the National Gallery, London

== Jacob J. Hinlopen, the grandson ==
Jacob J. Hinlopen (1644–1705), grandson of Jacob J. Hinlopen, married Deborah Popta. This Jacob held very many positions, among which director of the VOC, schout and burgomaster. He moved in 1680 to Golden Bend, in a house which is now the Goethe Institute. He was the owner of the renowned Rembrandt painting "The Storm on the Sea of Galilee". This fairly large painting was stolen in 1990 from the Isabella Stewart Gardner Museum in Boston.
