= Bob Haak (art expert) =

Dutch art historian and curator (1926–2005)

- Born: 22 January 1926; Amsterdam, Netherlands
- Died: 15 May 2005 (aged 79); Amsterdam, Netherlands
- Occupations: Art historian and museum curator
- Employer(s): Rijksmuseum Amsterdam; Amsterdam Museum
- Known for: Co-founding the Rembrandt Research Project
- Notable work: Rembrandt: His Life, His Work, His Time; The Golden Age: Dutch Painters of the Seventeenth Century
- Parents: Jur Haak (father); Jet van Eek (mother)
- Awards: Karel van Mander Prize (1985)

Bob Haak (22 January 1926 – 15 May 2005) was a Dutch art expert known mostly as one of the founders of the Rembrandt Research Project.

== Career ==
From 1954 to 1963 he worked in the department of paintings at the Rijksmuseum Amsterdam. From 1963 he was curator at the Amsterdam Museum, the museum which today is still the formal owner of the Rembrandt paintings on show at the Rijks, including The Night Watch.

In 1956 he worked on the Rembrandt commemorative exhibition in the Rijksmuseum, where certain paintings were on show which hadn't been back to Amsterdam for decades, such as the pendant portraits of Maerten Soolmans and Oopjen Coppit. It was during this project that involved leading Rembrandt experts that Haak first got the idea to start a research project to assist in attributions.

== Rembrandt Research Project ==
In 1968 he co-founded the Rembrandt Research Project (RRP), together with Josua Bruyn, Jan Gerrit van Gelder, Jan Emmens, Simon Levie, and Pieter J.J. van Thiel. The project's aim was a comprehensive study of all of Rembrandt's paintings and resolving the uncertainties surrounding the authenticity of many paintings, to which several scholars had turned their attention.

That was the year Horst Gerson published his Rembrandt catalog raisonné, 1968, in which he drastically reduced the number of Rembrandt paintings to 420.

The next year, 1969 Gerson published an update of Abraham Bredius' 1935 catalog of 611 Rembrandt paintings with his attributions based on connoiseurship. Haak responded in 1969 by publishing his bestselling work Rembrandt: His Life, His Work, His Time in three languages. Though this book only included less than a third of the paintings mentioned in Bredius' 1935 work, it also included several works by contemporary artists and several drawings and etchings by Rembrandt that had previously not been published.

The book changed the way Rembrandt scholars viewed his paintings by putting them into the perspective of other contemporary works by Rembrandt and his pupils, whether it be etchings, drawings, or everyday political events. The scholarly rivalry continued during the course of the 1970s, but there was increasing pressure to publish catalogs and the long-awaited results of the RRP were published in three volumes as A Corpus of Rembrandt Paintings between 1982 and 1989.

The decision to continue the project contributed to tensions within the team. Ernst van de Wetering advocated a broader method combining technical examination, archival research, and provenance. Haak had applied a similarly contextual approach to his study of Rembrandt's pupils and contemporaries. His 1982 book, The Golden Age: Dutch Painters of the Seventeenth Century, received the Karel van Mander Prize in 1985.

However, differences of opinion within the team came to a head in 1993, when Haak withdrew from the RRP, along with Bruyn, Levie, and Van Thiel. They left the further organization of the project to their fellow team member Ernst van de Wetering, who continued to publish another three volumes, finishing with the sixth volume which included a list of 348 autograph paintings in 2014.

== Family and World War II ==
Haak was the son of Jur Haak and Jet van Eek. His father was a footballer in the Netherlands national team, and a record high jumper and both parents were teachers at the Montesorri school in Amsterdam. The whole family were active in the resistance during the Germany occupation.

In August 1943, Bob was arrested while trying to deliver a Jan Campert book to some family friends. The Nazis raided his parents house that night and, finding falsified documents (though failing to find the two Jewish people in hiding in the house), deported them to separate concentration camps.

His mother died of "malaria" in Reichenbach in December 1944, his father died of exhaustion in Sachsenhausen in January 1945. Netwerk Oorlogsbronnen records Langenbielau as Henriette's place of death on 6 December 1944 and Sachsenhausen as Jurriaan's place of death on 30 January 1945; confirmation of the stated causes of death remains needed.
