= Geelvinck =

Geelvinck ("yellow finch") was a Dutch surname. The family died out in the early 19th century.

Some notable members of the family include:

- Jan Cornelis Geelvinck, the son of a merchant in beans and peas, and involved in the West India Company. He was the first in the family who became burgomaster or mayor in Amsterdam.
- Jan Cornelis's son Cornelis Geelvinck was also a burgomaster in Amsterdam and involved in the West India Company.
- Cornelis's son Albert Geelvinck was a lawyer and involved in Surinam. He married a rich orphan, Sara Hinlopen, the daughter of Jan Jacobszoon Hinlopen. The Museum Geelvinck-Hinlopen is named after this couple.
- Cornelis's eldest son Joan Geelvinck (1644–1707), a merchant and politician, who was allowed by the Dutch East India Company to baptize the Geelvink, one of the three ships under the command of Willem de Vlamingh who had orders to explore the Australian west coast in 1696. The Geelvink Channel on the west coast of Australia received its name. The Geelvink Bay and the Geelvink Islands near Western New Guinea were discovered in 1705. Also the East Geelvink Bay languages, the Geelvink pygmy parrot, Geelvink Bay flying fox and Geelvink pygmy tree frog carry the name of the ship.
- Joan's son Lieve Geelvinck was a burgomaster and married in 1730 the richest woman in Amsterdam. Lieve was a powerful republican; in 1734 the prince William IV of Orange and his wife Anna of Hanover left the city of Amsterdam within an hour, after being received by him.

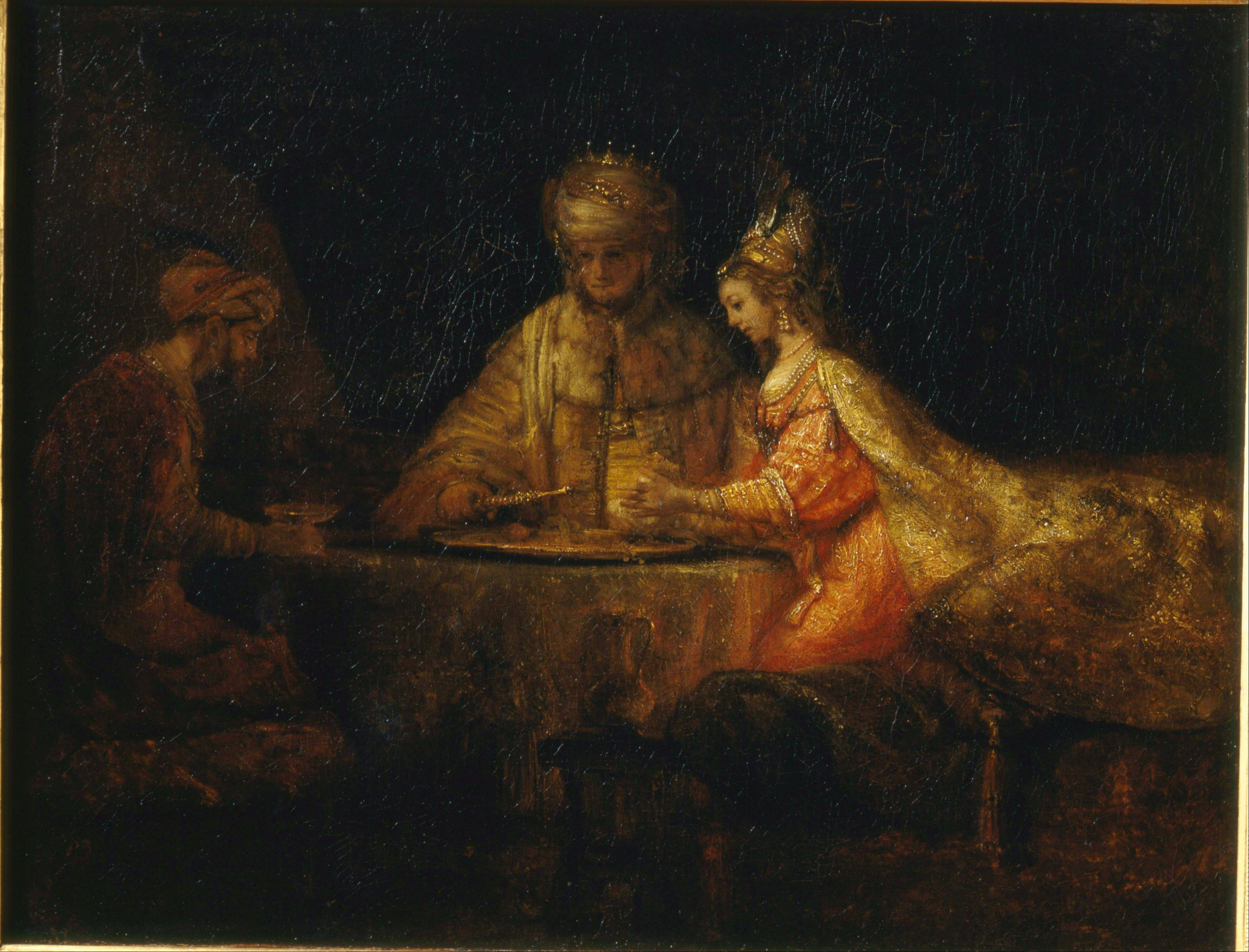
Ahasuerus and Haman at the Feast of Esther, by Rembrandt (1660), Pushkin Museum

- Lieve's son, Nicolaes Geelvinck, married in 1729 the daughter of the richest woman in Amsterdam. He was married three times. Helped by his father-in-law, he became mayor of Amsterdam in 1748. Within a few months one third of the vroedschap was removed by the stadtholder William IV of Orange. Geelvinck also lost his seat in the Admiralty of Amsterdam, despite widespread expectations that he would lead reforms. Ahasuerus and Haman at the Feast of Esther, a painting by Rembrandt, was given to him by his great-aunt Sara Hinlopen.
- Nicolaes's son Nicolaas Geelvinck, lord of Stabroek, was an administrator of the West India Company; between 1784 and 1812 Georgetown in Guyana was called Stabroek.
- In 1756 Nicolaes's son Lieve married Catharina Elisabeth Hasselaer, the daughter of a diplomat. In 1757 he died. The widow Geelvinck was a close friend of Belle van Zuylen and James Boswell, who called her "la belle veuve".
- Nicolaes's son Joan Geelvinck (1737–1802), was a Patriot and in 1787 a burgomaster for only five months. He fled to Paris and joined Lafayette.
- Joan's daughter Maria Petronella Geelvinck (1769–1831), married in 1787 Anton Tschiffely (1759–1824), until 1785 in the Dutch military service. Maria Petronella moved with him to Switzerland and took a painting with her by Gabriël Metsu. Tschiffely, since 1795 a member of the Bern city council, used the title Lord of Stabroek. In 1832 the painting was sold by her inheritants to the Gemäldegalerie, Berlin.

== Family tree ==
Jan Cornelis Geelvinck	1) Griete Govertsdr. Wuytiers; 2) Aecht de Vlaming van Oudtshoorn	Jan Jacobszoon Hinlopen
1) Elisabeth Velecker	Cornelis	2) Margaretha Bicker
Anna van Loon	Joan	4 other children: Cornelis, Brigitta, Coenraad, Dirk	Albert	Sara Hinlopen
Catharina Clara	Willem Boreel
1) Agatha Theodora van Bambeeck	Lieve	2) Anna de Haze
Agatha Levina	Anna Elisabeth	Catharina Jacoba
1) Johanna Jacoba Graafland (daughter of Anna de Haze)	Nicolaes	2) Hester Hooft; 3) Maria Margaretha Corver
Nicolaas	Joan	5 other children
Anton Tschiffely	Maria Petronella
