= Lieve Geelvinck =

Dutch politician (1676–1743)

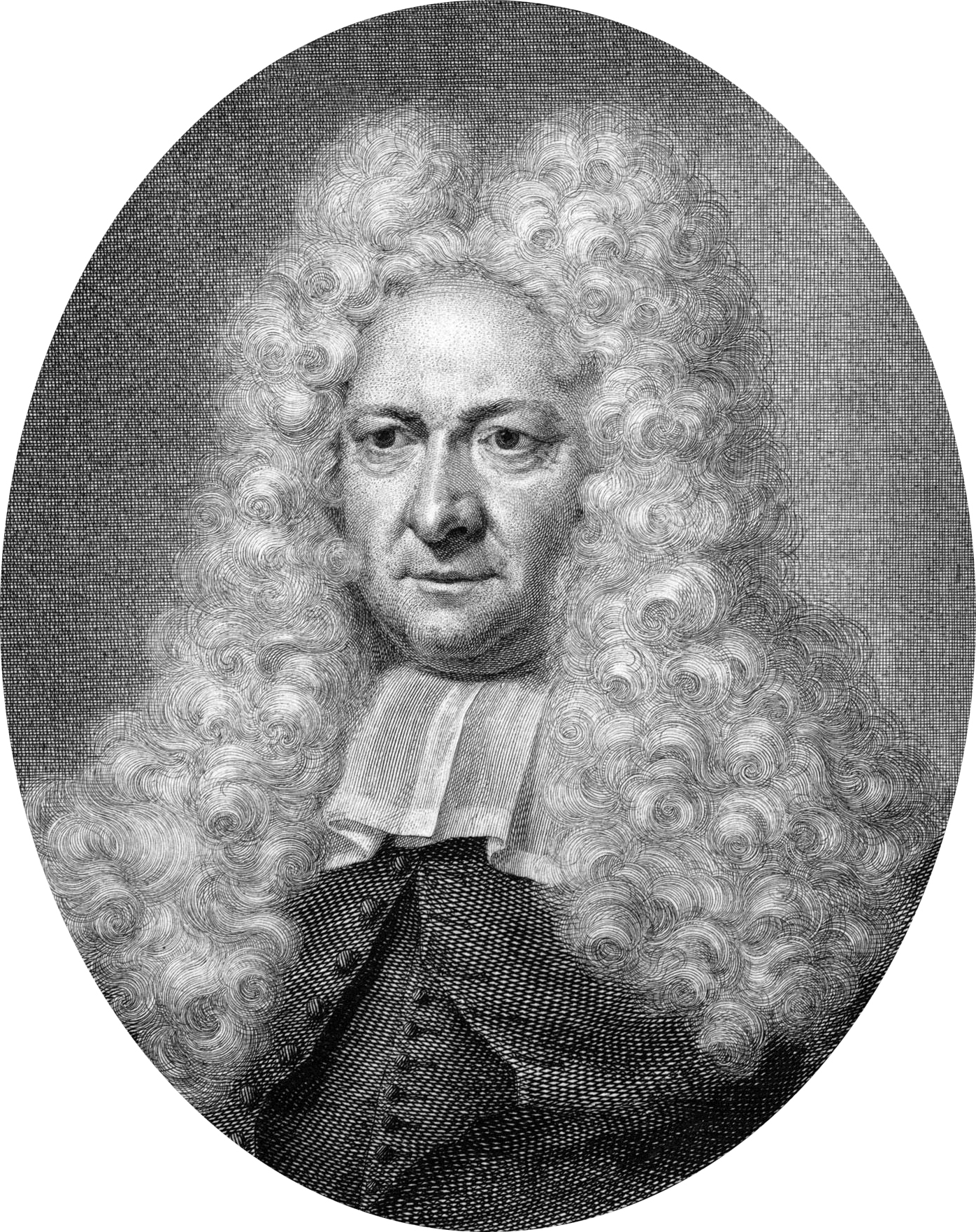
Lieve Geelvinck

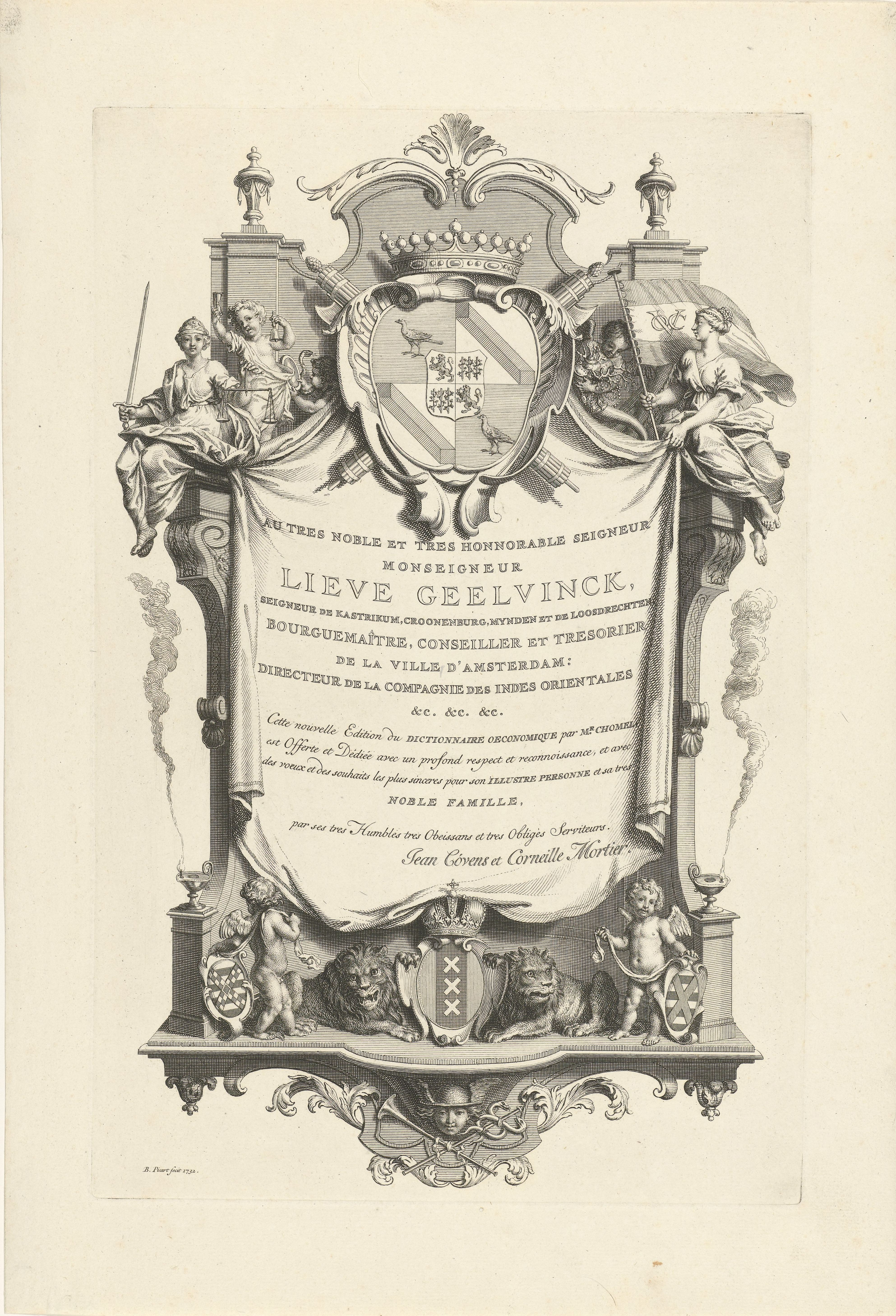
Allegorische titelpagina met verwijzingen naar de stad Amsterdam by Bernard Picart

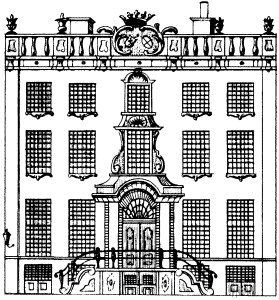
Herengracht 520 around 1770, engraving by Caspar Philips for his Grachtenboek.

Lieve Geelvinck (28 May 1676 – 22 August 1743) was the son of Joan Geelvinck and grandson of Cornelis Geelvinck and, following them into the vroedschap, he became administrator of the Dutch East India Company and member of the Council of State. He became mayor of Amsterdam for the first time in 1720. Through political marriage alliances, the Geelvinck family had already played an important role the council of Amsterdam for years on end, but in the first half of the 18th century all but one or two of the city's mayors were related to each other.

== Life ==
Lieve was born, one of twins, in Amsterdam. His mother was Anna von Loon and his father Joan Geelvinck (1644–1707), since 1694 a member of the vroedschap, after the death of his brother Albert Geelvinck. Lieve Geelvinck married Agatha Theodora of Bambeeck in 1699, who died in 1713. Lieve Geelvinck married a second time in 1730, to Anna de Haze, then the richest woman in Amsterdam. He moved in at his wife's city palace on Herengracht, these days next to the Museum Geelvinck-Hinlopen. The couple already knew each other, for Lieve's son had married Anna's daughter the preceding year. Their country house was in Nieuw-Loosdrecht, which she inherited, besides three million guilders, from a childless great-uncle. Through Anna, Lieve received the lordships of Stabroek and of both Loosdrechts.

Lieve Geelvinck was an important political figure and in 1734 organized a reception for William IV, Prince of Orange, and Anna of Hanover. In 1738 he gave a job as post master to his grandson, of course someone else had to do the real work. In the year 1743, four (ex-)mayors, including Lieve died. The atmosphere in the mayors room would change strongly. Lieve Geelvinck died, aged 67, in Amsterdam, and was buried in the Nieuwe Kerk; the Dam Square was crowded for his funeral, in a manner hardly seen before. Lieve Geelvinck was followed as mayor by his son Nicolaes Geelvinck.

== Children ==
In 1749 the four children of Lieve Geelvinck inherited a considerable sum from their great aunt Sara Hinlopen. The eldest, Agatha Levina Geelvinck, widow of Dirk Trip, the richest man in Amsterdam, inherited the house at Herengracht 518 (now Museum Geelvinck Hinlopen Huis), including the carriage house with the stable; Anna Elisabeth, widow of Nicolaas Pancras and Jan Lucas Pels, inherited valuable stocks, all her books and three guilders cash. (She gave money to have a church organ in Beverwijk, built by Christiaen Müller). Catharina Jacoba, the youngest and widely known for her beauty, married Constantijn Sautijn, had as a child received a princely annuity. She inherited jewels, pearls and diamonds, but also 140 year-old shares in the Dutch East India Company in Enkhuizen. Nicolaes Geelvinck got a collection of letters of debts, shares, bonds and fields in one of the oldest polders in Holland, named the Zijpe. During the "pachtersoproer" (= tax collectors uproar) in 1747 Nicolaes Geelvinck quickly fled the city hall, before the mayor's room was occupied by the people and demonstratively reached a ceiling-mop from the window. As an adversary of the stadholder, he was a year later removed from the vroedschap.

== Bibliography ==
- This article is based entirely or partially on its equivalent on Dutch Wikipedia.
