= Friedrich Wilhelm von Thulemeyer =

German diplomat (1735–1811)

- Born: November 9, 1735; Berlin, Prussia
- Died: June 6, 1811 (aged 75); Berlin, Prussia
- Education: Berlin, Frankfurt, Paris
- Occupations: Diplomat in the Hague, Minister in Berlin
- Children: Frederike Louise

Friedrich Wilhelm von Thulemeyer or Frederick William von Thulemeier was born or baptized on November 9, 1735. He died July 6, 1811, also in Berlin. In 1763 he was sent by Frederick the Great as a diplomat in the Republic of the Seven United Provinces. In 1784/85 he was one of the architects of a trade relations between the US and Prussia. In 1788 he became justice minister under Friedrich Wilhelm II of Prussia. Of particular importance is - even today - his collection of music prints.

== Life ==
Thulemeyer was the son of Wilhelm Heinrich von Thulemeyer, a royal Prussian Minister of State and War and a member of the Tabakskollegium. His family can be traced back to around 1560, located in the Principality of Lippe. His mother, Ernestine von Schilden, came from Hanover. When his father suddenly died his mother was only 34. The young Thulemeyer was educated at public expense, most probably on the royal Joachimsthalsches Gymnasium, while he was the godson of Friedrich Wilhelm I of Prussia. Thulemeyer studied law in Frankfurt and was trained by a Mr. Passavant. According to Von Putkamer he moved to Paris after finishing his studies. In 1763 he obtained a post in The Hague. On behalf of Frederick the Great, he was involved to arrange a marriage between the prince William V of Orange and the sixteen-year-old Wilhelmine of Prussia.

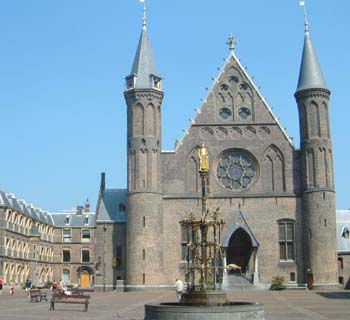
Binnenhof, even then the political center of the Netherlands

Thulemeyer was poorly rewarded and had difficulties to pay his expenses. Around 1782 or before he made acquaintance with a rich widow Agatha Theodora Geelvinck (Amsterdam, 1739 - Hanau, 1805) who paid for his expenses. She came from a powerful and very rich family of burgemeesters from Amsterdam and lived almost next to the French Embassy. Both her brothers Nicolaas Geelvinck, Joan Geelvinck and her daughter Constancia van Lynden van Hoevelaken had either close relations with the Patriots or with the stadholder. Frederick the Great did not allow to marry her, may be while his independence was in danger. Thulemeyer did improve his financial situation and moved to an elegant house near the Binnenhof. The rumours about his venality did not diminish.

Thulemeyer had good diplomatic relations. In 1784/1785 Thulemeyer cared for the important trading relationship between Prussia and the United States through his contacts in the Hague John Adams, and Thomas Jefferson and Benjamin Franklin in Paris. Thulemeyer dealt with the free ports of Emden and Stettin to set up trade.

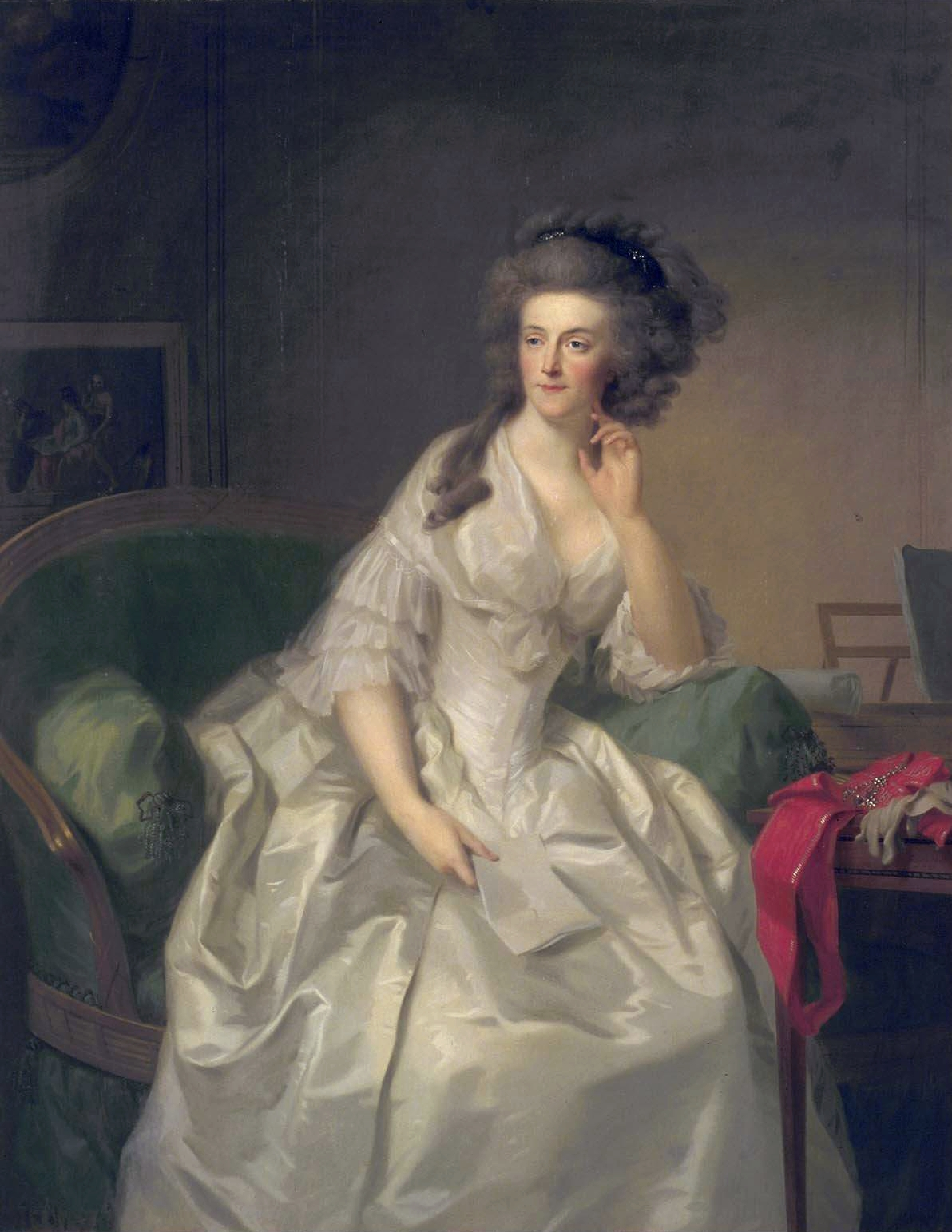
Portrait of princess Wilhelmine by J.F.A. Tischbein

== Troubles in the Netherlands ==
In the meantime, the decisions of the stadholder were amazingly controversial and the prince threatened, in the presence of his wife and Thulemeyer, to leave the country. The stadholdarian family left the Hague and after a year settled down in Nijmegen, not far from the border. The French ambassador Marquis de Vérac, and Thulemeyer concocted a compromise whereby the Stadholder's military functions were replaced by a Council including the Princess, the Pensionaries and leading councillors of both the Patriot and Orangist factions. In October 1786 Johann Eustach of Görtz was sent to The Hague, but temptations in democratic sense, even demanded by both diplomats failed. Thulemeyer requested the patriots should "... moderate the revolution, disband the Free corps and accept a Franco-Prussian mediation even if it meant the return of the Stadholder to The Hague."

Thulemeyer dealt with the British Ambassador James Harris, 1st Earl of Malmesbury, but was not taken into confidence when the princess, at the end of June 1787, tried to travel with two coaches and four chaises to The Hague. Her path was blocked outside Schoonhoven by members of the Free Corps from Gouda. The princess was held at a farm in Goejanverwellesluis until further advice was received. She and her accompany were treated well and offered wine, beer and tobacco. The princess was told that she could not proceed without permission from Estates of Holland. The princess waited in vain and returned after a day or two, back to her husband.

Within a few days her brother, Frederick William II of Prussia the new king of Prussia, called for satisfaction. It came to an ultimatum and Thulemeyer had to tell the "Staten van Holland" the decision made. On September 13, 1787, when Holland refused to apologize the Dutch Republic was occupied by Charles William Ferdinand, Duke of Brunswick.

Simon Schama stated: "Thulemeyer was not above a falsification or two. Paid by Finckenstein, the head of the "Francophile" party in Berlin, he had good reason to try to avert war. So, playing the French game of rumour as deterrent, he relayed false information to the King supporting the most pessimistic reports on the Givet Camp." In 1788 Thulemeyer traveled back to Berlin. He was replaced as ambassador by the energetic Graf von Alvensleben.

Finally he was paid for his work as an envoy and Thulemeyer bought an estate in Küssow, Kr. Pyritz, Pomerania, currently in the Pyrzyce County in the Polish West Pomeranian Voivodeship. After his death in 1811 his daughter Louise, born from a connection with Eleanor Louise Busse - it is not sure he married her - received legitimacy because of the inheritance.

== Estate ==
- The 4,000 books, that Thulemeyer had brought from the Netherlands, were given to the Royal Joachimsthalschen Gymnasium. Today some of these books are kept in the Berlin State Library.
- Particularly noteworthy is his music collection with very good copies of compositions by Carl Philipp Emanuel Bach, Johann Joachim Quantz, Christoph Schaffrath, which he bought from Christoph Nichelmann.
- His correspondence with John Adams, the first US-ambassador in The Hague has already been published in 1853.
- The letters with spicy details, kept in Bytów before World War II, are probably lost. It seems he knew details on the beautiful and spiritual Elisabeth Christine of Brunswick-Lüneburg.
