= Joan Geelvinck =

Joan Geelvinck may refer to:

- Joan Geelvinck (1644–1707), Dutch merchant and politician
- Joan Geelvinck (1737–1802), his great-grandson, mayor of Amsterdam

== See also ==
- Geelvinck
