= Nicolaes Geelvinck =

Nicolaes Geelvinck (11 October 1706, in Amsterdam – 15 June 1764, in Amsterdam) was lord of Castricum, Bakkum, Santpoort, Velsen, Stabroek, schepen, and owner of the country estate Akerendam-by-Beverwijk. He was appointed as mayor of Amsterdam in 1747, but in 1748 lost his seat in the vroedschap and as a counsellor to the Admiralty of Amsterdam, thanks to Mattheus Lestevenon.

== Life ==
In 1729 Nicolaes Geelvinck married Johanna Jacoba Graafland. His father Lieve Geelvinck married Johanna's mother Anna de Haze the year after. Nicolaes worked at the townhall as a lawyer and city secretary. In 1737 he became administrator WIC, a position held for life. When his wife died in 1740, Nicolaes remarried in 1743 to Hester Hooft, at that time held to be the most beautiful woman in Amsterdam, who died two months later of a spleen disease. His childless sister and a widow perhaps took her place as mother, for Nicolaes had five children to bring up. In 1747 Nicolaes Geelvinck married for the third time, to the only daughter of mayor Gerrit Corver. She brought a million guilders with her and on the death of her father she inherited another 1.1 million. Nicolaes had other reasons to be happy, for - not yet forty - he had just become mayor, and was expected to make reforms to the Admiralty.

=== The "Pachtersoproer" ===
On 9 November 1747, during the Taxleasers uproar, Nicolaes Geelvinck - the only burgomaster present - quickly had to flee the city hall on Dam Square, before the mayors room was occupied by the people and a ceiling mob was stuck from the window to make clear, the place was cleaned. The people regarded the leaseholders as responsible, and the regenten's oligarchy as the cause of their misery. The Amsterdam mayors suffered from much criticism, though there were promises that the leasing system would be revised.

Nicolaes' problems did not end there. The result of the tax leaseholders uproar was the Doelistenbeweging, a group of mainly Calvinist merchants, trying to put limits on the powers of the mayors and the Jewish streetvendors. The system of leasing of taxes was quickly lifted. A recently introduced income tax unique in Europe, also aroused resistance, although it affected only the richest (5%) of the population. This tax was replaced by a gift, as often occurred in difficult years with wars. The Austrian Succession had caused a costly war with France. In 1749 Nicolaes inherited 90,000 guilder from his great-aunt Sara Hinlopen: shares, bonds and farmland in one of the oldest polders, the Zijpe.

=== Akerendam ===
Nicolaes Geelvinck lived in the most expensive mansion in Amsterdam, seven windows wide. In 1742, he had bought the Akerendam in Beverwijk from his sister Anna Elisabeth. In 1760, he sold the estate, with stabling for 21 horses, a menagerie, an orangery, eleven hectares of countryside and a number of paintings, when his wife inherited an estate near Velsen, formerly belonging to his father-in-law Gerrit Corver. By the time of his death, Nicolaes Geelvinck was worth six million and the inventory of his belongings took up 66 pages. His widow demanded that until her death she could continue living in the mansion on Herengracht; his nine children got 800,000 guilder each.

After her death the mansion came into the hands of her son Nicolaas Geelvinck (1732–1787), the new administrator of the WIC. The mansion was sold in 1782 to John Hope, son of Thomas Hope, a banker and art collector. (The canalside mansion on Herengracht 509-511 was demolished in 1917 due to the widening of the Vijzelstraat; parts of the interior were moved to Amstel 218). In July 1787 Joan Geelvinck, his brother and a patriot, was elected as mayor of Amsterdam. He had to flee half a few months later to France.

== Bibliography ==
- This article is based entirely or partially on its equivalent on Dutch Wikipedia.
- Broersen, E. (1992) Akerendam, een buitenplaats in Beverwijk.
- Evenhuis, R.B. (1974) Ook dat was Amsterdam. Deel IV.
