= Ahasuerus and Haman at the Feast of Esther =

1660 painting by Rembrandt

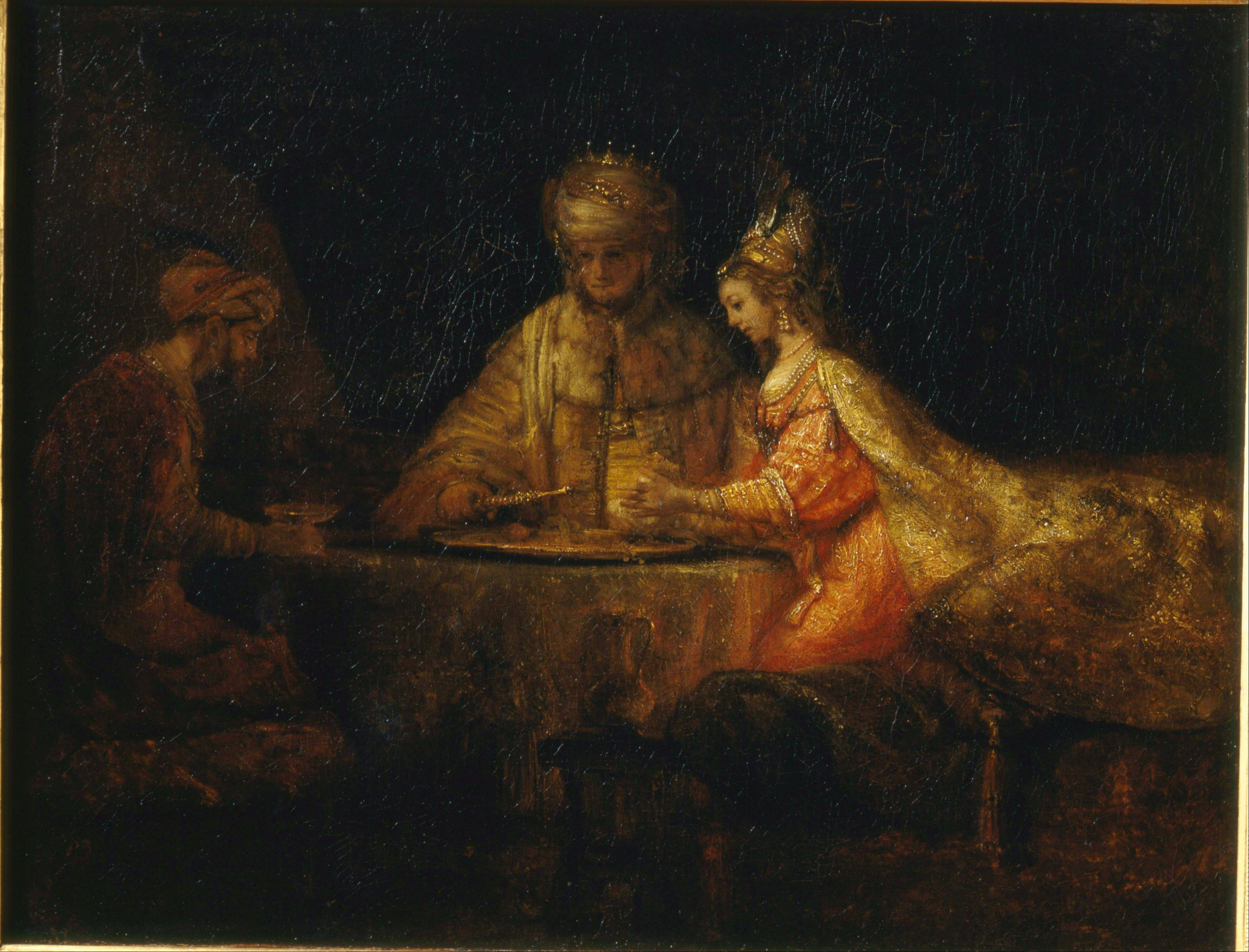
- Artist: Rembrandt
- Year: 1660
- Dimensions: 73 cm × 94 cm (29 in × 37 in)
- Location: Pushkin Museum, Moscow

The painting Ahasveros and Haman at the Feast of Esther is one of the few works of Rembrandt van Rijn whose complete provenance is known. The origin of the painting can be traced back to 1662, two years after its completion.

There are only three figures in the picture and the banquet is suggested sketchily. Esther lowers her arms apprehensively as she finishes her speech, the king's lips are pursed in anger, and Haman's pose reveals a sense of doom. The distance between the king and his vizier seems enormous, while the king and queen form a united pair.

== Subject ==
The subject is an episode from chapters 5–7 of the Book of Esther in the Old Testament. Haman, councillor to the king Ahasuerus, proposed to hang Mordechai for not paying him respect by standing as he entered the room or by greeting him, and the entire Jewish nation as revenge for their pride. The Jews were saved by the intercession of Mordechai's cousin Esther, who was also Ahasuerus' wife. It is this rescue that is still celebrated in the Jewish festival of Purim. In that festival, Haman is portrayed as the villain, and this is reflected in Rembrandt's depiction of him.

According to the Pushkin Museum this is one of the best creations of Rembrandt's late period.

The dramatic conflict between the three persons is expressed through their restrained but eloquent gestures. The scene has a tense atmosphere of suspense. The figure of Esther is radiant, her robe with a long train is gleaming as if with precious stones. Haman is immersed in the shadows. Rembrandt achieves great depth in rendering the inner life, the spiritual energy of his characters.

== Rembrandt ==
Rembrandt was inspired by the play Hester, by Johannes Serwouters (1623-1677), when painting Ahasuerus and Haman at the Feast of Esther. The play was first performed in 1659 in the Schouwburg of Van Campen and dedicated to Leonore Huydecoper, the daughter of Joan Huydecoper van Maarsseveen. Serwouters wrote his play as a reaction to the pogroms in Eastern Europe. Her husband may have ordered the painting, in this way helping Rembrandt being in financial difficulties.

After its completion in 1660, Rembrandt sold the painting Ahasuerus and Haman at the Feast of Esther to Jan J. Hinlopen. In the year 1662 a poetry book by Jan Vos was published, in which there were a number of poems based on the paintings belonging to Jan J. Hinlopen. Jan Vos describes the painting as following:

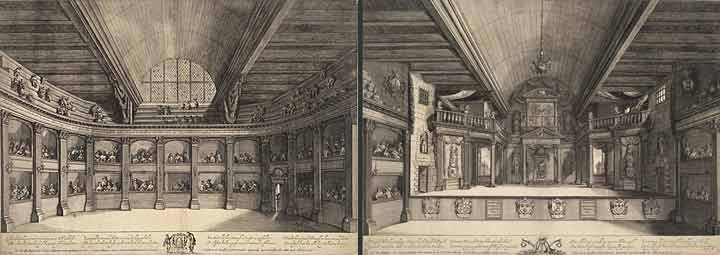
Engravure of the Playhouse Van Campen in 1658 by Salomon Savery

"Here one sees Haman eating with Ahasuerus and Esther.
"But it is in vain; his breast is full of regret and pain.
"He eats Esther's food; but deeper into her heart.
"The king is mad with revenge and rage.
"The wrath of a monarch..."

== Provenance ==
Part of Jan Hinlopen's collection passed to his two daughters, this painting was one of them. Sara Hinlopen, the longest living of her family, died 89 years old, but without children. Most of her belongings passed to Nicolaes Geelvinck and his three sisters. Unfortunately, her will does not mention any painting, most probably to avoid inheritance taxes.

In 1760 Ahasuerus and Haman at the Feast of Esther was sold as number 45 at an auction, listed as coming from Nicolaes Geelvinck, and organized after the death of Gerard Hoet, a minor painter but important collector in The Hague.

In 1764 the painting came to Catherine the Great, most probably through the German entrepreneur Johann Ernst Gotzkowsky, in financial trouble after the Seven Years' War. After receiving 320 paintings at one time from Gotzkowsky, the Russian Tsarina started the Hermitage.

Probably advised by Gustav Friedrich Waagen the painting went in 1862 to the Museum Rumyantsev in Moscow. Since 1924 Ahasuerus and Haman at the Feast of Esther can be seen in the Pushkin Museum, also in Moscow.

== See also ==
- List of paintings by Rembrandt
