= Joan Geelvinck (1644–1707) =

Dutch merchant and politician

Amsterdam Heritage: Singel 460

Joan Geelvinck (7 July 1644 – 21 May 1707) was a Dutch merchant and politician who followed his father Cornelis and younger brother Albert on the city council of Amsterdam.

== Career ==
In 1663 he became an ensign, in 1666 lieutenant, in 1676 captain and in 1688 colonel in the civic guard.

In 1688 Joan Geelvinck became one of the 17 administrators of the Dutch East India Company. He served for more than one term. In 1696 an expedition of three ships, Geelvink, Nijptangh and Weseltje, under the command of Willem de Vlamingh and Captains Gerrit Collaert and Cornelis de Vlamingh was dispatched to look for Ridderschap van Holland and explore New Holland. The fleet explored Rottnest Island, the mainland around the Swan River (present site of Perth) and several points along the coast going north. They landed on Dirk Hartog Island, where de Vlamingh retrieved Hartogh's pewter plate which he had left behind, before heading for Batavia.

The Geelvink returned to Holland with a cargo of textiles, saltpetre, opium, silk from Bengal and Persia, indigo, cloves and pepper.

== Personal life ==
Geelvinck was born in Amsterdam. In 1674 he married his full cousin Anna van Loon and became the father of the twins Lieve Geelvinck, later a mayor, and his sister Catharina Clara who married Willem Boreel, becoming ambassador in Paris.

Joan Geelvinck lived at Singel 460, designed by Philip Vingboons. The huge building, also used as his warehouse is nowadays better known as Odeon, a discothèque, with an interesting interior; in the 19th century it was a music hall where Brahms and Chopin played.

Geelvinck died, aged 62, at The Hague.
