= Pieter de Ring =

Dutch Golden Age painter

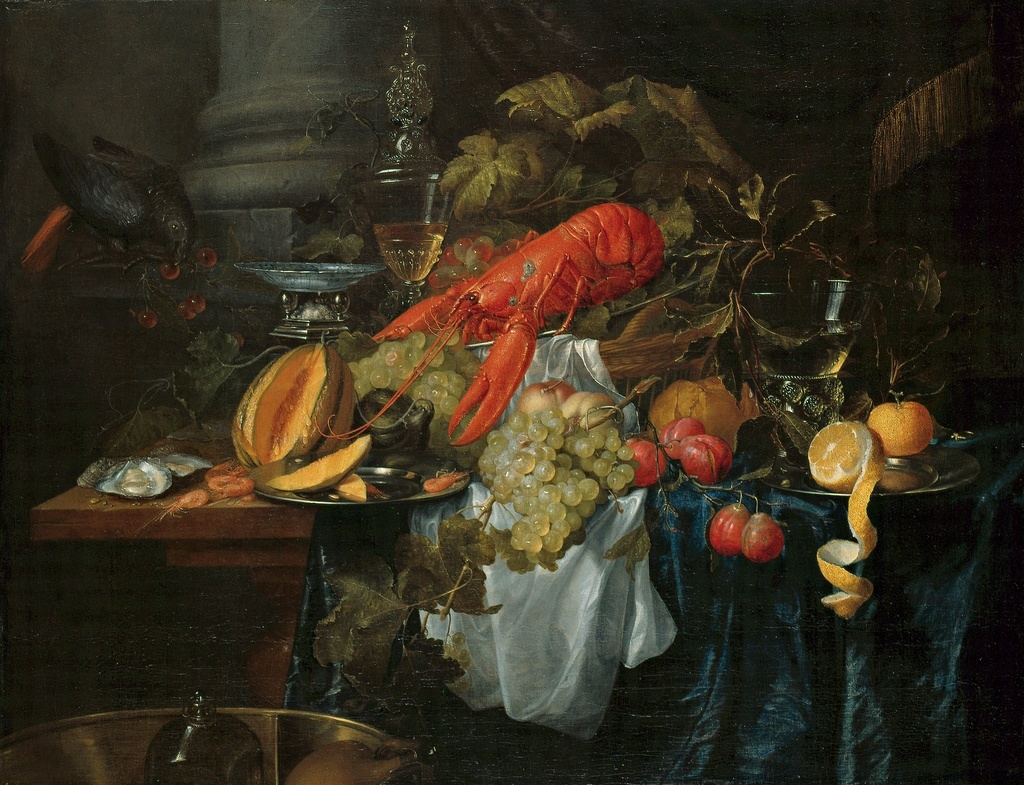
Still Life with a Golden Goblet - c. 1650.

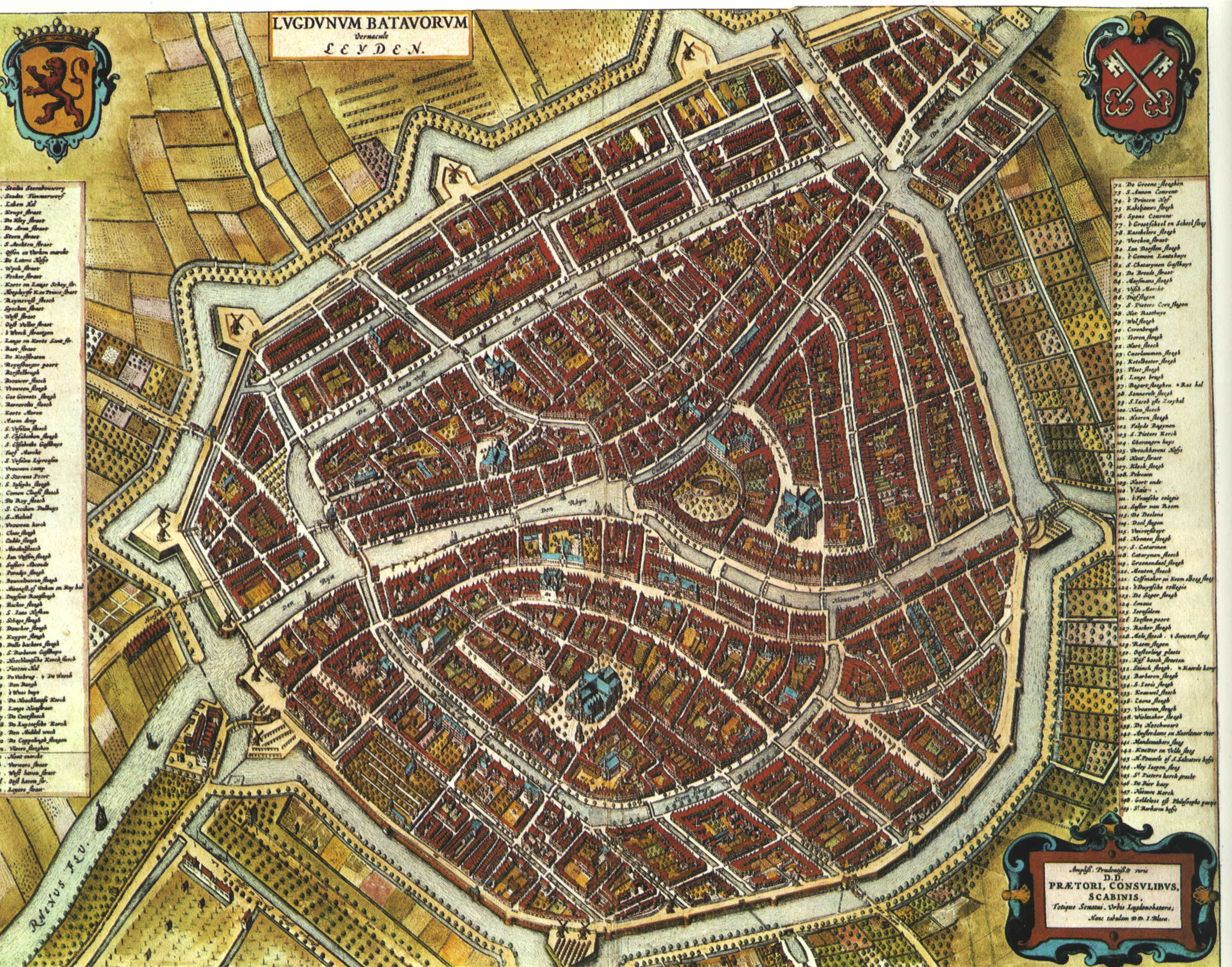
Map of Leiden by Blaeu in 1652

Pieter de Ring, or Ryng (1615/1620 – 22 September 1660) was a Dutch Golden Age painter, famous for his opulent, flashy still lifes or banquet pieces with fruit, a lobster, a goblet, shrimps, oysters, a rug and Chinese porcelain. His signature is often a painted ring or with the Latinised form of his name, P.Ab.Annulo.

== Biography ==
De Ring was born either in Leiden, or in Ypres in Flanders, but there is no trace of his birth in the Leiden archives, and the Ypres Archives were destroyed in August 1914. Pieter de Ring started as a mason and painted still lifes in the evening. When the hall was filled with paintings he became a pupil of Jan Davidsz. de Heem, until 1635 living in Leiden. His father Daniel died in 1648; in 1657 his mother lived in Amsterdam. De Ring himself lived in a house at Hogewoerd.

There are no records in the Leiden Archive on his marriage or children. He appears not to have bought a house there nor wrote a will. What is known is that he became one of the founders a member and of the Guild of St. Luke in 1648, De Ring died in Leiden and was buried in the Pieterskerk, Leiden on 22 September 1660 and taken to church from a house in the Nonnensteeg. If he had his studio there he probably had a view on the Leiden Academy building. If he lived on the east side of the alley he had a beautiful view on the Hortus Botanicus of Leiden, the work of Clusius.

Pieter may have had a brother called Jan de Ringh, who became a citizen of Leiden in 1651. Jan originally came from Ypres, his profession was textile worker, just like his sons Daniel, Benjamin, and Pieter and many of the other Flemish immigrants in Leiden. The members of the Ringh family were specialized workers in serge, camlet or cloth.

The painting by Pieter de Ring in the Museum Geelvinck-Hinlopen Huis has a beautiful cloth on the table. He knew how to make it look real. De Ring's early work reveals the influence of Willem Claesz Heda.
