= Simon Fokke =

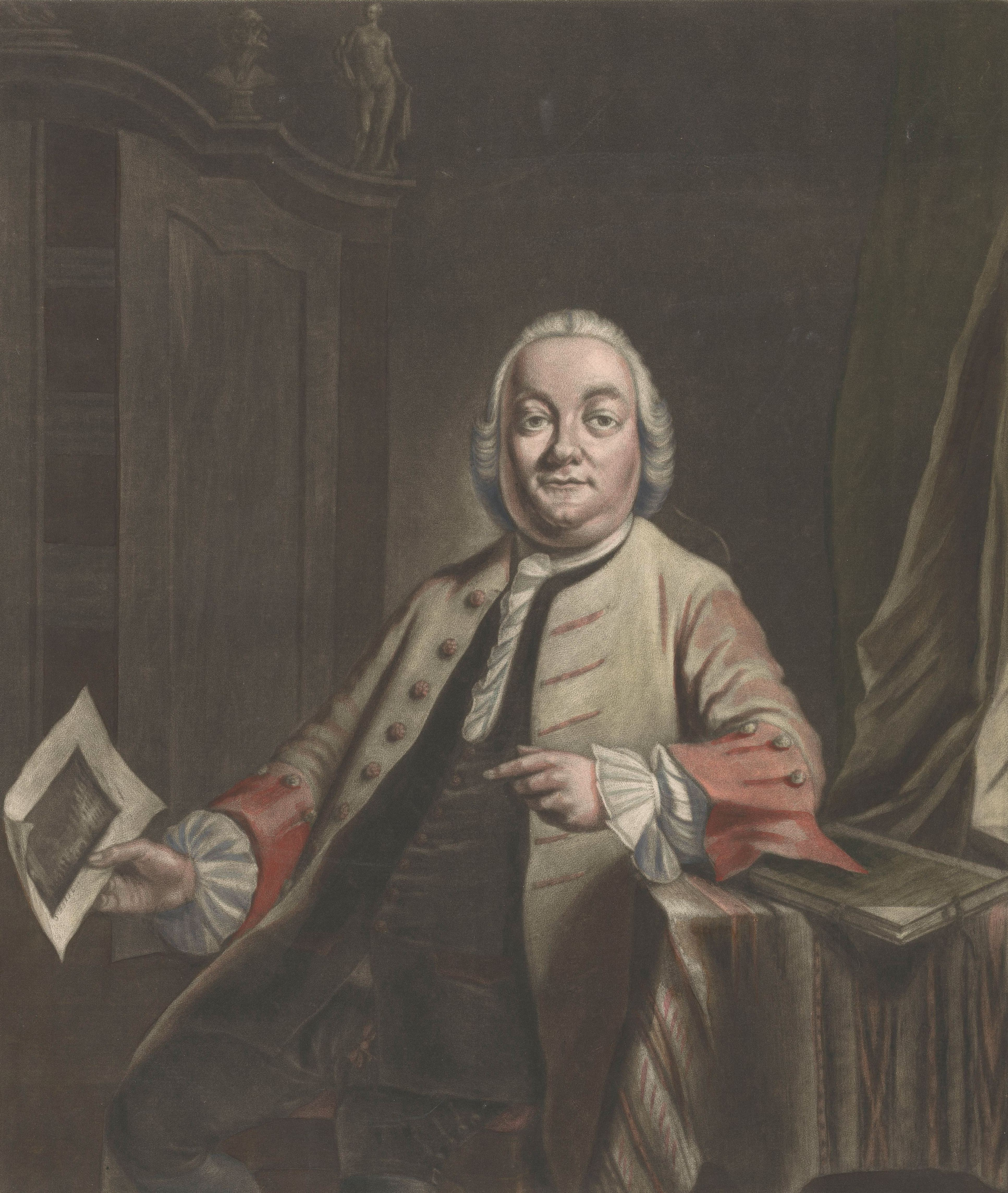
Simon Fokke holding one of his engravings, (by John Greenwood after a portrait by Jacobus Buys)

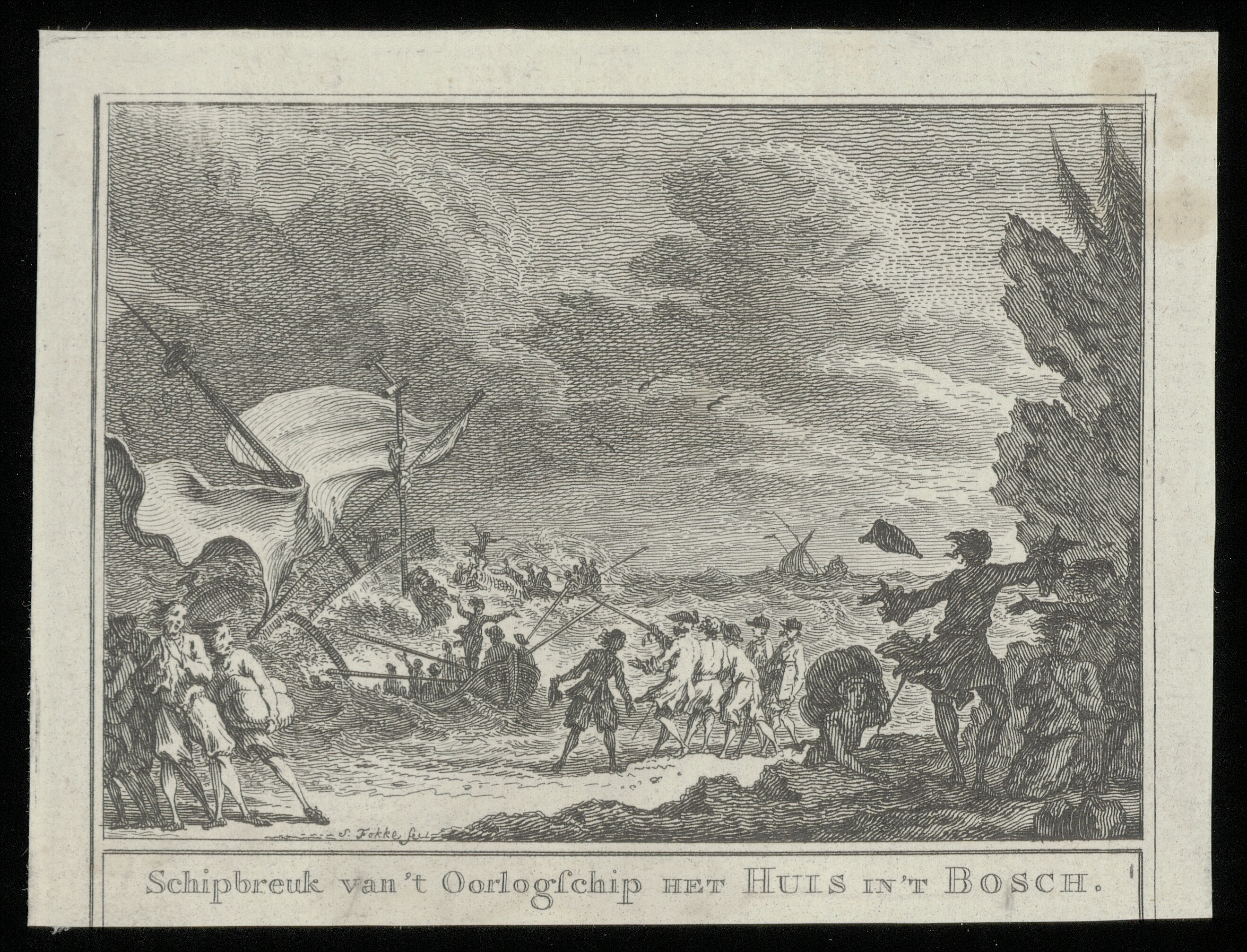
Engraving made by Simon Fokke: The Shipwreck.

Simon Fokke (1712–1784) was a Dutch designer, etcher, and engraver. Born in Amsterdam, he was a pupil of J. C. Philips, and was chiefly employed by booksellers to engrave small portraits and vignettes. He died in Amsterdam in 1784. His works include:

- His own Portrait; after himself.
- A View of the Port of Leghorn; after Vernet.
- A View near Narni, in Lombardy; after the same.
- Six plates of Dutch Views, with Rivers, Ships, and Skaters; after Avercamp.
- Several Portraits for Tycho Hofman's Portraits historiques des hommes illustres de Dannemark, 1741.
- Several plates of his own design for Wagenaar's Vaderlandsche Historie, 1749–59.
- The Treaty of Peace at Münster; after Terborch.
- The Prodigal Son; after Spagnoletto; in the Dresden Gallery.
- Jacob keeping the Flocks of Laban; after the same; in the Dresden Gallery.
- The Death of Dido, a burlesque; after C. Troost.
- Vignette of Liberty on the title page of Rousseau's Discourse on Inequality, 1755.
