= Cornelis Geelvinck =

Dutch mayor

Cornelis Geelvinck (15 November 1621, Amsterdam – 16 December 1689, Amsterdam) was important in the city administration of Amsterdam that arose after stadholder William III came to power in 1672, both as administrator, and as mayor in the years 1673, 1675, 1684, 1688 and 1689.

== Biography ==
Cornelis Geelvinck was the grandson of a peas and beans merchant who supplied the Dutch East India Company (VOC) and Dutch West India Company (WIC). Cornelis Geelvinck was the son of Jan Cornelisz. Geelvinck and Aechje (Agatha) de Vlaming of Oudshoorn. He married a granddaughter of mayor Albert Burgh, Elisabeth Velecker (1622–1658) in 1643, with whom he had six children: Joan (1644), Albert (1647), Cornelis (1649), Brechje or Brigitta (1651), Coenraad and Dirck (1656). In 1662, he married Margaretha Bicker van Swieten (1619–1697), the heiress of the country house "Akerendam", daughter of former burgomaster Cornelis Bicker van Swieten. Through his marriage he became a brother-in-law to Andries de Graeff and Lambert Reynst, burgomasters of Amsterdam and also to Gerard Bicker (I) van Swieten.

In 1664, Cornelis Geelvinck bought the fiefdoms of Castricum and Croonenburg for 33,000 and 25,000 guilder respectively, which brought him earnings and the right to make appointments. In August 1666 the Amsterdam government sent him as "vigilant gentleman" to Den Helder, where an English raid was feared. In November 1672 the States of Holland ordered him to carry away the hay and peat from Uithoorn and the surrounding towns, so that they would not fall into the hands of the French army that had occupied Utrecht.

In 1684 Geelvinck had to receive stadholder William III of Orange in the townhall, but the prince refused to stop his horse and passed the town hall at a gallop. Geelvinck did not support the prince, when he was planning an invasion in 1688 of England. Nicolaes Witsen and Johannes Hudde switched. In 1690 the recommendations for new burgomasters were not sent directly to the prince, but to the States-General. Geelvinck finally lost credit among his colleagues.

After his death Geelvinck was followed into the vroedschap by his sons Albert (see Museum Geelvinck-Hinlopen) and Joan.
