= Jan Caspar Philips =

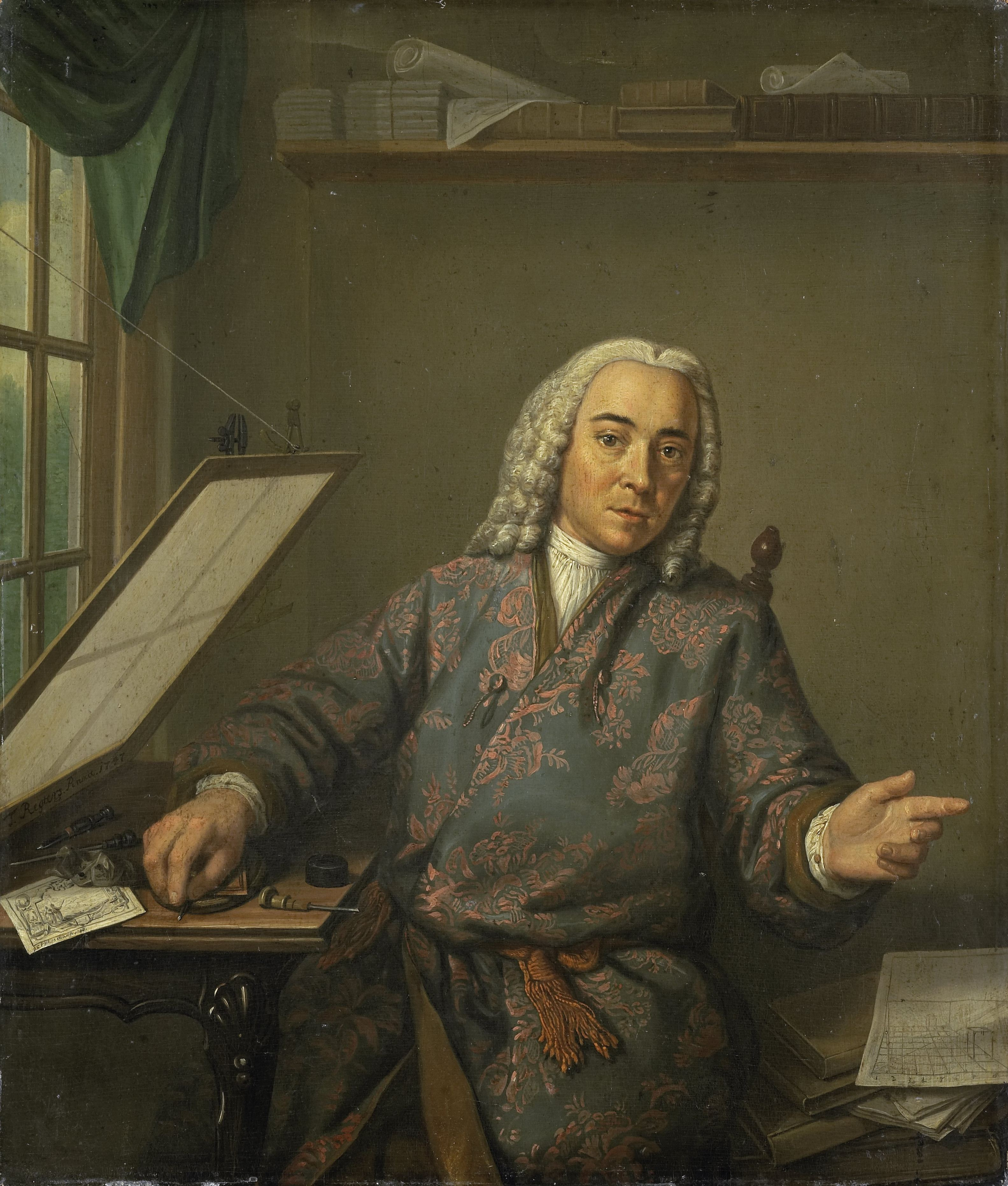
1747 painting of Jan Caspar Philips by Tibout Regters

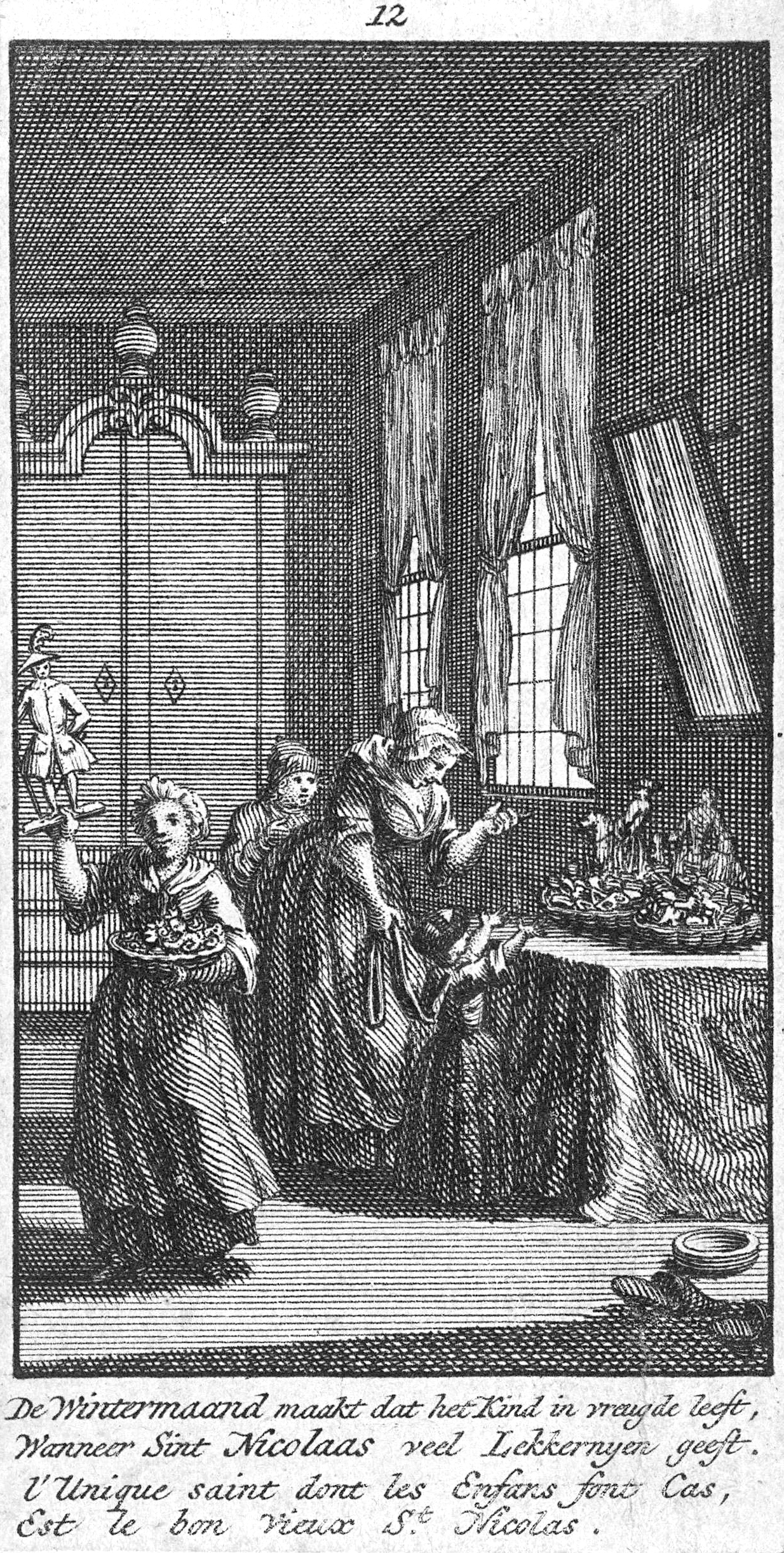
A family celebrating Sinterklaasavond on 5 December, by Jan Caspar Philips

Jan Caspar Philips (1690–1775), was a German engraver who settled in Amsterdam.

He was born perhaps in Trebur, like a younger brother. His father was Hendrik Philips (-1748), a wigmaker, his mother Anna Elizabeth Kraft (-1753). The family settled at NZ Voorburgwal. In 1725 he became the teacher of the engraver Simon Fokke and his nephew Caspar Philips. He contributed engravings to Jan Wagenaar's Hedendaagse Historie and made the engravings in 1743 for Kornelis de Wit's Verzaameling van Afbeeldingen van Doopsgezinde Leeraaren. He died at Egelantiersgracht.
