= Coymanshuis =

Canal house in Amsterdam, Netherlands

Coordinates: 52°22′28.12″N 4°53′8.53″E

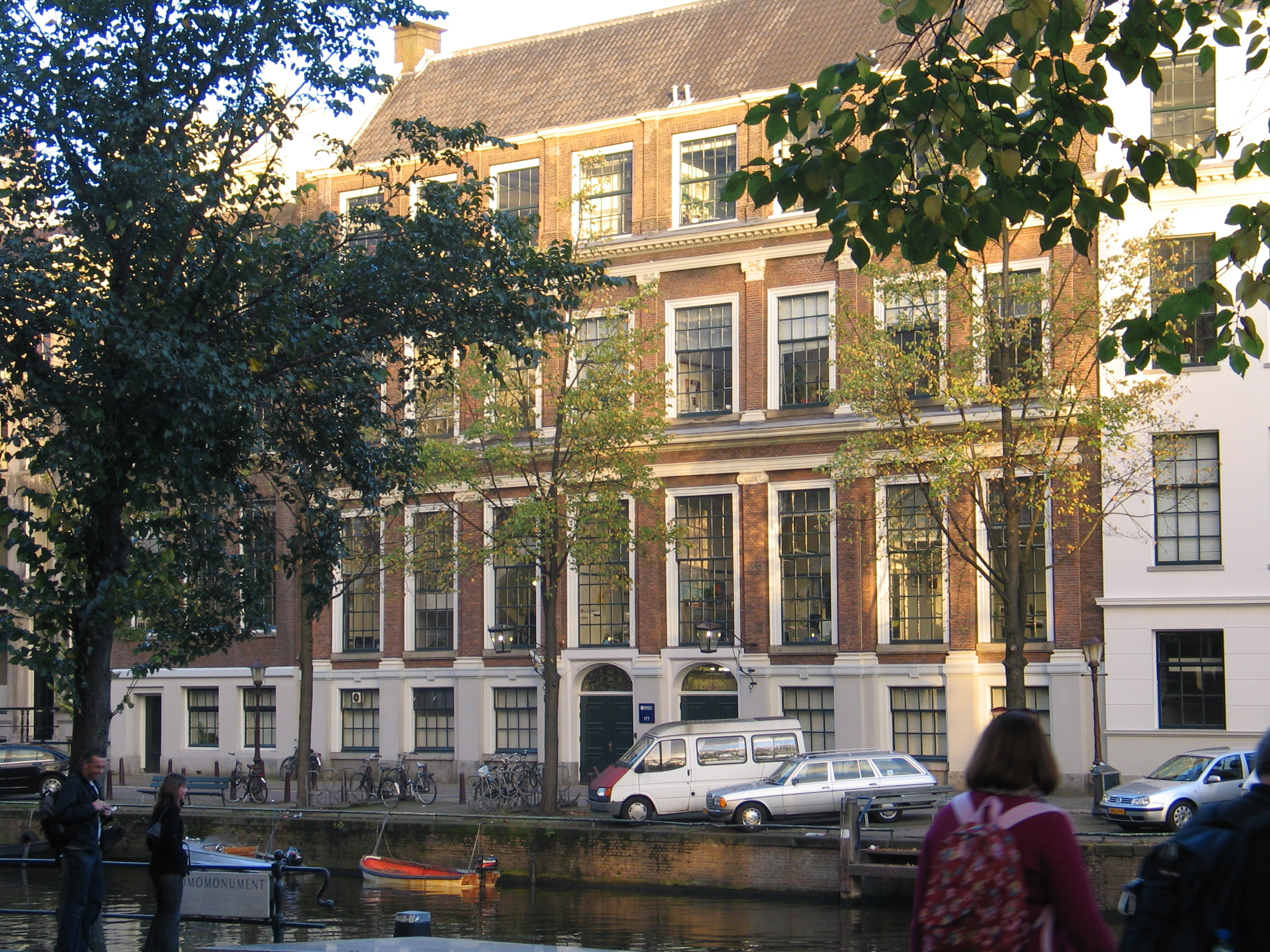
Coymanshuis on the Keizersgracht

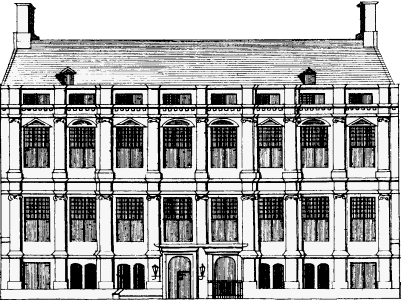
Facade of the Coymanshuis in Caspar Phillips' Grachtenboek uit 1771.

The Coymanshuis is a canal house on the Keizersgracht 177, Amsterdam. The double wide house was designed and built in 1625 by Jacob van Campen for two brothers, traders/bankers; one had six the other ten children. Their company delt in silver, iron and tar.

It is Van Campen's first design in Amsterdam and was an important stepping stone to gaining the commission for the Amsterdam City Hall, today the Royal Palace of Amsterdam. He designed it for Balthasar Coymans (1589 - 1657) and his brother Johannes Coymans (1601 - 1657). The house was praised by the writer-architects Cornelis Danckerts de Ry and Salomon de Bray in their book Architectura Moderna in 1631. They claimed that all visitors to the city should see this building if they appreciate architecture.

The house and office was home to various members of the Coymans family until it was inhabited by Jan Pieter Theodoor Huydecoper in 1759. In 1780 it was inhabited by his nephew Jan Elias Huydecoper.

In 1887 it was sold to the city of Amsterdam, serving for a long time as a secondary school. Since 2003 it is an office building, sheltering the Netherlands headquarters of Amnesty International and since 2014 also other, related organizations.
