= Bakkum =

- Village
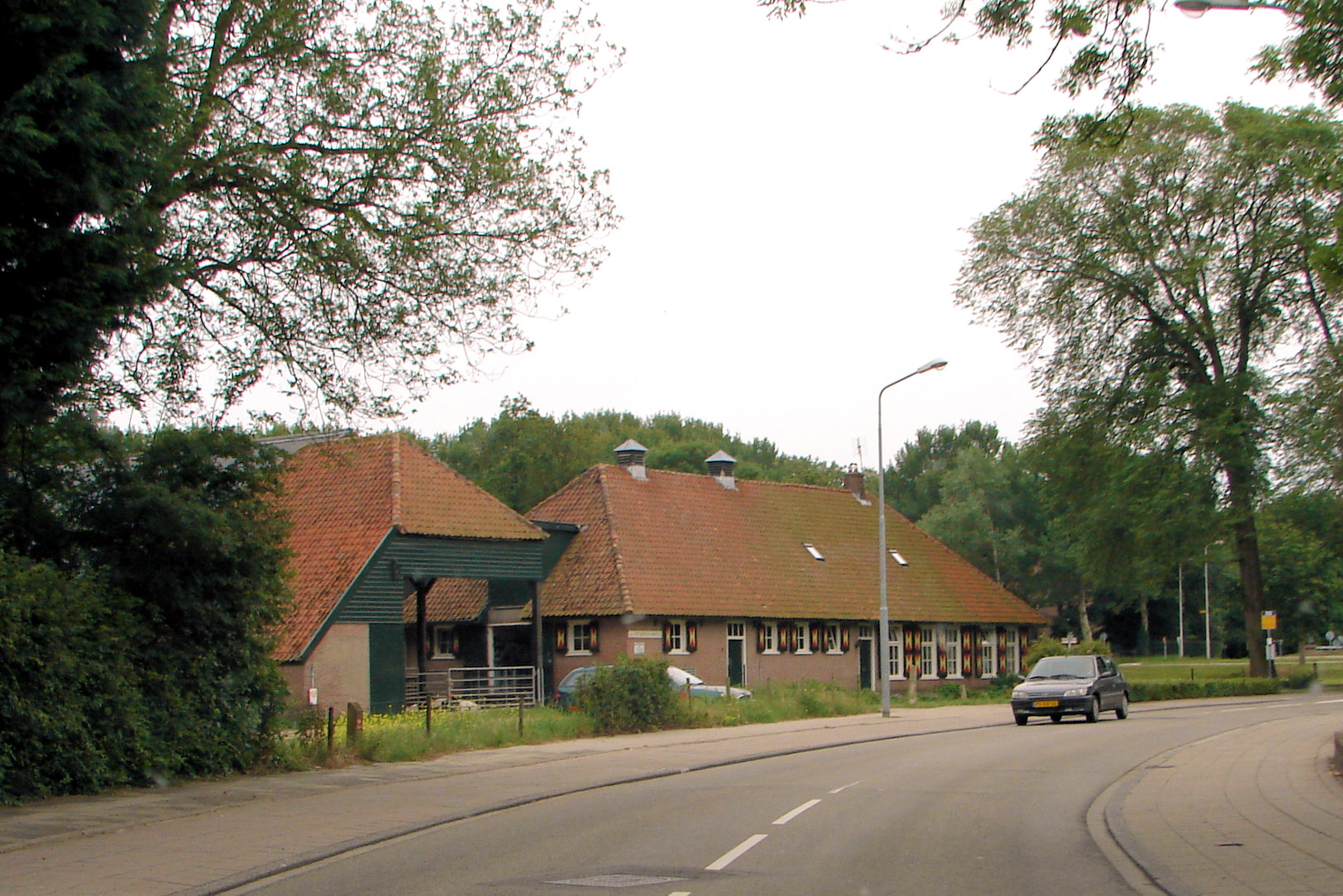

- Location in the Netherlands Location in the province of North Holland in the Netherlands
- Coordinates: 52°34′N 4°39′E
- Country: Netherlands
- Province: North Holland
- Municipality: Castricum

Area
  - Total: 5.00 km^{2} (1.93 sq mi)
- Elevation: 1.3 m (4.3 ft)

Population (2021)
  - Total: 2,585
  - Density: 517/km^{2} (1,340/sq mi)
- Time zone: UTC+1 (CET)
  - Summer (DST): UTC+2 (CEST)
- Postal code: 1901
- Dialing code: 0251

Bakkum is a village in the Dutch province of North Holland. It is a part of the municipality of Castricum and lies about 12 km southwest of Alkmaar. It has three satellites: the village of Bakkum-Noord, the hamlet Noord Bakkum and Bakkum aan Zee which is nowadays called Castricum aan Zee.

The village was first mentioned in the late-11th century as Bachem, and means "settlement on a height". Bakkum used to be a heerlijkheid. In 1749, it was sold to Nicolaas Geelvinck who was Lord of Castricum among others.

In 1812, Bakkum became a part of the municipality of Castricum. Some tourism developed in the early 20th century, but Bakkum never developed into a seaside resort town. After World War II, it started to form a single urban area with Castricum.

== Gallery ==
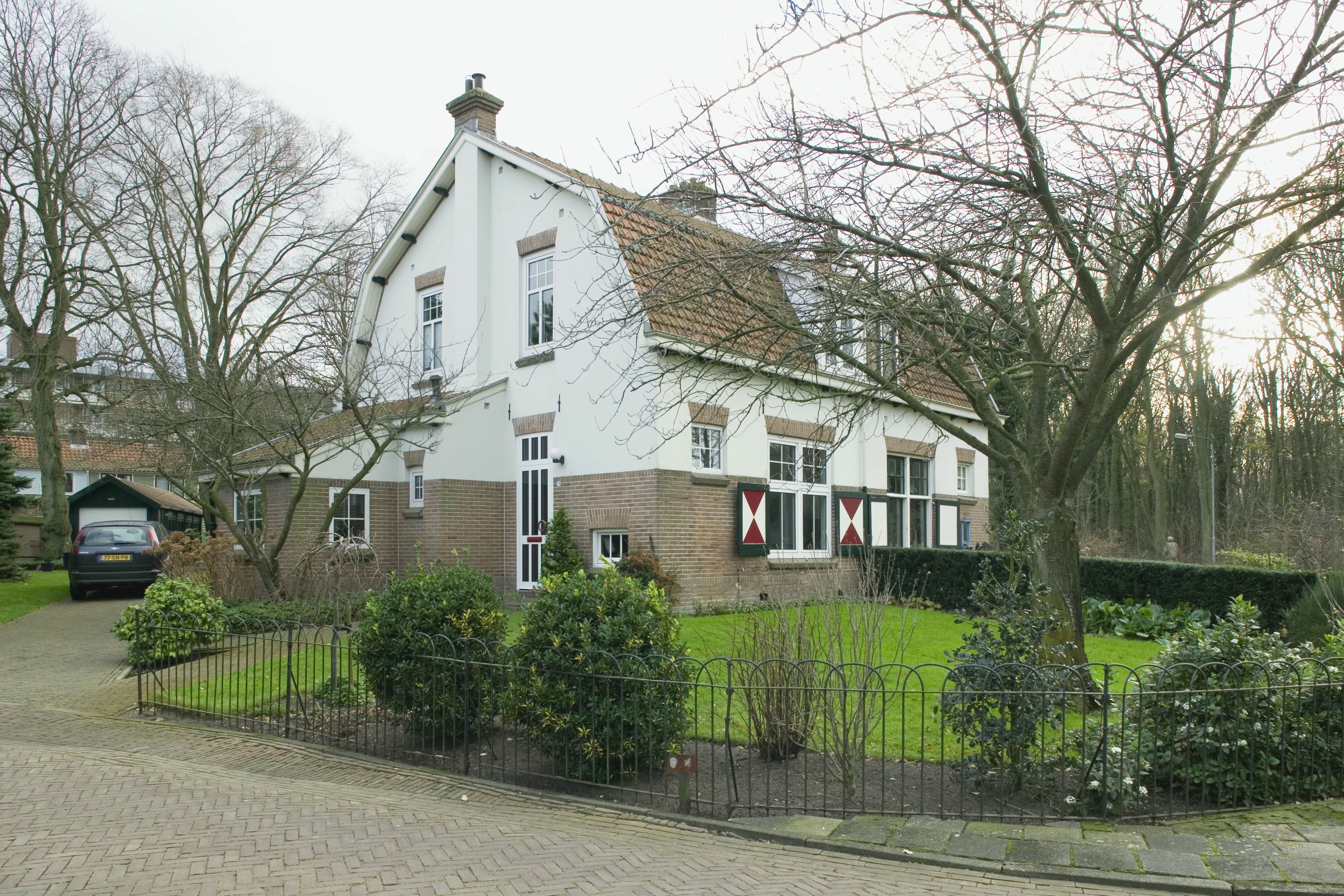
House in Bakkum

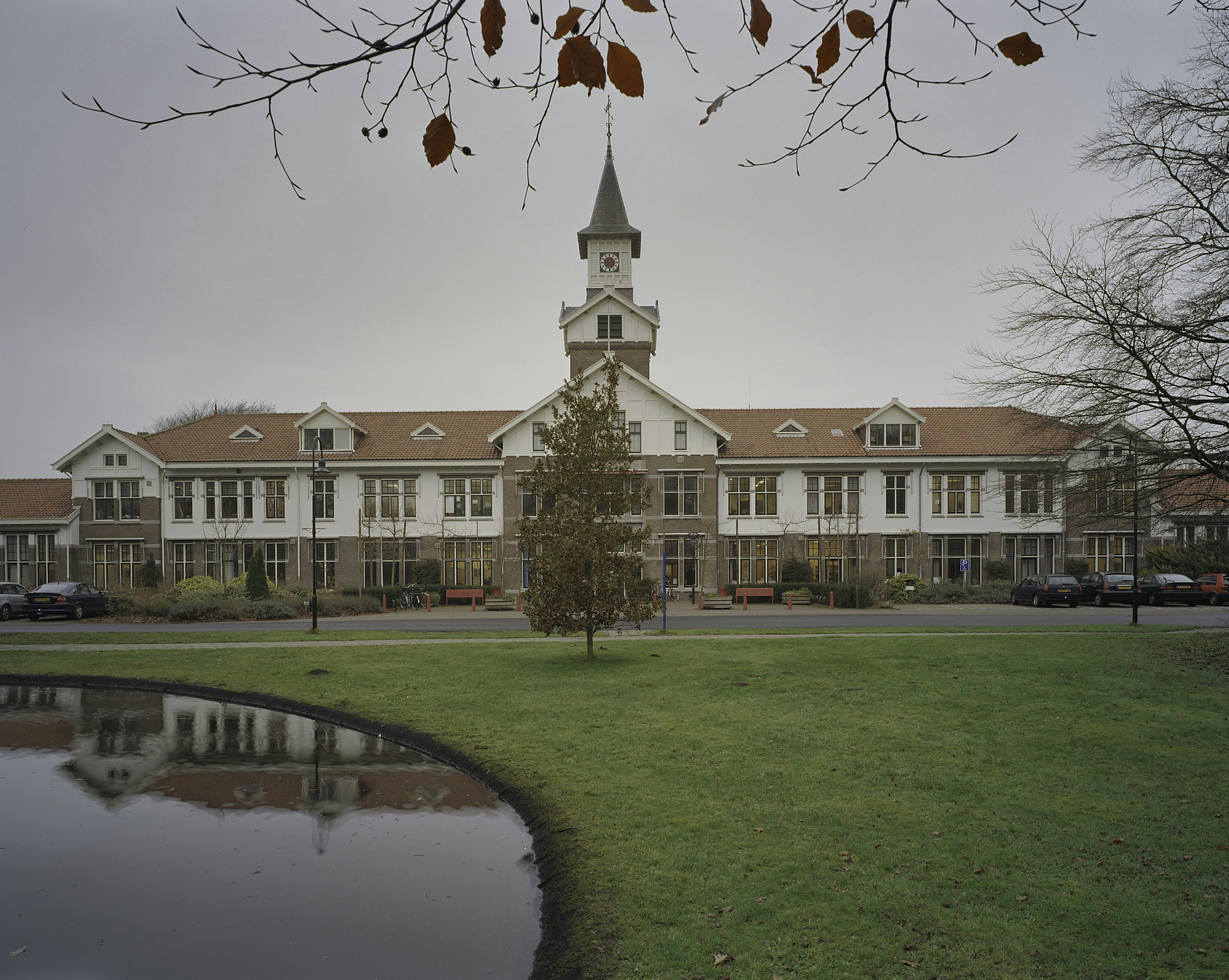
Psychiatric hospital Duin en Bosch

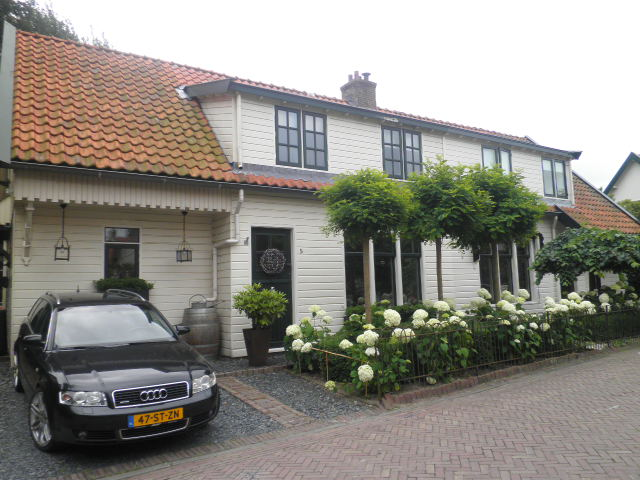
House in Bakkum

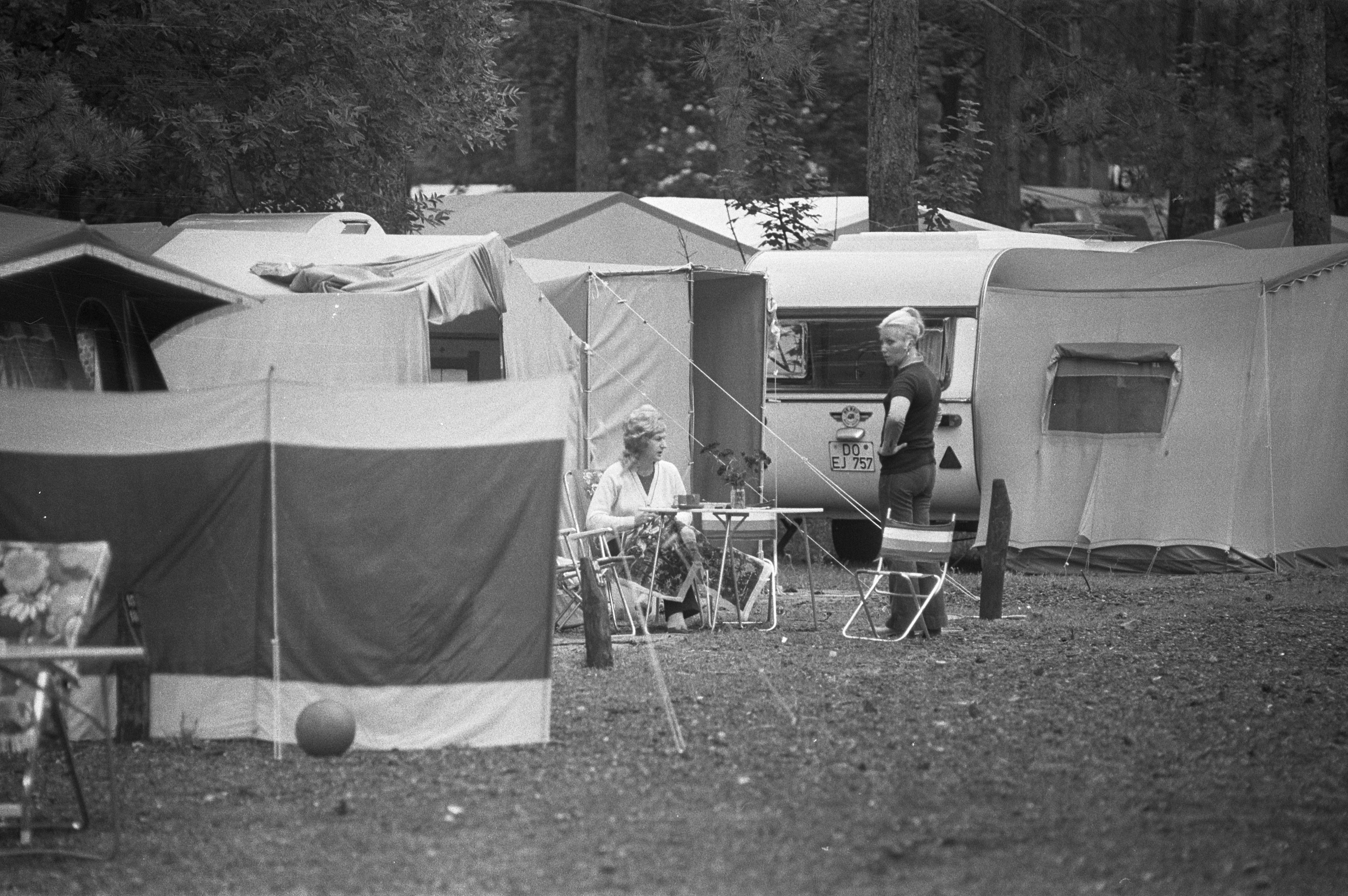
Camp site in Bakkum (1972)
