= Grachtenboek =

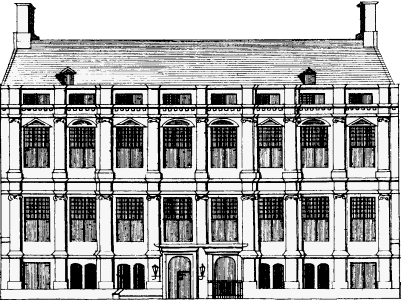
Front of the Coymanshuis, the first house designed by Jacob van Campen in 1625. Drawing by Caspar Philips for his Grachtenboek, 1771.

The Grachtenboek (Canal Book) is a book of engraved plates with architecturally correct renditions of housefronts on the canals of Amsterdam, most notably the Herengracht (Gentlemen's canal) and Keizersgracht (Emperor's canal). It was an invention of Caspar Philips that was published in installments between 1768 and 1771 with 1400 engravings based on his and others' drawings.

On the basis of these scale drawings, the 18th century state of the facades along the Herengracht and Keizersgracht can be seen. There have been numerous reprints by city publishers as well as commercial companies.

The book was originally intended as a guide for carpenters, masons, stonemasons, painters and blacksmiths. The book is especially known today for the role it has played in the 20th-century reconstruction and restoration of Amsterdam canal houses by the historic preservation committee, Stadsherstel Amsterdam.
