= Joan Geelvinck (1737–1802) =

Dutch mayor

Joan Geelvinck (August 7, 1737 – July 2, 1802) was a mayor of Amsterdam for scarcely six months in 1787. He came to office after two Orangist mayors were ejected in a radical way. Hendrik Daniëlsz Hooft, the father of Joan's brother-in-law, was the leader of the Amsterdam Patriots in the vroedschap. Geelvinck was the son of Nicolaas Geelvinck and the grandson of Lieve Geelvinck, both mayors of Amsterdam. In 1780 his brother Nicolaas became representative of the stadtholder in the West India Company. His sister was Agatha Theodora Geelvinck.

== Biography ==
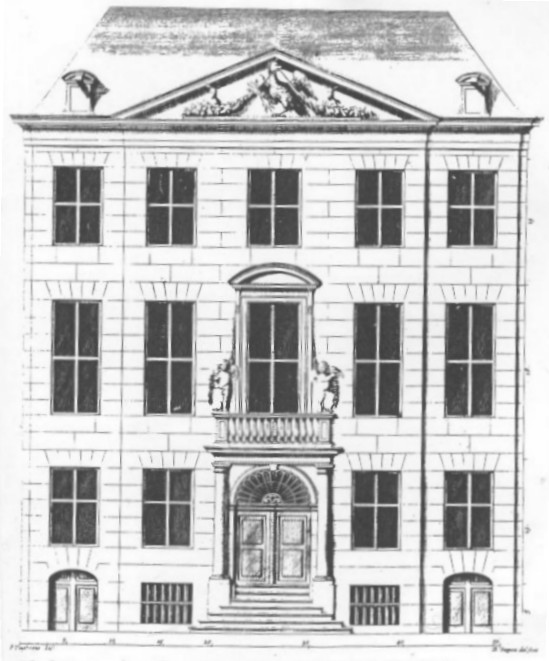
Building Herengracht 466, also known as "the corner house" designed by Philips Vingboons in 1672 in which Geelvinck lived.

After graduating in law from Leiden University, Geelvinck was appointed to the city council of Amsterdam in 1759. He married Maria Elisabeth Beck in 1760. He resided in the Herengracht 456 building until 1762 when he inherited the Herengracht 466 building from Anna de Haze who was one of the richest women in Amsterdam. In 1765 he had it renovated, after his neighbor had taken out insurance on his transoms, because of the possible damage caused by piles and beams. In 1767 he lent Henry Hope 36,000 guilders. In 1768 he became bailiff and dijkgraaf of Amstelland, bailiff of Waver, Botshol and Ruige Wilnis. From 1769 to 1773 he worked as an ambassador in Brussels. On November 29, 1769, he had the house in the Gouden Bocht on the Herengracht publicly auctioned. The building was sold for 250,000 guilders. Parts of the interior, including the wallpapers created by the Haarlem painter Jan Augustini can be seen in the De Bazel building, in the City Archives. Between 1774 and 1787, Geelvinck worked as the dijkgraaf of Zeeburg and Diemerzeedijk.

On 16 November 1783, Geelvinck held discussions with FS Grave van Byland, who had proposed a one-man administration of Amsterdam. In 1784, he married Margaretha van Loon. In the meantime Geelvinck lived in Herengracht 466, also known as "the corner house".

On 5 July 1787, the college of the constituted deposed the mayors Dedel and Beels. On 7 July 1787, Geelvinck was appointed the mayor of the city, when the patriots introduced more democratic principles, that is to say an appointment without approval or nomination by the stateholder. Thousands of people had gone to the Dam to await the result.

After Amsterdam had been surrounded by Prussian troops in September 1787, Geelvinck was part of a committee meeting from September 29, aiming to offer satisfaction to Princess Wilhelmina of Prussia. However, the princess was not satisfied with the mission and demanded that the government would be deposed and the citizens disarmed. The next day the armistice was lifted and the city was attacked. Under the pressure of circumstances, mayors Geelvinck and Backer resigned. On 10 October the city's capitulation was signed. Very soon hundreds of people fled to the French Consulate to apply for a passport. After the citizens had been disarmed, the Duke of Brunswick and his troops left for Wesel on 15 November. Two weeks later the law was repealed. Joan Geelvinck, Hendrik Daniëlsz Hooft the leader of the Amsterdam patriots, and the father of his brother-in-law, as well as the deputy sheriff Joan Cornelis van der Hoop resigned and moved to Brussels. Geelvinck resided in Brussels for some time and lived with Jan Bernd Bicker in a large rented building, which had been vacated by Mattheus Lestevenon.

In 1790, Geelvinck was part of a committee aiming to promote patriot interests and benefits in Paris. He lived in the same street as Jacques Necker and the Count de Mirabeau. Geelvinck moved temporarily to Versailles until the court was moved to Paris, and there he was part of a club of moderate revolutionaries around the Marquis de La Fayette.

After 1795 Geelvinck became a member of the Assembly of Provisional Representatives of the People of Holland from 26 January 1795 to March 1796. He subsequently became a member of the National Assembly of the Batavian Republic. His daughter Johanna Albertina Geelvinck (1762-1815) became dame du Palais to Queen Hortense de Beauharnais in 1806. Maria Petronella (1769-1831) moved to Bern, when she married the Swiss military man Franz Anton Tschiffely.
