= Caspar Jacobsz Philips =

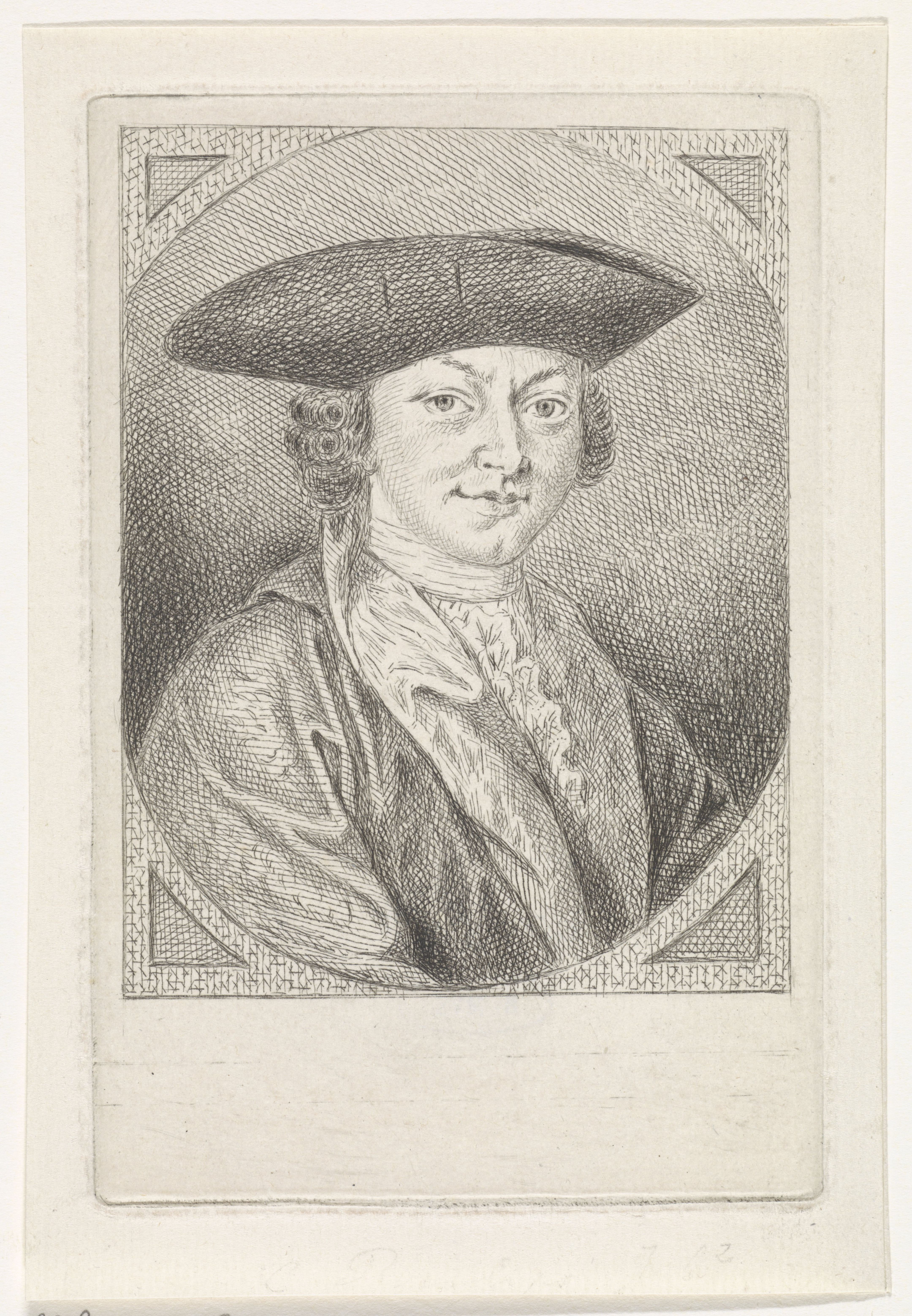
Etching of Caspar Jacobsz Philips

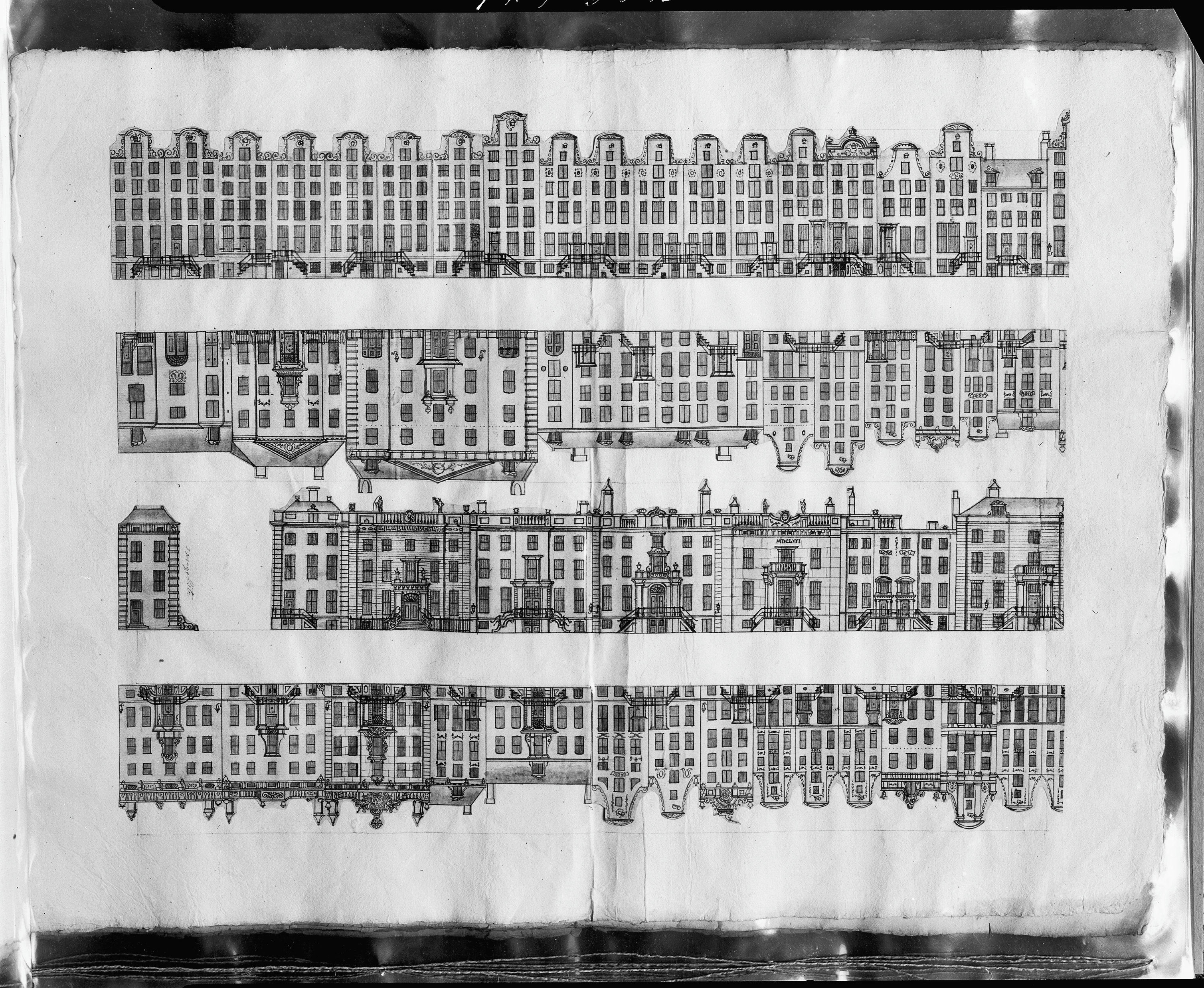
Facades in the Grachtenboek

Caspar Jacobsz Philips (1732 – 1789), was an 18th-century engraver and architectural historian of the Dutch Republic.

== Biography ==
He was the son of Johan Jacob Philips who married to Rebecca Sieverts in 1730. He was baptized in the Lutheran church in Amsterdam and became the pupil of his uncle, Jan Caspar Philips. He was married twice and had three daughters, baptized at home, from his first marriage. He is most known for his drawings of Amsterdam buildings in his Grachtenboek, but there are serious doubts about his involvement. He also wrote a book on perspective. He died in Amsterdam, living at Brouwersgracht.
