= Stabroek =

- Municipality
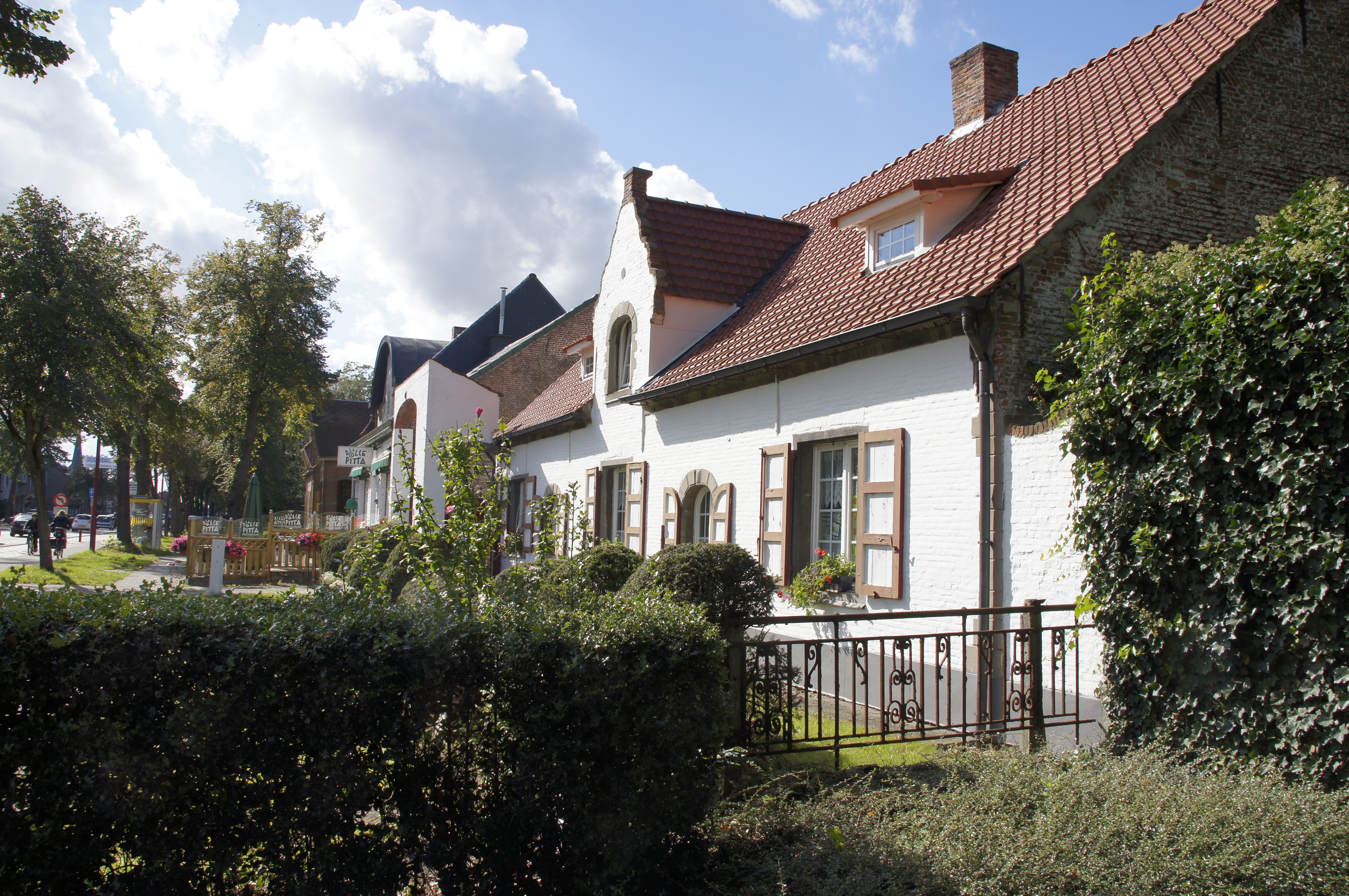

- Flag Coat of arms

- Location of Stabroek in the province of Antwerp
- Interactive map of Stabroek
- Location in Belgium
- Coordinates: 51°20′N 04°22′E
- Country: Belgium
- Community: Flemish Community
- Region: Flemish Region
- Province: Antwerp
- Arrondissement: Antwerp

Government
  - Mayor: Herman Jongenele (STERK2940)

Area
  - Total: 21.42 km^{2} (8.27 sq mi)

Population (2018-01-01)
  - Total: 18,529
  - Density: 865.0/km^{2} (2,240/sq mi)
- Postal codes: 2940
- NIS code: 11044
- Area codes: 03
- Website: www.stabroek.be

Stabroek (Dutch pronunciation: [ˈstaːbruk]) is a municipality located in the Belgian province of Antwerp. The municipality comprises the towns of Hoevenen and Stabroek proper. In 2021, Stabroek had a total population of 18,680. The total area is 21.51 km^{2}. In 2008 Stabroek celebrated its 750-year-old existence. Saint Catherine's Church stands in the village-center. It is dedicated to Catherine of Alexandria, who is the patron saint of Stabroek.

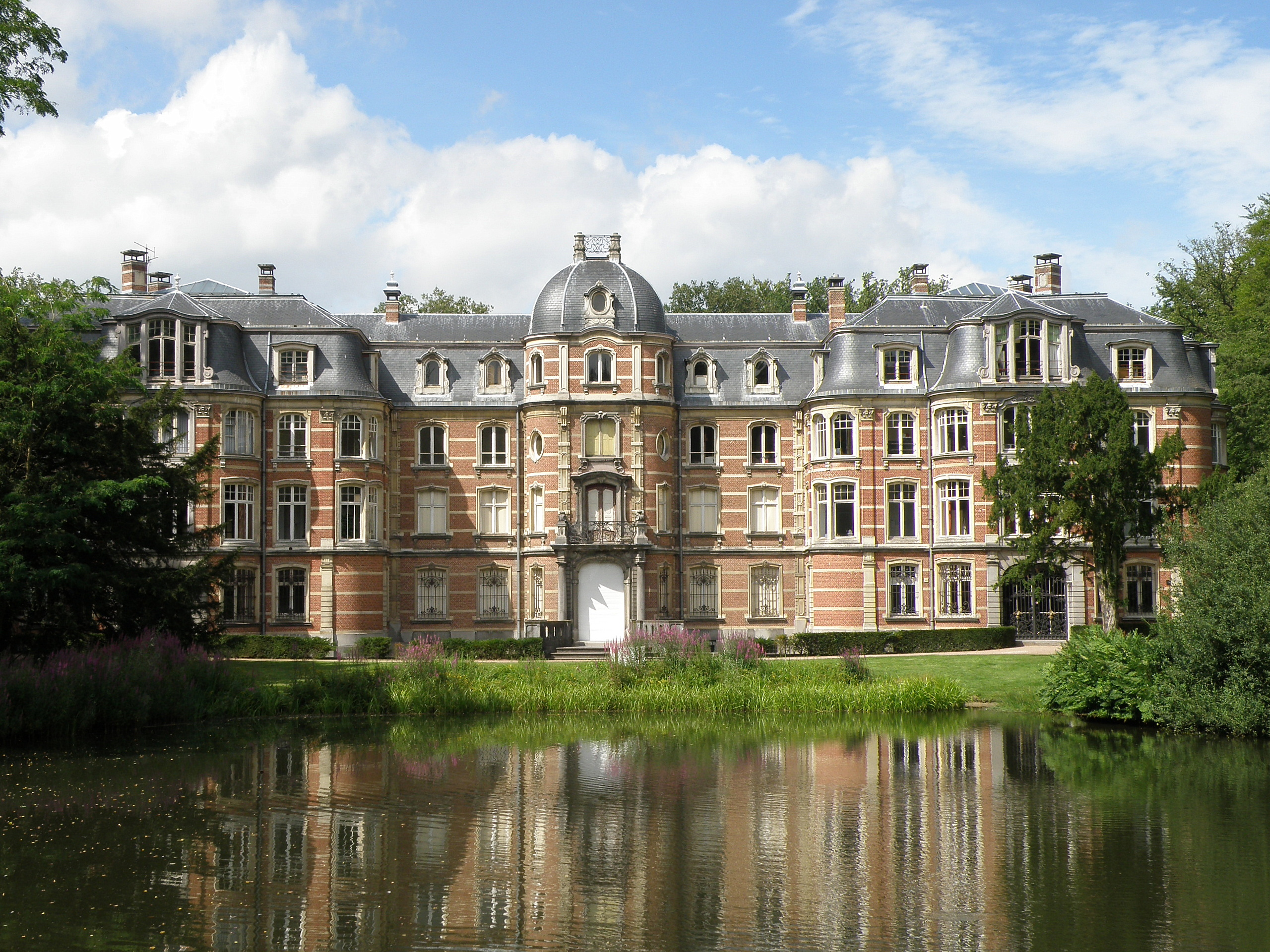
Ravenhof castle in Stabroek-Putte

== Famous Inhabitant ==
- Thomas Vermaelen, retired Belgian football player, currently assistant coach for the Belgium national football team
