= Nicolaas Geelvinck =

Dutch businessman

Nicolaas Geelvinck (3 June 1732, Amsterdam – 7 December 1787, The Hague), son of Nicolaes Geelvinck, Lord of Stabroek, was President of the Dutch West India Company from 1764 until 1787.

In 1764, Nicolaas Geelvinck became schepen (alderman) of Amsterdam as well the President of the Dutch West India Company. In 1771, he became President of the Society of Suriname. The city of Stabroek, Guyana was named after Geelvinck in 1784. In 1812, the city was renamed Georgetown after King George III.
