= Museum Geelvinck-Hinlopen =

Building in Amsterdam, the Netherlands

Museum Geelvinck Geelvinck Hinlopen Huis
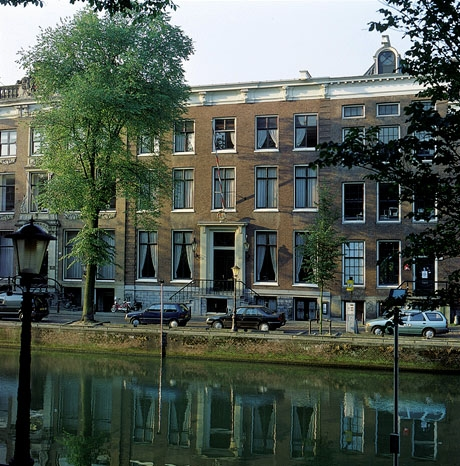
- The museum viewed from the Herengracht

- Location in Amsterdam
- Established: c. 1687 (building)
- Location: Keizersgracht 633; Amsterdam, Netherlands
- Coordinates: 52°21′51″N 4°53′28″E
- Type: Art museum
- Public transit access: Tram line 16, 24, or 25
- Website: www.geelvinckhinlopenhuis.nl

Museum Geelvinck was situated from its opening 1991 till the end of 2015 in a canal-side mansion, the Geelvinck Hinlopen Huis in Amsterdam, the Netherlands. This patrician mansion, close to the Rembrandtplein, was built for Albert Geelvinck (1647–1693) and Sara Hinlopen (1660–1749), then in an attractive and new laid-out section of the city towards the Amstel. In the year 1687 the couple moved into this double wide canal house on the Herengracht 518, with storage rooms in the cellar, under the attic and in the warehouse on the Keizersgracht 633, now the museum entrance.

The canal mansion 'Geelvinck Hinlopen Huis' is now closed for the public, because the museum (including the rosarium) has moved to new premises. In Spring 2017 the museum opened its new premises in the historic mansion 'De Wildeman' in Zutphen, but had to close down already by the end of 2019. Today, Museum Geelvinck is located at the country estate 'Kolthoorn House' in Heerde, and also has a modest venue at the 'Posthoornkerk' in Amsterdam.

== History ==
Albert Geelvinck came from the upper class Geelvinck family, who had acquired their wealth through merchant shipping to Spain, Africa, Suriname and the West Indies. Sara Hinlopen came from a family of originally Flemish cloth merchants, private investors and in an early stage involved in the governing the city and the Dutch East India Company (VOC). Both families belonged to the regents of Amsterdam. The republican Geelvincks delivered five burgomasters (mayors) in the 17th and 18th century. They too served in the Admiralty of Amsterdam, Dutch West India Company (WIC) or the Society of Surinam.

Sara became an orphan at the age of six. Then she and her sister Johanna were raised by a stepmother Lucia Wijbrants. Because the cooperation did not work out well, they moved in with Jacob J. Hinlopen, their uncle, in 1672. Keen on leaving the house, she married in 1680 the fifteen-year-older lawyer Albert Geelvinck. A few months before the girls came by lot in the possession of the paintings by Rembrandt, and Gabriël Metsu, collected by their father Jan J. Hinlopen.

In 1695, she married Jacob Hendricksz. Bicker (1642-1713), eighteen-years her senior, without community of property and separated from bed. In 1749 she died at the age of almost 89, but blind. The house, her stocks and bonds, her paintings and her books, including the cash money (ƒ2,50), was divided into lots and went to Nicolaes Geelvinck and his three sisters.

=== Garden and rooms at the Geelvinck Hinlopen House ===
Between the entrance and the mansion is a spacious and quiet garden. The back of the garden is a Renaissance garden, while the front is a formal and symmetrical French garden with a large pond and a fountain. Most of the time there is an exhibition of statues. Going up the stairs to the main floor of the museum, there are four rooms open to the public.

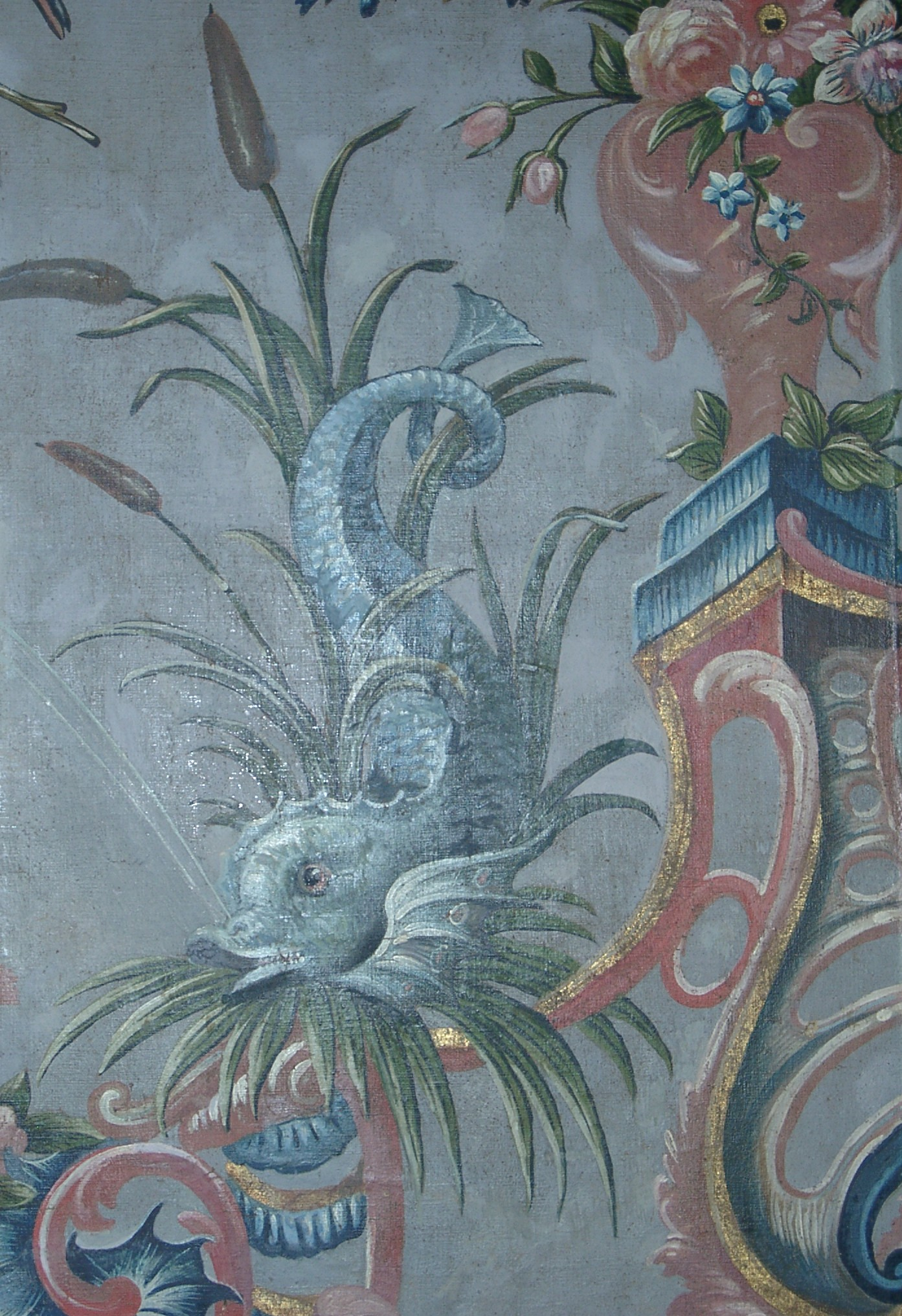
Detail of the wallpaper in the Chinese room

The Blue room in a Louis XVI or neo-classical style has an ensemble of five wallpaper panels, painted around 1788 by Egbert van Drielst. Van Drielst was a romantic painter, who in his style was influenced by Meindert Hobbema and Jacob van Ruisdael. On all the panels nature is idealised, the horizon is on eyeheight. Originally the panels were designed for a house on the Keizersgracht, then decorating a room in New York and Miami, but since 1990 they are back. On the chimney are two porcelain jars from the factory of Joannes de Mol.

The Red Room is decorated in either a Louis XV or a neo-Rococo style. The high ceiling and the fixed mirrors are impressive. There are six 17th-century paintings in this room: a Flemish fantasy landscape with tree, game and birds by Gillis d'Hondecoeter; also depicting Christ healing the blind. Further there is still life with flowers but without a saint by Daniel Seghers, a Jesuit from Antwerp, a flashy still life by Pieter de Ring, a seascape by Hans Goderis and a winterscape by Antonie van Stralen. On the table is an interesting piece of Kraak porcelain.

The ceiling in the library is in a neo-classical style, resembling the work of the Scottish architect and interior decorator Robert Adam. Adam, was inspired by the Domus Aurea in Rome and the palace of Diocletian in Split.

In the hall one can see a tapestry, made in Brussels around 1600, depicting Cyrus the Great and the rich Croesus, after his defeat and the revolt of the citizens. The story comes from Herodotus, (book I: 155). The carton was designed by Michiel Coxcie, the Flemish Raphael, and the original belongs to the Spanish royal family.

The Chinese Room has eight Rococo wallpaper panels on canvas with fantasy flowers and birds, vegetables and chinoiserie, made somewhere between the years 1765–1775. The artist, working in the cuir de Cordoue manufacture of Cornelis 't Kindt in Brussels, perhaps used engravings by Jean-Baptiste Pillement, then famous for his chinoiserie. The table is in scagliolatechnique, and once belonged to Frederick William III of Prussia.

- In June the museum used to participate in the Open Garden Days.
- The museum programs concerts, sometimes on historic fortepianos, such as the Broadwood square piano; this program continues now in other historic houses and castles, such as the Posthoornkerk and Castle Heeswijk (near Den Bosch), where the museum has located some of its historic pianos.
- The first exhibitions in the museum was in 1991 on Antoine Ignace Melling.

By the end of 2015, Museum Geelvinck had to move to new premises. Since Spring 2017, the Geelvinck Muziek Museum opened for the public at the historic house 'De Wildeman' in Zutphen (till end of 2016 this was the Museum Henriëtte Polak, which had moved to the 'Hof van Heeckeren'). Museum Geelvinck was forced out of its Zutphen venue already by the end of 2019 and since moved to the country estate 'Kolthoorn House' in Heerde. Since 2012, Museum Geelvinck also has a modest venue in the 'Posthoornkerk' in Amsterdam (the collection of historic pianos is on view by appointment only). Museum Geelvinck collaborates in the partnership 'Geelvinck Muziek Musea' with the 'Geelvinck Pianola Museum' and 'Huis Midwoud' (Midwoud). Museum Geelvinck continued its weekly Geelvinck Salon concert series first in the Museum Cromhouthuis in de Cromhouthuizen and, since the closure of this venue, starting in Autumn 2018 in the Luther Museum Amsterdam.

== See also ==
- List of music museums
