= Vroedschap =

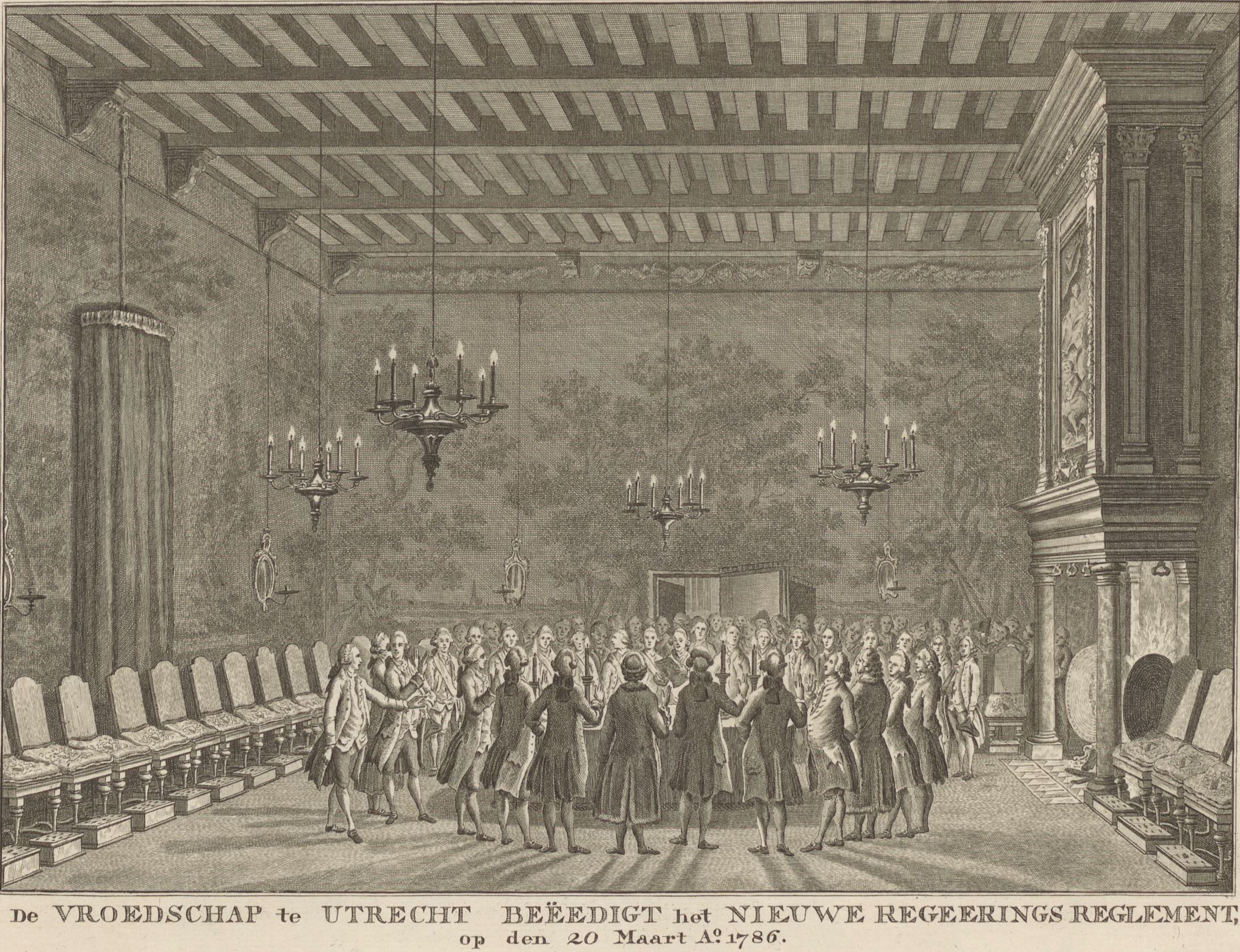
Vroedschap of Utrecht, 1786.

The vroedschap (Dutch pronunciation: [ˈvrutsxɑp]) was the name for the (all male) city council in the early modern Netherlands; the member of such a council was called a vroedman, literally a "wise man". An honorific title of the vroedschap was the vroede vaderen, the "wise fathers"

Most early modern Dutch cities were ruled by a government of male burghers or poorters (bourgeois) who were members of the regent class, the ruling elite. During late Medieval times, the regents had in all cities gradually managed to exclude men of the artisan class from membership, making themselves a sort of hereditary city nobility. In the Dutch Republic, a city administration consisted of the magistrate and the vroedschap. The magistrate (or city government) consisted of a number, often four, of burgomasters assisted by a number of aldermen (schepenen), and looked after the daily administration of the city. In most cities, the mayors were chosen for a period of four years. The previous (and usually the youngest) mayor was responsible for the schutterij, the civil militia. The vroedschap appointed the magistrate, mostly from its own ranks; sometimes other members of the regent class were proposed. There was a complicated system of drawing lots and in many cities a shortlist was made from which the stadtholder, the highest provincial executive official, could choose; from 1748 this became a general system for the Dutch Republic.

The vroedschap was convened on financial questions, sometimes on national politics, and always for elections for the appointment of important local posts, such as governor appointments for institutions like the poor house, orphanage, and almshouses. The vroedschap thus served the economic interests in which its members had an important share. In contrast to magistrates, vroedschapsleden ("members of the city council") were appointed for life. The council consisted of ten to forty citizens, that met weekly or less often. They chose one or two new mayors and representatives to the Provincial States in January each year.

Membership was based on uitverkiezing (cooptation) and inheritance. Family ties were important, as were good breeding and social status in the community. Vroedmannen had to satisfy three basic conditions: male, membership of the Calvinist church and ownership of a house. Although city administrations, by present standards, were more oligarchic than meritocratic, family ties never formed a formal legal basis for election.

In times of crisis, the stadholder sometimes appointed new vroedschapsleden in a province, to ensure that his followers were in power, a so-called wetsverzetting ("change of the legislative"). This happened in 1619, 1672, 1748 and 1787. There was no legal basis for such an act.
