= Hendrik August van Kinckel =

Dutch naval officer, reformer, diplomat and British agent

Hendrik August baron van Kinckel, born as Heinrich August Künckelin (14 August 1747 in Heilbronn – 10 November 1821 in Mannheim), though of German extraction, was a Dutch naval officer and reformer, diplomat, and British confidential agent.

== Personal life ==
Van Kinckel (Note: Who used the Dutch version of his name in correspondence, though he mainly wrote in French) was born the fifth son of August Wolfgang Künckelin, an official of the Duchy of Cleves, and Rosina Elisabetha Pancug (the daughter of a burgomaster of Heilbronn). The father was ennobled in 1752, as Freiherr von Kinckel, and this became the name under which van Kinckel was later known. He married baroness Elisabeth Charlotte Henriette Catherine von Botzheim in Wachenheim an der Pfrimm on 23 September 1789. The marriage remained childless.

== Career ==
=== Navy ===
Van Kinckel entered the service of the Admiralty of Zeeland as a sub-lieutenant (without first having been an adelborst (Note: Cadet or midshipman.)) in 1764. He was probably sponsored by Johan Adriaan van de Perre, the representative of the First Noble (Note: The States of Zeeland were the only provincial States in which the stadtholder, in his capacity of Marquis of Veere and Vlissingen, had a vote, as the so-called "First Noble" of Zeeland (he was supposed to represent the other Zeeland nobles). He usually exercised this right through a representative.) in the States of Zeeland, and also a member of the Zeeland Admiralty Board, whose protégé he would be for many years. His first voyage was on the frigate St. Maartensdijk (24) under captain Cornelis Vis, that left Vlissingen on 27 August 1764 for a cruise against the Barbary pirates in the Mediterranean Sea. After this first voyage he served on De Jonge Prins van Oranje for a number of voyages, in 1765 under captain de Kruijne, (Note: Against whom van Kinckel and other officers lodged a complaint after the return of the ship, though the affair came to nothing.) and later (between 1767 and 1770) four voyages under captain Hendrik Bernard Lodewijk van Bylandt. (Note: Who managed to hit a sandbank in 1769, but was exonerated thanks to favorable testimony from van Kinckel.) Van Kinckel had been promoted to lieutenant in 1766, after he passed his lieutenant's exam in September.

In 1771 the Dutch navy mounted a larger expedition to the Mediterranean, involving several ships of the line. Zeeland contributed the Zierikzee (captain Nebbens), and van Kinckel became its second lieutenant, charged with keeping the ship's journal. Soon after its departure, according to the journal, the ship's crew experienced health problems, many getting sick and dying, probably because of scurvy. This necessitated several lengthy visits to ports on its route, causing the Zierikzee to miss most of the cruise of the squadron (which was commanded by captain van Goor Hinloopen). Eventually, the ship would also lose captain Nebbens, who died of a stroke while on a shore excursion with van Goor Hinloopen near Livorno. After the ship's return under the second captain, Bonifacius Cau, in 1772, van Kinckel was promoted to commander, but for the next three years he did not have another ship. Only in 1775 did he receive a posting on the frigate Walcheren (captain Bonifacius Cau) for a cruise to again the Mediterranean. He returned home in November 1776, and asked his mentor van de Perre to obtain a promotion to captain for him. He was promoted to extraordinary captain on 11 November 1777.

Instead of immediately getting a Dutch command, van Kinckel made a curious excursion to the British Royal Navy during the American Revolutionary War in 1778, where he served under Admiral Keppel against the French on HMS Victory, which provided him with combat experience. (Note: Van der Aa; this biographer gives no source, and does not mention whether van Kinckel was present at Ushant. However, in an autobiographical note to the Duke of Portland, van Kinckel himself appears to suggest that he did; Cf. Bakhuizen, p. 76)

In June 1779 van Kinckel got his first command, as captain of the ship of the line Zuid Beveland (60). His first problem was to find a crew, as manning a ship was the captain's responsibility. As the Dutch navy at the time had a bad reputation as an employer, it was almost impossible to recruit Dutchmen. Van Kinckel therefore decided to set up four recruiting centers around his native Heilbronn, managed by his brothers. They recruited 250 Germans for the crew that eventually would number 472 men (two-thirds of whom Germans).

This experience motivated van Kinckel to write a report for the stadtholder, who was also Admiral-General of the Dutch Navy, in which he proposed to put the personnel policy of the navy on a new footing. Up to then the five Dutch admiralties had been responsible for manning and victualing their respective fleets, but in his report, entitled Un projèt pour la levée d'un certain nombre d'hommes pour la service de la marine de la Republique (Note: A project for the raising of a certain number of men for the service of the navy of the Republic. Though both could write and speak Dutch, van Kinckel used French in his correspondence with the stadtholder.) (1779), he proposed that there would be organised a corps de marine, especially consisting of specialists like gunners and non-commissioned officers, who were otherwise difficult to recruit or retain, and would function directly under the Admiral-General. He wrote a more detailed proposal along these lines in 1780 with the title Considérations sur la necessité et sur I'utilité d'un corps de mariniers pour la service de la Republique. (Note: Considerations about the necessity and the utility of a corps of mariners (not: marines) for the service of the Republic. The innovation here was that the corps would be organised on the level of the Generality, above the level of the five regional Admiralties.) This brought him to attention of the stadtholder, with whom he discussed the proposal for the first time in the Spring of 1781. On 17 April 1781 the plan was formally approved by six of the seven provinces in the States General of the Netherlands, but Zeeland vetoed it "for lack of money." In 1782 the stadtholder appointed van Kinckel as one of the two Adjutants of the "corps de marine" he had proposed (Note: Though only after a conflict with his rival Lodewijk van Bylandt, who was originally appointed in the post. Van Kinckel made an appeal to his higher seniority. Also, the fact that van Bylandt was embroiled in the Brest Affair may have rendered him less suitable at the time.) The appointment was only nominal, as the corps itself was not founded before 1792. (Note: Van Kinckel also proposed a number of other reforms in a memorandum to the Admiral General in 1781, that would go nowhere at this time, but would eventually be realized in the naval reforms of the Batavian Navy under the Batavian Republic, such as appointment of a constructor-general to coordinate naval construction; the founding of a "widows and orphans fund" for the navy; the creation of a budget for the navy within the War Budget of the Republic (up to then the navy was financed exclusively by the five admiralties); and the centralization of the education of naval officers, including limitation of the recruitment of future naval officers (the adelborsten) to people of noble birth. Finally, he helped introduce the Carronade in the Dutch navy in 1780.Cf. Van der Horst, pp. 175-176)

The Zuid Beveland was mainly employed to protect the Zeeland coastal waters in the first days of the Fourth Anglo-Dutch War that started in December 1780. The ship was intended to join the squadron of rear-admiral Johan Zoutman before it fought the Battle of Doggerbank in August 1781, but the usual "adverse winds" had prevented it from getting out to sea. Van Kinckel therefore did not share in the glory. (Note: Van Kinckel may not have been completely devastated by missing a chance to engage the British, as witnessed by a letter he wrote to the Duke of Portland in April 1795, in which he states: "I would have liked to be able to put a veil over an event that took place soon after, the war between England and the Republic. Though I did my duty as an officer, I do not hide that I felt an extreme repugnance to taking part in this fight against (my) nature; a sentiment that I by the way shared with the entire Dutch navy."; Cf. Bakhuizen, p. 76) However, the ship later captured two English ships and van Kinckel shared in the prize money.

After peace had been concluded in 1784 van Kinckel asked to be promoted to ordinary captain, which request was granted on 26 September 1784. But van Kinckel did not receive a new command. Instead he was given a diplomatic assignment to the Electorate of Bavaria, where he was to report on the developments around the intrigues of Charles II August, Duke of Zweibrücken to exchange Bavaria for the Austrian Netherlands

But van Kinckel in this period embarked on another career, that is only cursorily touched upon in his official biographies. Van Kinckel was clearly a partisan on the Orangist side in the political upheavals of the Patriottentijd in the Dutch Republic. In the period 1785-1787 the opponents of the stadtholder, William V, Prince of Orange, gained more and more influence. The British envoy to The Hague, Sir James Harris saw in this the perfidious hand of the French, and he made it his life's work to reclaim the influence of Great Britain on the Republic, by hook and by crook. One of his first actions was to lure the province of Zeeland away from the other provinces in the Spring of 1786 (a rather harebrained project to have Zeeland secede from the Union of Utrecht). The bait was a promise to save the Zeeland Chamber of the VOC from impending bankruptcy by providing a British loan for that purpose to the States of Zeeland. For the negotiations about this project Harris used van Kinckel as his political emissary, with whom Harris had established a relationship in October 1785, according to a letter from Harris to the British Foreign Secretary Carmarthen. From this moment on, van Kinckel was one of Harris' most trusted confidential agents. In May 1786 van Kinckel wrote a memo for Harris pointing out that instead of a real secession, the threat of it would be more useful to put pressure on the Patriots in the States of Holland. Van Kinckel used his Zeeland contacts to bring Harris in contact with the Zeeland Grand Pensionary Laurens Pieter van de Spiegel shortly thereafter. (Note: Van Kinckel writes in his autobiographical note that before that he himself had been sent by van de Spiegel on two diplomatic missions to London. Cf. Bakhuizen, pp. 76-77) Harris managed to convince Van de Spiegel to become his main agent of influence in the Republic.

From this time on, van Kinckel assisted Harris in his projects, like the attempt to "flip" the States of Friesland to the Orangist side, by offering bribes to the grietmannen; (Note: The States of Friesland had been "anti-stadtholder" in 1784, when the scandal of the Acte van Consulentschap broke, but Harris proposed to bring a different majority about, by manipulating the system of grietenijen (comparable to the Rotten and pocket boroughs Harris was familiar with in England). The grietman needed a certain acreage of land, but would mortgage it immediately, as he only needed the votes. These mortgage loans were usually provided by wealthy Frisian Mennonites, who were very anti-Orangist, and therefore directed the grietmannen to vote against the Orangists. So Harris proposed that the British government would buy mortgages to the amount of 2 million guilders. But the approval by the Cabinet came too late, as the election of February 1787 had already taken place, and the Orangists had already lost. The scheme was therefore not implemented. But the States of Friesland later split into two rival versions (like the States of Utrecht) one in Franeker and the other in Leeuwarden, and the "Leeuwarden" States were seated in the States General, giving a majority there to the Orangists; Cf. Cobban, pp. 88-89) and an attempt to sabotage the mission of the French diplomat Joseph Matthias Gérard de Rayneval to mediate between the warring Dutch factions in early 1787. In that context van Kinckel provided useful counter-intelligence on the French agitators in Amsterdam, that had established a kind of "parallel" French legation there. Van Kinckel accompanied Harris on his secret visit to the British Cabinet at the end of May 1787, in which Harris managed to convince his superiors to go all out on a campaign of subversion in the Republic. For this he obtained a large secret fund, hat would be used to suborn Dutch States Army regiments that had been loyal to the States of Holland, after those withdrew those troops from the command of the stadtholder in 1786. When a month later the wife of the Stadtholder, Princess Wilhelmina, was detained by a Patriot Free Corps patrol at Goejanverwellesluis, Harris dispatched van Kinckel post-haste from The Hague, to prevent her capture by the die-hard Patriots in Utrecht under the Rhinegrave of Salm, who might have held her as a hostage.

Finally, van Kinckel played an important "bit part" in the conclusion of the Anglo-Prussian Treaty of Alliance in June 1788 at Het Loo Palace. King Frederick William II of Prussia was visiting his sister at this palace, when he was "waylaid" by Harris with the project of the treaty. The king did not have his usual advisers with him, except Heinrich Friedrich Karl vom und zum Stein, who might have advised him against the treaty. But van Kinckel bribed the king's valet de chambre to deny Stein access to the king.

On 16 July 1787 (so while the crisis of the Prussian invasion of Holland was still unfolding), van Kinckel got his next command of a ship: the frigate Tholen (49). But he did not succeed in gathering a crew for this ship, so he had to relinquish this command to another captain. On 9 November 1788 van Kinckel was promoted to rear-admiral of the Zeeland Admiralty. When Vice-Admiral Cornelis Vis died in 1789 van Kinckel asked for his post, and a promotion to Vice-Admiral. But the Admiral-General wanted the advice of the successor of van de Perre in the Zeeland Admiralty Board, and that functionary apparently gave a negative advice, because the promotion was not given. Van Kinckel then left active service and married the baroness von Botzheim.

=== Diplomacy ===
Van Kinckel then entered diplomatic service. His first posting was as envoy extraordinary and minister plenipotentiary to the Elector of Bavaria in 1789. He remained here until the Batavian Revolution of 1795. After the War of the First Coalition broke out in 1792, in which the Republic, together with Prussia and Great Britain was part of a coalition of European powers that fought against the French First Republic, van Kinckel attached himself to the campaign headquarters of the Prussian king, again with Harris, who had become the Earl of Malmesbury, but also Sir James Pulteney, Lord Elgin, and the Marquess of Hertford, who were subsequently his colleagues at this mobile court.

In 1795 he was dismissed from the naval service, like all other naval officers, by the new regime, and declined to join the Batavian Navy. Instead he again went into British service. He traveled with Lord Malmesbury to England. After his arrival he attempted to attach himself to the court of the exiled stadtholder, but he was told that there was not enough money to take him aboard. Fortunately, he obtained a pension of £500 annually from the British. After a while (Note: During his stay he apparently started an extramarital affair with one Louise Stuart, a "piquante brunette". That ended abruptly after the lady applied the epithet insipidement blond (insipid blond) to him after a lover's quarrel. After that the tone of their correspondence changed appreciably, reflecting the hurt feelings of the baron. Cf. Bakhuizen, p. 79) he went back to the Continent, becoming a liaison-officer between the Royal Navy, and the Orangists in Germany, who plotted a return of the stadtholder. He gathered intelligence for both the stadtholder in England, and his son Prince Frederick of Orange-Nassau in Prussia. At this time he bought the house in Mannheim where he would live till his death.

From van Kinckel's correspondence it becomes clear that he was very opposed to the Democratic developments of the time in the Batavian Republic and revolutionary France. With ex-stadtholder William V he deplored the "... malheur de la Révolution française." And he stated in another letter "je n'ai plus un brin de Patriotisme" (I don't have a bit of Patriotism left). His ideological conviction made him apply for a position in the Russian navy around the time of the Anglo-Russian invasion of Holland in 1799, in which he had hoped to take a part. (Note: He had accompanied Lord Grenville on his reconnaissance of the Batavian Republic, that preceded this invasion. Cf. Bakhuizen, p. 79) But his motivation was also: "'Les serviles raisons qui pourroit me motiver d'entrer au service de la Russie durant la guerre actuelle servit celle ambition pour me faire connaitre et tacher d'acquerir une reputation ... au service de sa majesté l'imperatrice de toutes les Russies.". (Note: The servile reasons that could motivate me to enter the service of Russia during the present war served that ambition to make myself known and to try to acquire a reputation ... at the service of her majesty the Empress of all the Russias.) In any case, the appointment did not come through. Until the Peace of Amiens in 1802 he continued his liaison work for the British.

Of his experiences during the years from 1803 to 1813 little specific is known. But the fact that his biographer Van der Aa complains that he was "persecuted" by "French agents" indicates that he may still have been active as a British agent. (Note: The fact that the biographical note in Bakhuizen says that after the restoration of the Prince of Orange in 1813 "...van Kinckel left the British service and put himself at the disposal of the Prince..." seems to be a little slip of the pen that gives the game away; Bakhuizen, p. 80.) After the Battle of Leipzig in 1813 he joined the headquarters of the Allies. After the return of the Prince of Orange to the Netherlands in 1813 van Kinckel again joined the Dutch diplomatic service. He was appointed envoy at no less than three German princely courts at the same time: the Grand Duchy of Baden, the Kingdom of Württemberg, and the Kingdom of Bavaria in 1814. These embassies he would exercise until his death in 1821.

Like other Orangist naval officers, who had been dismissed in 1795, van Kinckel was readmitted to the new Koninklijke Marine and promoted to Vice-Admiral on 1 July 1814. But to his chagrin he was retired from active service in 1817, as an austerity measure. On 18 July 1815 he was made a Commander in the Military Order of William.

Van Kinckel died 74 years old in Mannheim on 10 November 1821. His wife inherited 20,000 guilders, and the Will noted that she was also entitled to an annual pension of 1,000 guilders from the Dutch navy "widows and orphans" fund that van Kinckel had originally proposed.

== Sources ==
- Aa, A.J. van der (1862). "Hendrik August baron van kinckel in: Biographisch woordenboek der Nederlanden. Deel 10". Digitale Bibliotheek voor de Nederlandse Letteren (in Dutch). pp. 175–176.
- Bakhuizen van de Brink, R.C, L.P.C. van den Bergh, and J.K.J. de Jonge (eds.) (1857). "Mémoires et correspondances du baron de Kinckel, in: Het Nederlandsche rijks-archief; verzameling van onuitgegeven oorkonden en bescheiden voor de geschiedenis des Vaderlands". Google Books (in French).
- Cobban, A. (1954). Ambassadors and secret agents: the diplomacy of the first Earl of Malmesbury at the Hague. Jonathan Cape.
- Horst, F. van der (2000). Daar donderd het canon van Vinckel aan de Theems!: Hendrik August, baron van Kinckel (1747-1821), in: J.R. Bruijn, A.C. Meijer, A.P. van Vliet (eds), Marinekapiteins uit de achttiende eeuw. Een Zeeuws elftal (in Dutch). Den Haag/Middelburg. pp. 167–179.
