= Charles Olivier de Saint-Georges de Vérac =

French military officer and diplomat

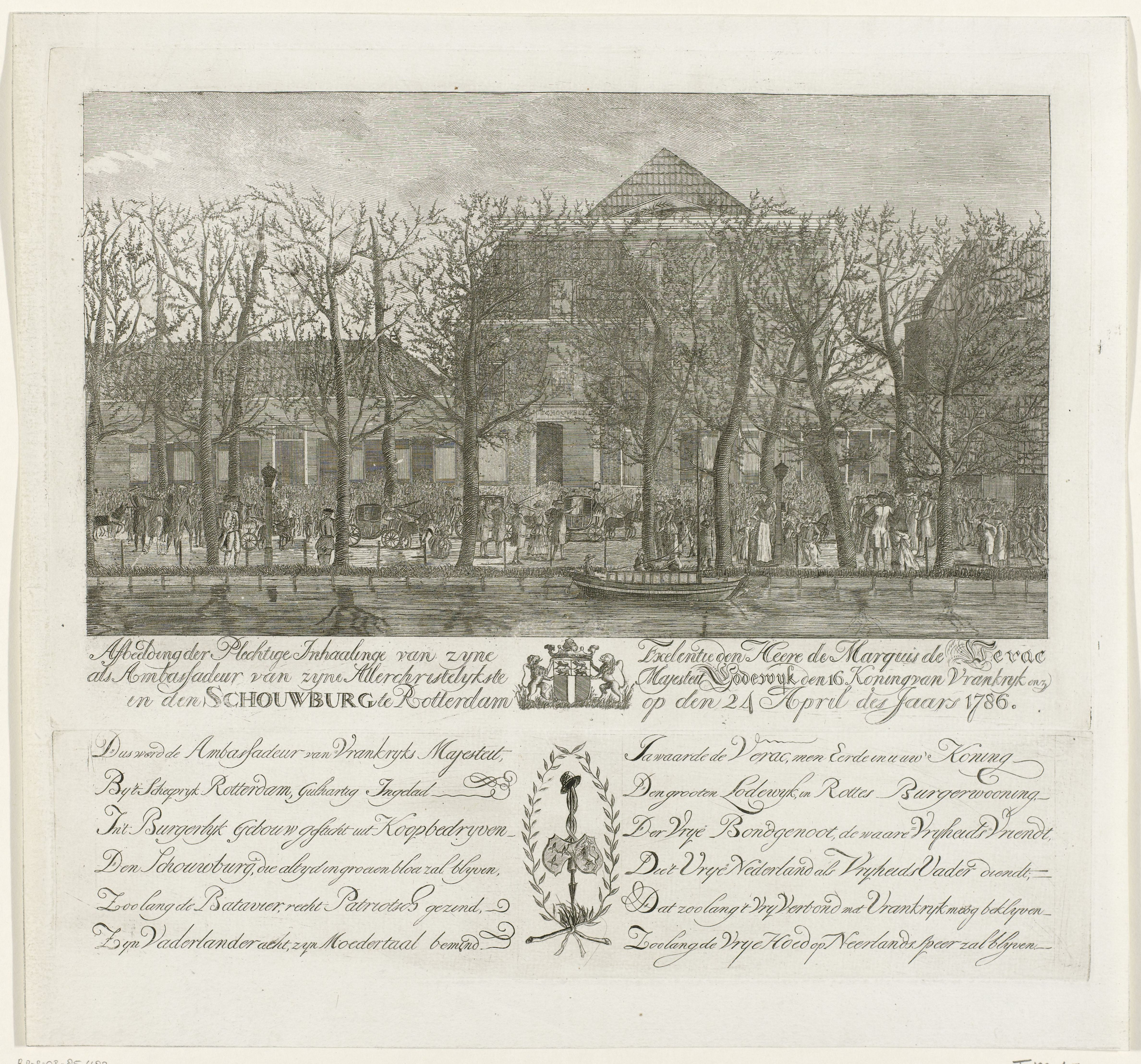
Arrival of the French envoy to the States General of the Netherlands, Charles Olivier de St. Georges, Marquis de Vérac, on 24 April 1786 at the Theater on the Coolsingel in Rotterdam

Charles Olivier de Saint-Georges, 4th Marquis of Vérac (10 October 1743 in Chateau of Couhé-Vérac – 28 October 1828) was a French military officer and diplomat of the French Ancien Régime.

== Personal life ==
Vérac (as he is commonly known in the historical literature) was the son of François Olivier de Saint-Georges de Vérac and Elisabeth Marie de Riencourt. His father, grandfather and great-grandfather were lieutenants général de Province of Poitou. He himself received that rank at age 10. (Note: Under the Ancien Régime it was not unusual to give public offices as sinecures to underage people, so that they could enjoy the emoluments, while the work was done by someone else.)

He married Marie Charlotte Joséphine Sabine de Croÿ d'Havré, the daughter of the Duke of Havré on 14 April 1760. They had the following children:

- Charles François Marie Joseph 1761–1763
- Anne Louis Joseph César Olivier 1763–1838
- Alphonse Christian Théodoric Joseph Olivier 1765
- Anne Justine Elisabeth Joséphine 1767
- Olivier Armand Maximilien François 1768–1858
- Gabriel Louis Christian Joseph +1839

== Career ==
Vérac entered the Musketeers of the Guard in 1757. In 1761 he became Aide-de-camp of his father-in-law during the Seven Years' War. He was wounded in the arm at the Battle of Villinghausen by the same cannon ball that killed his father-in-law. In 1767 he was appointed Colonel of the Régiment de Grenadiers de France. In 1770 he was promoted to Mestre de camp. Soon after, he was made a Chevalier de St. Louis.

After this accomplished military career he entered the diplomatic service in 1772, when he was sent as an envoy extraordinary and minister plenipotentiary to the court of Hesse-Kassel. His next posting was the court of Denmark–Norway in 1774. In 1779 he was accredited at the court of Catherine the Great, where he stayed till he was promoted and sent as ambassador to the States General of the Netherlands in The Hague in 1784.

The Dutch Republic at the time was in the middle of the political upheavals of the Patriottentijd. The American Revolutionary War had just ended in 1783, but the Fourth Anglo-Dutch War, of which it was a part, only ended in 1784. There had therefore not been a British envoy for some time, but at the end of 1784 the new British envoy Sir James Harris also came to The Hague. They would be each others opponents in the coming years. Both were deeply involved in the internal politics of the country, Vérac on the side of the Patriots, the opponents of the Orangist party of the stadtholder William V, Prince of Orange. (Note: Whom the French government no longer recognized as Prince of Orange, since the principality had been ceded to France in 1713; Vérac therefore always referred to the Prince as "Prince de Nassau.") Harris became the de facto leader of the Orangists. Both engaged in espionage and covert political operations against their political opponents. Vérac actively supported the aspirations of the "democratic" wing of the Patriots, latterly also against the Patriot regenten, when the two factions became each others enemies. During the Patriot Revolt of 1785-1787 Vérac financially supported the Free Corps that occasionally fought the Dutch States Army troops of the stadtholder. After the incident on 28 June 1787 of the arrest of Princess Wilhelmina, the spouse of the stadtholder, who was the sister of king Frederick William II of Prussia, (Note: An anecdote Vérac in later life liked to relate is, that he and the British envoy Harris were playing cards on the evening the incident took place. Evidently Harris, having no news about the Princess whom he was expecting to arrive, got so worried that he was off his usually astute game, and he lost a lot of money; Cf. Cobban, p. 151) a European diplomatic crisis developed. France tried to keep the Prussians and British at bay, while protecting its interests in the Dutch Republic. Unfortunately, the French foreign policy was in disarray after the death of minister Vergennes earlier in 1787. The new foreign minister Montmorin had a less sure hand. Also, there was a government crisis at the end of August, (Note: The French minister of War de Ségur resigned when Brienne became premier ministre.) just when the Prussian invasion of Holland was imminent. The political maneuvering in France between the different factions undermined his position, as the chevalier de la Luzerne was angling for his job. Vérac was recalled on 20 August 1787. Montmorin assured him that there was no personal dissatisfaction with him, and that he would receive a pension while a new position was found for him. Vérac's biographer Michaud speculates that the recall was motivated by the fact that Vérac opposed the return of the stadtholder as military governor of The Hague (a post he had been deprived of by the States of Holland in 1786), but this is unlikely as it was official policy of both the French government and the Dutch government in power at the time, just as he had faithfully executed the French policy towards the Patriots.

After his recall Vérac remained for two years sous la remise ("on the backburner") before he was again given a diplomatic post, this time as ambassador to the Old Swiss Confederacy in 1789. But after the Flight to Varennes of king Louis XVI in June 1791 Vérac immediately handed in his resignation. He departed for Lindau. Later he resided for short periods at Venice, Florence and Regensburg. But after he had resigned he had been registered as an Émigré, which brought penalties of proscription with it. His worldly goods were confiscated and mostly sold off, or destroyed, his noble titles burned.

Vérac was able to return to France in 1801, and lived as a private citizen until the Bourbon Restoration of 1814 and 1815. King Louis XVIII gave him the (this time military) rank of Lieutenant-General, and did him the honor of allowing him to participate in the "Grandes Entrées". (Note: During the so-called Petit lever after the king had risen from his bed, the king received courtiers he wanted to honor during the so-called grandes entrées of the court.) Vérac spent his final years in his birthplace among his family. He died on 28 October 1818, just over 85 years old.

== Sources ==
- "Charles Olivier de Saint-Georges de Vérac". Roglo Genealogical database (in French).
- Cobban, A. (1954). Ambassadors and secret agents: the diplomacy of the first Earl of Malmesbury at the Hague. Jonathan Cape.
- Michaud, L.G. (1843–1865). "Vérac (Charles Olivier de Saint-Georges, marquis de), in: Biographie universelle ancienne et moderne : histoire par ordre alphabétique de la vie publique et privée de tous les hommes avec la collaboration de plus de 300 savants et littérateurs français ou étrangers, vol. 43, 2e édition". Google Livres (in French). pp. 129–130.
