= James Harris, 1st Earl of Malmesbury =

British diplomat and politician (1746–1820)

The Right Honourable The Earl of Malmesbury GCB
- Portrait by Charles Bestland, c. 1807, after Thomas Lawrence, c. 1806

Lord Lieutenant of Hampshire
- In office 22 August 1807 – 21 November 1820
- Monarch: George III
- Preceded by: The Lord Bolton
- Succeeded by: The Duke of Wellington

Member of the House of Lords
- Lord Temporal
- In office 19 September 1788 – 21 November 1820
- Preceded by: Peerage created (Note: Malmesbury barony.)
- Succeeded by: The 2nd Earl of Malmesbury

Personal details
- Born: James Harris; 21 April 1746 Salisbury, Wiltshire, England
- Died: 21 November 1820 (aged 74)
- Spouse: Harriet Mary Amyand
- Children: Lady Frances Harris; Lady Catherine Harris; James Harris, 2nd Earl of Malmesbury; Rev. Hon. Thomas Alfred Harris

James Harris, 1st Earl of Malmesbury (21 April 1746 – 21 November 1820) was a British diplomat and politician.

== Early life (1746–1768) ==
Born at Salisbury, the son of James Harris, an MP and the author of Hermes, and Elizabeth Clarke of Sandford, Somerset. He was educated at Winchester, at Merton College, Oxford and did Law and History at the University of Leiden (1765-1767).

== Early diplomatic career: Spain (1768–1771) ==
Harris arrived in Spain in December 1768 and became secretary to the British embassy at Madrid, and was left as chargé d'affaires at that court on the departure of Sir James Grey in August 1769 until the arrival of George Pitt, afterwards Lord Rivers. This interval gave him his opportunity; he discovered the intention of Spain to attack the Falkland Islands, and was instrumental in thwarting it by putting on a bold countenance. As a reward he was appointed minister ad interim at Madrid.

== Envoy-extraordinary in Berlin (1772–1776) ==
In January 1772 Harris was appointed envoy-extraordinary to Prussia in Berlin, arriving on 21 February. Within a month of his arrival he became the first diplomat to hear of Frederick the Great's partition of Poland with the cooperation of Russia. His service in this office was undistinguished but he made an impression on Frederick, who requested that he be reappointed.

== Marriage (1777) ==
Harris married Harriet Maria Amyand, the youngest daughter of Sir George Amyand and Anna Maria Korteen, and sister of Anna Maria Amyand, who married Sir Gilbert Elliot (later 1st Earl of Minto).

They had four children together:

- Lady Frances Harris (d. 1 November 1847) m. General Sir Galbraith Lowry Cole
- Lady Catherine Harris (d. December 1855) m. General Sir John Bell
- James Edward Harris, 2nd Earl of Malmesbury (19 August 1778 – 10 September 1841), m. Harriet Susan Dashwood
- Rev. Hon. Thomas Alfred Harris (24 March 1782 – 15 December 1823) m. Maria Markham, daughter of George Markham, Dean of York

== Envoy-extraordinary in St Petersburg (1777–1783) ==
In autumn of 1777, Harris travelled to Russia to be envoy-extraordinary to Russia, an office he held until September 1783. At St Petersburg he made his reputation, for he managed to get on with Catherine II, in spite of her predilections for France, and steered adroitly through the accumulated difficulties of the first Armed Neutrality. He was made a Knight of the Bath at the end of 1778; but in 1782 he returned home owing to ill-health, and was appointed by his friend, Charles James Fox, to be minister at The Hague, an appointment confirmed after some delay by William Pitt the Younger in 1784.

== The Hague (1784–1788) ==
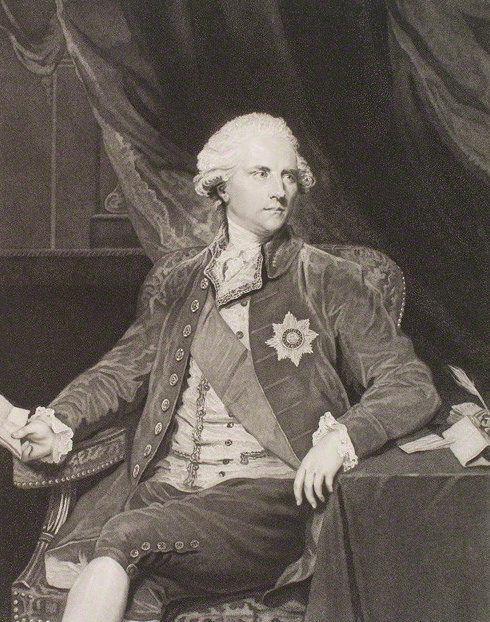
Engraving by Caroline Watson, c. 1786, after a portrait by Joshua Reynolds, c. 1785

He did very great service in furthering Pitt's policy of maintaining England's influence on the Continent by the arms of her allies, and held the threads of the diplomacy which ended in the king of Prussia's overthrowing the Patriot republican party in the Dutch Republic, which was inclined to France, and re-establishing the stadtholder, William V, Prince of Orange, in his dictatorial powers. As envoy, Harris immersed himself in Dutch politics from 1784 on and managed to become the de facto leader of the Orangist party. He and his French counterpart, Charles Olivier de Saint-Georges de Vérac, the French ambassador to the States General of the Netherlands, fought a secret war with the help of agents of influence, like the then-Grand Pensionary of the province of Zeeland, Laurens Pieter van de Spiegel, and the confidential agent Hendrik August van Kinckel, and spies like Pierre Auguste Brahain Ducange. Harris returned to London in secret at the end of May 1787, where he managed to convince the Cabinet to endorse a policy of subversion in the Dutch Republic, to be funded by £70,000 from a slush fund, laundered through the king's Civil list. Harris agents used the money to bribe regiments of the Dutch States Army in the pay of the Patriot States of Holland, that had deposed the stadtholder as Captain-General of that Army, to defect. The counter-measures of the States of Holland precipitated a political crisis that prompted the States to ask for French mediation. The arrest of Princess Wilhelmina, the wife of the stadtholder, on 28 June 1782, gave Prussia and Great Britain an opening to muscle in on this diplomatic mediation, and eventually offered an excuse to intervene militarily. In recognition of his services he was created Baron Malmesbury, of Malmesbury in the County of Wiltshire on 19 September 1788, and permitted by the King of Prussia to bear the Prussian eagle on his arms, and by the Prince of Orange to use his motto "Je maintiendrai".

In 1786 he told Pitt that France was "an ambitious and restless rival power, on whose good faith we never can rely, whose friendship never can be deemed sincere, and of whose enmity we have the most to apprehend." He also wrote to Robert Murray Keith: "...from everything I hear and observe, there is not the least doubt that France is working hard at the formation of a League, the object of which, is the Destruction of England."

The historian Paul Langford has claimed that Harris "proved brilliantly effective as a focus for Orangist and anti-French feeling, and as the agent of Anglo-Prussian cooperation".

== Wilderness (1788–1793) ==
He returned to England and took an anxious interest in politics, which ended in his seceding from the Whig party with the Duke of Portland in 1793.

== French Revolutionary War (1793–1797) ==
In that year he was sent by Pitt, but in vain, to try to keep Prussia true to the first coalition against France. In 1794, he was sent to Brunswick to solicit the hand of the unfortunate Princess Caroline of Brunswick for the Prince of Wales, to marry her as proxy, and conduct her to her husband in England. For once his diplomatic skills seem to have failed him: confronted with Caroline's bizarre manner and appearance, he sent no advance word to the Prince, who was so shocked by the sight of his future wife that he asked Malmesbury to bring him brandy.

=== French peace missions ===
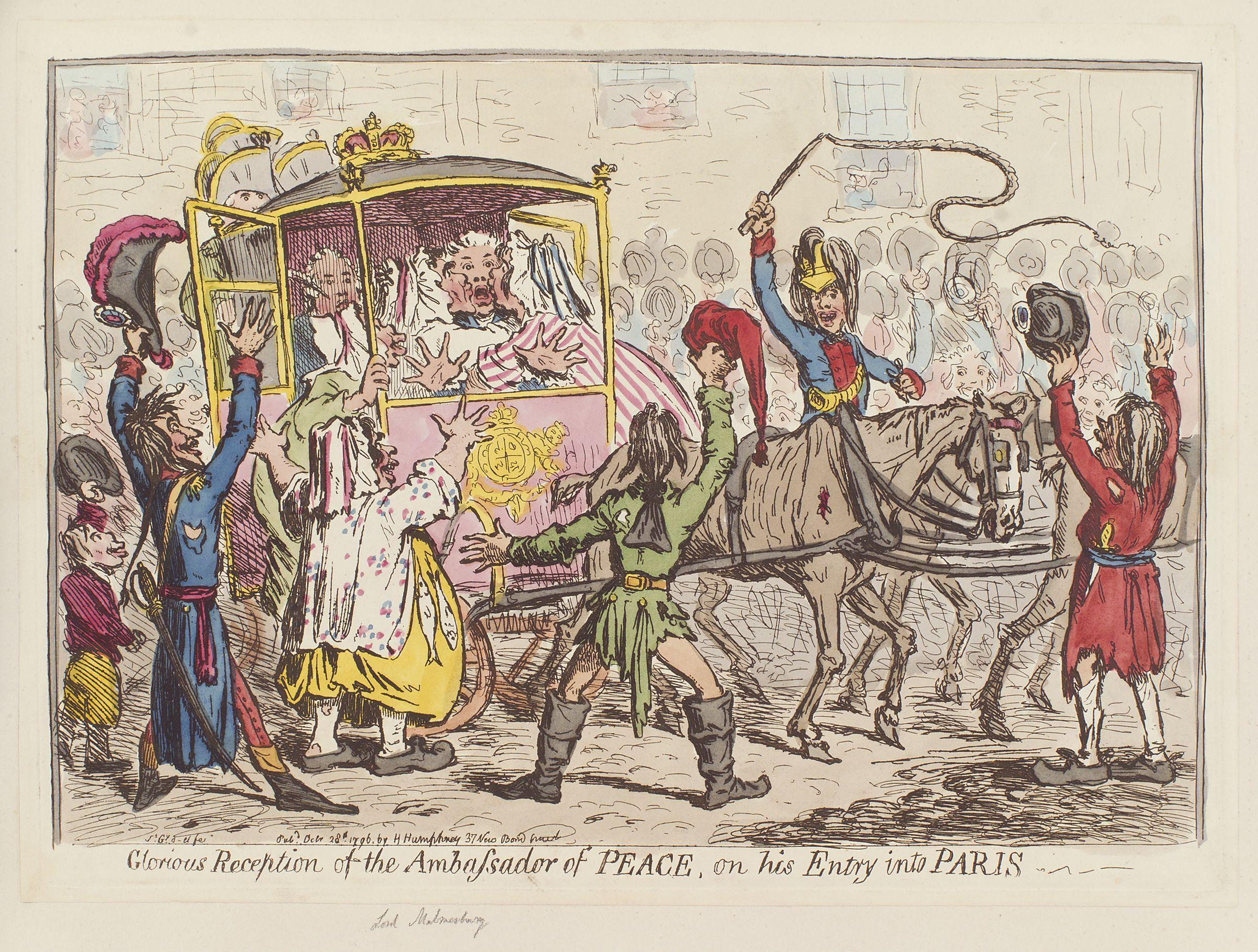
Glorious reception of the Ambassador of Peace, on his entry into Paris by James Gillray (1796).

In 1796 and 1797 he was in Paris vainly negotiating with the French Directory, and then in Lille in summer 1797 for equally fruitless negotiations with John Skey Eustace and the Directory's plenipotentiaries Hugues-Bernard Maret, Georges René Le Peley de Pléville and Etienne Louis François Honoré Letourner.

Due to bad roads in France, Malmesbury reached Paris on 22 October 1796, a week after leaving London. This led the foremost opponent of peace with France, Edmund Burke, to quip that his journey was slow because "he went the whole way on his knees".

== Later life (1798–1820) ==
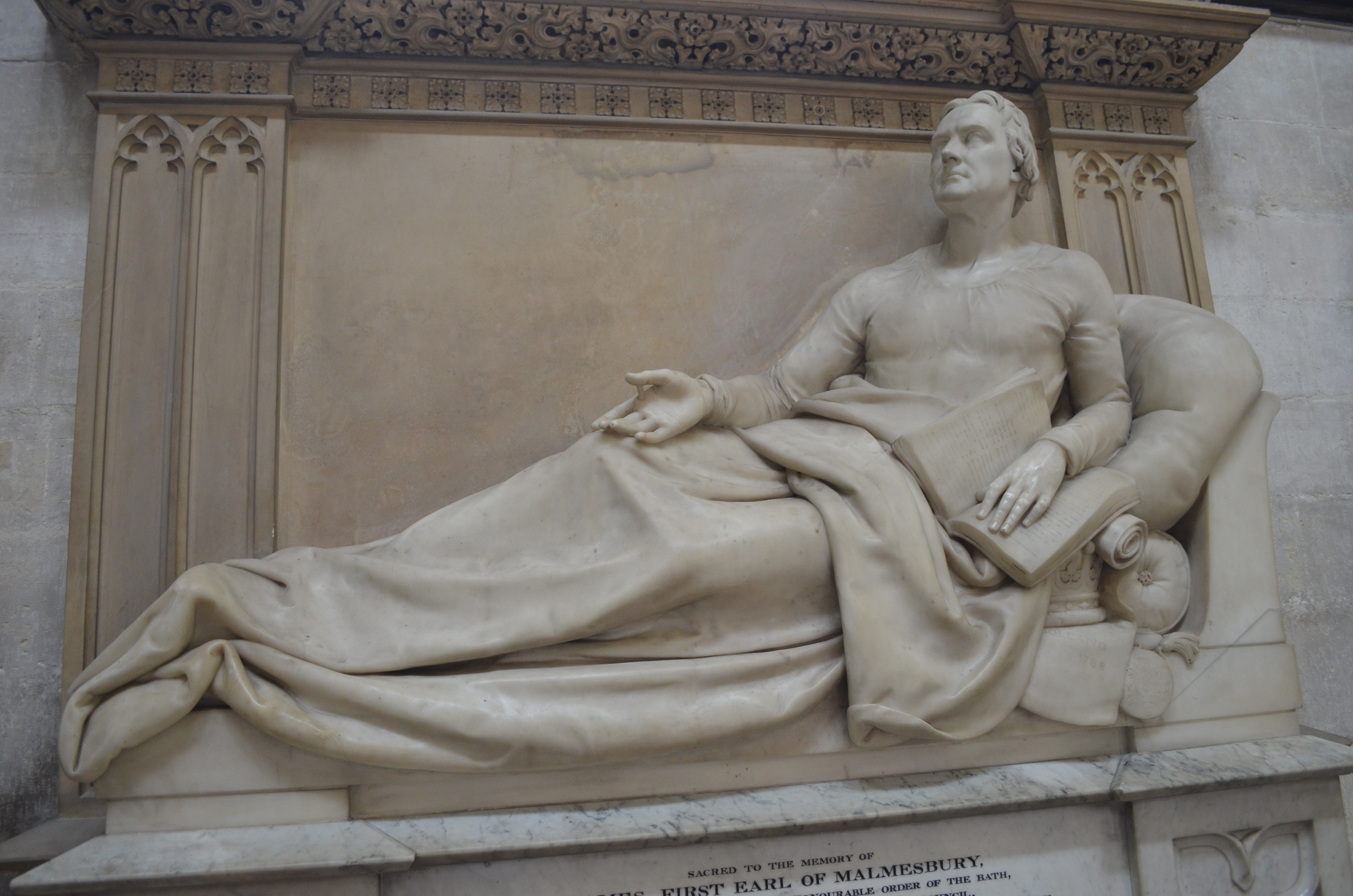
Salisbury Cathedral, Monument to James Harris, 1st Earl Malmesbury

After 1797, he became partially deaf, and quit diplomacy altogether; but for his long and eminent services he was on 29 December 1800 created Earl of Malmesbury and Viscount FitzHarris of Hurn Court in the County of Southampton.

He now became a sort of political Nestor, consulted on foreign policy by successive foreign ministers, trusted by men of the most different ideas in political crises, and above all the confidant, and for a short time after Pitt's death almost the political director, of Canning. Younger men were also wont to go to him for advice, and Lord Palmerston particularly, who was his ward, was tenderly attached to him, and owed many of his ideas on foreign policy directly to his teaching. His later years were free from politics, and until his death on 21 November 1820 he lived very quietly and almost forgotten.

His monument in Salisbury Cathedral was sculpted by Francis Chantrey.

== Legacy ==
As a statesman, Malmesbury had an influence among his contemporaries which is scarcely to be understood from his writings, but which must have owed much to personal charm of manner and persuasiveness of tongue; as a diplomatist, he seems to have deserved his reputation, and shares with Macartney, Auckland and Whitworth the credit of raising diplomacy from a profession in which only great nobles won the prizes to a career opening the path of honour to ability. One historian called him "the greatest English diplomat of the eighteenth century." Paul Langford has claimed that Malmesbury "was by any standards a brilliant diplomat as well as an experienced one. Though he was not disposed to undervalue himself, neither were others; Talleyrand considered him the ablest British diplomat of the age and certainly his achievement at the Hague was to sustain such a judgement".

Malmesbury remarked that it was "a truth inculcated into John Bull with his mother's milk, viz. that France is our natural enemy". He said on another occasion that "The history of the present century afforded repeated proofs, that the English fought and conquered less for themselves than for the sake of their allies, and to preserve that equilibrium of power, on which the fate of all Europe depends".

Malmesbury did not publish anything himself, except an account of the Dutch revolution, and an edition of his father's works, but his important Diaries (1844) and Letters (1870) were edited by his grandson.

He was a Member of Parliament (MP) for Christchurch from 1770 to 1774 and from 1780 to 1788.

His former residence Malmesbury House in Salisbury takes its name from his title.

== Sources ==
- Jeremy Black, Natural and Necessary Enemies. Anglo-French relations in the Eighteenth Century (Duckworth, 1986)
- Alfred Cobban, Ambassadors and Secret Agents: The Diplomacy of the First Earl of Malmesbury at The Hague (Jonathan Cape, 1954).
- John Ehrman, The Younger Pitt, 3 vols. (1969–96).
- Paul Langford, The Eighteenth Century 1688-1815 (Adam and Charles Black, 1976).
- Isabel de Madariaga, Britain, Russia and the Armed Neutrality of 1780: Sir James Harris's Mission to St Petersburg During the American Revolution (Yale University Press, 1962).
- H. M. Scott, ‘Harris, James, first earl of Malmesbury (1746–1820)’, Oxford Dictionary of National Biography, Oxford University Press, 2004; online edn, May 2009, accessed 7 August 2011.

Parliament of the United Kingdom
Preceded by Hon. Thomas Robinson; James Harris	Member of Parliament for Christchurch; 1770–1774; With: James Harris	Succeeded by Thomas Villiers Hyde; James Harris
Preceded by Thomas Villiers Hyde; James Harris	Member of Parliament for Christchurch; 1780–1788; With: James Harris; Sir John Frederick, Bt	Succeeded by Hans Sloane; Sir John Frederick, Bt
Diplomatic posts
Preceded by Robert Gunning	British Minister to Prussia; 1772–1776	Succeeded by Hugh Elliot
Preceded by Robert Gunning	British Ambassador to Russia; 1776–1783	Succeeded by Alleyne FitzHerbert
Preceded by Sir Joseph Yorke	British Ambassador to the Netherlands (Minister until 1788); 1784–1789	Succeeded by Alleyne FitzHerbert
Preceded by Sir Morton Eden	British Minister to Prussia; 1793–1795	Succeeded by Lord Henry Spencer
Honorary titles
Preceded by The Lord Bolton	Lord Lieutenant of Hampshire; 1807–1820	Succeeded by The Duke of Wellington
Peerage of Great Britain
New creation	Earl of Malmesbury; 1800–1820	Succeeded by James Harris
New creation	Baron Malmesbury; 1788–1820; Member of the House of Lords (1788–1820)	Succeeded by James Harris
