= Willem Gerrit Dedel Salomonsz =

Dutch politician (1734–1801)

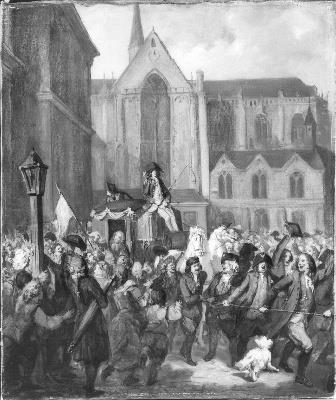
Burgemeester Dedel carried home in triumph by a mob in 1787

Willem Gerrit Dedel Salomonszoon (Note: The placing of the patronymic, "Salomonszoon", is atypical, as usually such a patronymic was used as a middle name, as in Jan Pieterszoon Sweelinck, or Dedel's contemnporary Hendrik Daniëlsz Hooft. However, in this case, the patronymic was used informally by later biographers to distinguish him from namesakes like Willem Gerrit Dedel (1726 - 1768), and in such a case the patronymic was usually added after the surname.) Ambachtsheer of Sloten and Sloterdijk (20 April 1734 in Amsterdam – 2 January 1801 in Amsterdam) was a Dutch politician during the Patriottentijd in the Dutch Republic.

== Personal life ==
Dedel was the son of Salomon Dedel, an Amsterdam merchant who traded on France and the Dutch West Indies, and Agneta Maria Boreel. Together with his father, he founded the firm Salomon & Willem Gerrit Dedel & Co. in 1758, which appears to have been dissolved in 1776. He married Jacoba Elisabeth Crommelin (the daughter of a Haarlem burgemeester) on 3 June 1764 in Haarlem. They had two sons and two daughters.

== Career ==
Dedel held many public offices in Amsterdam: commissioner in 1757, schepen 1761, councilor in the vroedschap 1768, hoofdofficier (public prosecutor) (Note: See for one of the cases Dedel prosecuted, the murder trial of Johannes Bartholomeus Ferdinandus van Gogh, Spierenburg, P.C, and P.Spierenburg (2004). Written in Blood: Fatal Attraction in Enlightenment Amsterdam. Ohio State University Press.) 1769–1781, burgemeester in 1784, 1787, 1790, 1793. He was appointed a councilor in the Admiralty of the Noorderkwartier in 1782–1783, and the Admiralty of Amsterdam in 1785–1786, 1791–1792. Commissioner of the States of Holland and West Friesland for the mail in Amsterdam in 1780. He was also Canon of the Church of St. Marie in Utrecht (Note: At the time this was not a Roman Catholic church, but a congregation of the Dutch Reformed Church. However the Cathedral chapter had been held over from medieval times to administer the goods of the church.) from 1757 to 1775.

During the Patriottentijd he was a member of the Dutch States Party Regenten in Amsterdam, just as his colleague Joachim Rendorp. That is to say that he opposed the stadtholder, William V, Prince of Orange, but was not a sympathizer of the "democratic" wing of the Patriots, like his colleague Hendrik Daniëlsz Hooft. This would lead to his temporary downfall in the Spring of 1787. He and Hooft had been elected burgemeester of Amsterdam (together with two others) in February 1787. One of their first tasks was to decide about Amsterdam's standpoint in the matter of sending the so-called "Legion of Salm", a brigade of mercenary soldiers that was paid by the States of Holland, and was not part of the Dutch States Army, under the command of the Rhinegrave of Salm, to The Hague, as a "supplementary" garrison to the Dutch Blue Guards that already garrisoned the city, but were considered "unreliable". The mission was opposed by the Orangists in the vroedschap of Amsterdam because it would weaken the position of their political friends in the States of Holland. The Amsterdam schutterij (at least a large group of officers under leadership of Colonel Isaac van Goudoever) tried to convince the vroedschap with a threatening demonstration at the Amsterdam City Hall on 26 February 1787 to vote in favor of the mission. Dedel did his best to withstand this pressure, but the vroedschap caved in under the threats. With the support of the Amsterdam delegation in the States of Holland, the motion to prohibit the mission would have carried, and the Legion would not be sent to The Hague, but now the opposite resolution passed.

After this first defeat, Dedel was ready to switch to the Orangist side. The Amsterdam population was sharply divided between the Patriots and the Orangists. An important Orangist group were the so-called Bijltjes (Little Axes), the laborers in the Amsterdam shipbuilding industry, who were fiercely Orangist, but no friends of the States-Party regenten (now commonly called "aristocratic Patriots") around Dedel and Rendorp. They would, however, be ready to join the anti-Patriot regenten, if they could get the political concession that those regenten would support a return to the constitution of 1766, under which the stadtholder held extensive patronage rights. The Bijltjes had not forgotten that Dedel himself in 1785 had promoted the withdrawal of the stadtholder's right to appoint members of the Admiralty boards. They wanted to repeal that measure, but Dedel and his friends did no want to make that concession. The group around Dedel sent Abraham Calkoen, one of their members, to the stadtholder in Nijmegen on 12 April to ask him to command the Bijltjes to drop their demand, and order them to start violent demonstrations to support the policies of Dedel against the Patriot schutters and Free Corps. Calkoen offered the stadtholder reinstatement as Captain-General of the States Army, the command of the Hague garrison (that had also been taken away from him), and the dismissal of the Patriot Amsterdam pensionary Engelbert François van Berckel and Grand Pensionary Pieter van Bleiswijk (the first to be replaced by Rendorp) if the stadtholder would help mobilize the Bijltjes. But the rights of appointment and military justice were issues on which the Amsterdam regenten would not budge. An agreement with the stadtholder was reached on 14 April. However, the representatives of the Bijltjes had not given their consent and they balked. Then, on 20 April the news about the secret negotiations broke and the Amsterdam schutters under van Goudoever revolted. A petition to purge the vroedschap of Orangist members was presented under the force of arms, and on 21 April these members slinked away. Dedel and his colleague Beels were formally dismissed as burgemeester in July 1787.

However, when the Prussian invasion of Holland and the subsequent fall of the city of Amsterdam on 10 October 1787 occurred, Dedel quietly took back his seat as burgemeester. He managed to negotiate the limitation of the occupation of the city by the Prussians to the symbolic occupation of the Leiden Gate in the Walls of Amsterdam, and this earned him the gratitude of the citizenry.

After the Batavian Revolution in Amsterdam in January 1795 Dedel retired as a private citizen. He and his wife died in January 1801 within weeks of each other.

== Sources ==
- Aa, A.J. van der (1858). "Dedel, Mr. Willem Gerrit, in: Biographish Woordenboek der Nederlanden. Deel 4". Huyghens ING (in Dutch). pp. 82–84.
- Colenbrander, H.T. (1899). "De patriottentijd. Deel 3: 1786–1787". Digital Bibliotheek voor de Nederlandse Letteren (in Dutch).
- Elias, J. (1903). "Mr. Willem Gerrit Dedel, Salomonsz., in: De Vroedschap van Amsterdam, 1578–1795. Deel 2". Huyghens ING (in Dutch). pp. 932–933.
