= Joachim Rendorp =

Dutch politician

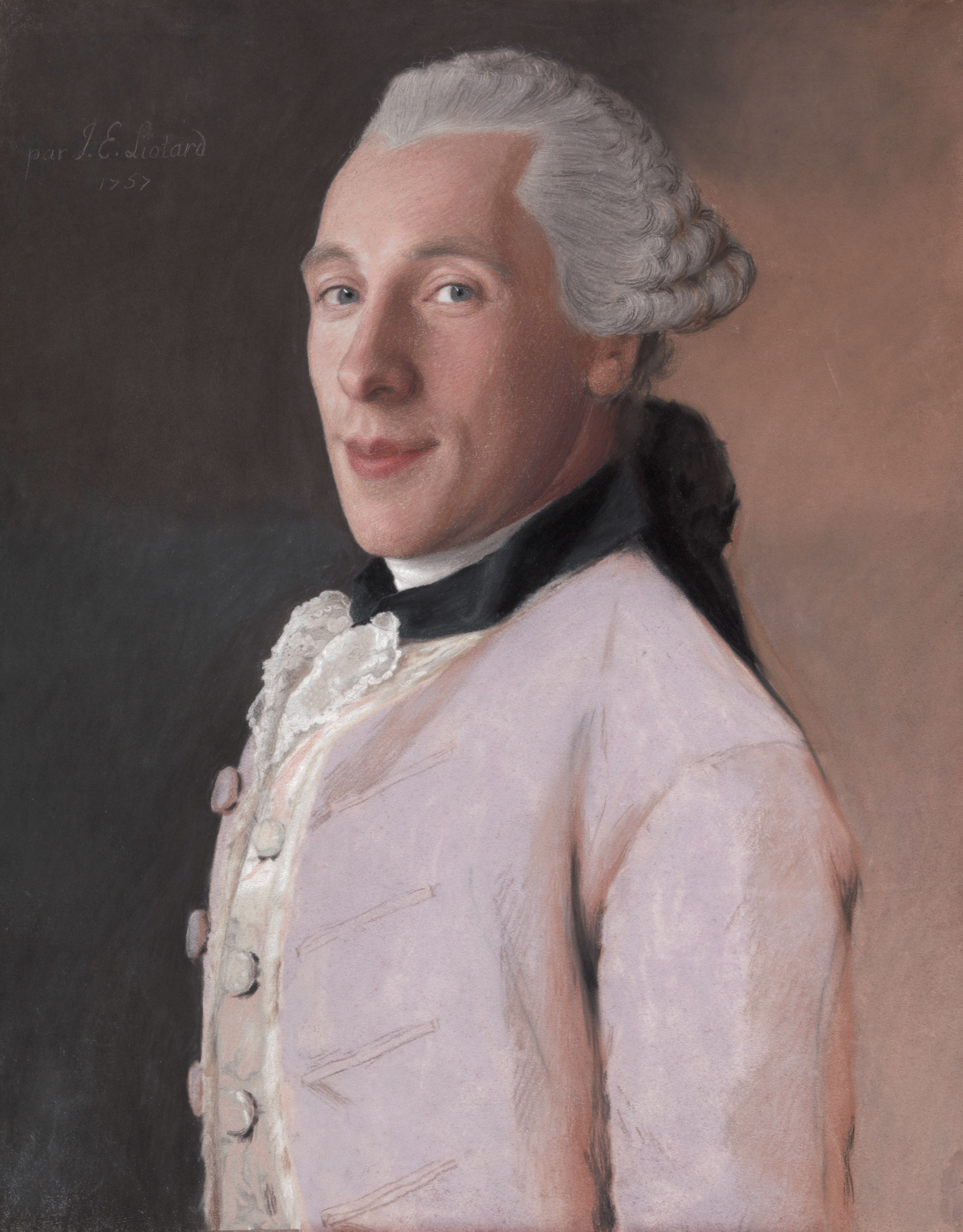
Joachim Rendorp by Jean-Étienne Liotard

Joachim Rendorp, Vrijheer of Marquette (19 January 1728 in Amsterdam – 21 September 1792 in Amsterdam) was a Dutch politician of the Patriottentijd in the Dutch Republic.

== Personal life ==
Rendorp was the son of Amsterdam brewer and burgemeester Pieter Rendorp and Margaretha Calkoen. He was a scion of an originally German, Lutheran family of wealthy brewers, that despite the discrimination against non-members of the Dutch Reformed Church had been admitted to the Amsterdam Regenten class in the 1640s. In 1744 he got a sinecure at the Amsterdam Lutheran congregation as a member of its board of regency. Two years later he received a commission in the Amsterdam schutterij. He got his law degree in 1750. He married Wilhelmina Hildegonda Schuijt, a burgemeester's daughter in 1756. They had five children of whom only one son survived into adulthood.

== Career ==
Though his brewery was an important income source, Rendorp was mainly a rentier who had a lot of time on his hands, which he spent on government and the arts. He gathered a number of sinecures, like"Meesterknaap (forester) of Holland. He was Director of the Dutch colony Suriname; (Note: This colony was the property of the Society of Suriname, a company separate of the Dutch West India Company.) Commissioner of the Audit Court of the province of Holland; member of the board of the Admiralty of Amsterdam; and (through his position in the Amsterdam vroedschap) a member of the Gecommitteerde Raden (Executive) of the States of Holland.

As a member of the Amsterdam vroedschap Rendorp soon played a role in the city's government. As most Amsterdam regenten he was a member of the Dutch States Party, the natural opponents of the Orangists in the years since the majority of the stadtholder William V, Prince of Orange in 1766 (though through his writings one could discern some ideological affinity with the latter).

The Amsterdam merchants were very interested in the possibility that the American Revolution after 1775 would reopen the American Colonies to free trade, in contravention of the British Navigation Acts. With the connivance of the Amsterdam pensionary Engelbert François van Berckel secret negotiations were opened in 1778 between the Amsterdam banker Jean de Neufville and the American diplomat William Lee in Aachen, which resulted in a draft treaty of amity and commerce. These negotiations were unofficial and did not have the approval of the Dutch government, or (officially) the Amsterdam city government. When they came to light through the interception of the intended American envoy to the Dutch Republic, Henry Laurens by the British in 1780, Rendorp was one of the officials who went after van Berckel to appease the British ambassador Sir Joseph Yorke. To no avail, however, as the British declared war anyway, and the Fourth Anglo-Dutch War broke out in December 1780.

Rendorp was elected an Amsterdam burgemeester for the first time (of many) in 1781 (after already having been a schepen since 1756, and a commissaris voor kleine zaken (petty magistrate) since 1757). Like many other States Party regents, he was an opponent of the mentor of the stadtholder, Duke Louis Ernest of Brunswick-Lüneburg who thanks to the Acte van Consulentschap had a nefarious grip on the stadtholder. Rendorp went in April 1781 with a delegation of the Amsterdam city government to the stadtholder to plead for dismissal of the Duke from the Dutch government. This caused an eruption of rage by the stadtholder, and Rendorp's lack of moral courage in the face of this conflict lost him much popular support.

In the same year, the new Austrian emperor (and sovereign of the Austrian Netherlands) Joseph II visited Amsterdam incognito, and was received by Rendorp. with whom he discussed a number of political issues of the time, like the closure of the Scheldt to shipping (an important issue for Amsterdam at the time) and the Barrier Treaty, which would soon bring the emperor into conflict with the Republic. Joseph emphasized the need for an early peace with Great Britain, for which he advised to use the services of the Sardinian consul Triquetti as an intermediary. As the emperor made the same proposal to the French envoy, de la Vauguyon, who soon put a stop to the peace feelers, this attempt at private diplomacy came to nothing. Rendorp later tried informal peace negotiations with the English secret agent Paul Wentworth and the ex-envoy Yorke, but these also failed.

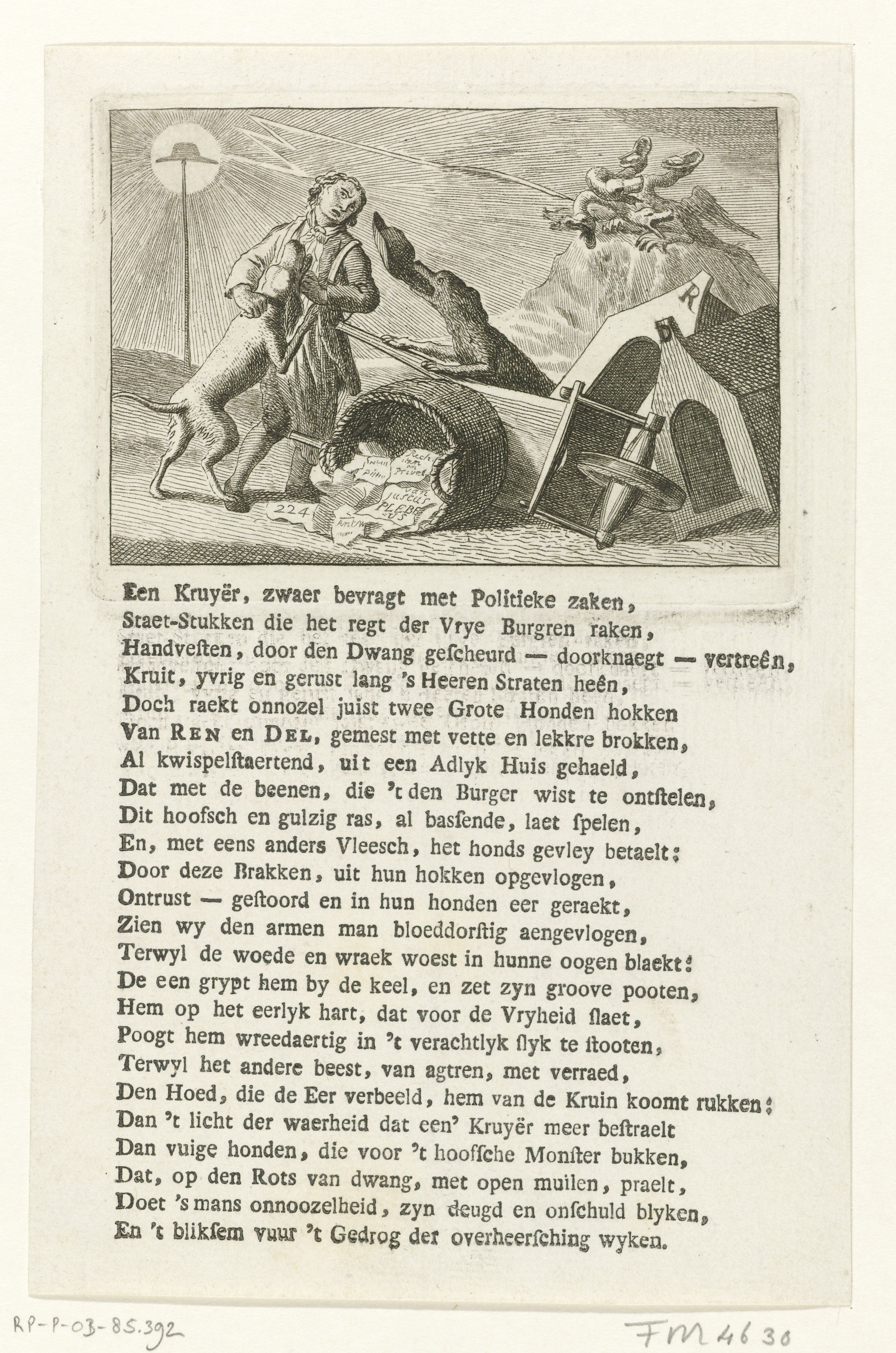
An anonymous cartoon published in 1785 about the libel case burgomasters Rendorp and Dedel of Amsterdam brought against the Patriot newspaper De Politieke Kruyer and its publisher.

Rendorp was no clear partisan of either party during the Patriottentijd. He was opposed to the stadtholder, but also to the "democratic" wing of the Patriots. When he was again elected burgemeester in 1786 he tried to keep that faction at bay, as he thought that the Patriot Revolt had gone far enough, and the aims of the States Party had already been realized by the decline in the stadtholder's powers. Because of this "moderate" stance, he was often the object of attacks in the Patriot press, like the Post van den Neder-Rhijn. As a magistrate of Amsterdam, he could directly react: in 1785 he himself sentenced several journalists and publishers to severe fines and even prison time for press offenses against himself. (Note: Though the Dutch Republic was known for its tolerant attitude to the press, especially where it concerned foreign publications in foreign languages, there was no official freedom of the press, and the authorities regularly suppressed publications they did not like.)

In the 1787 election for burgemeester Rendorp was defeated by the Patriot candidate Hendrik Daniëlsz Hooft. He, therefore, had to follow the upheavals, led by Colonel Isaac van Goudoever, that led to the overthrow of the Amsterdam city government in April 1787, from the sidelines. When at the end of May 1787 the Bijltjesoproer broke out, his house was one of the homes of Orangists that was looted by the Patriots.

After the Prussian invasion of Holland and the fall of Amsterdam on 10 October, 1787 Rendorp was readmitted to the "restored" city government. He was again elected in 1789, 1790, and 1792, the year of his death.

== Works ==
- Verhandeling over het Regt van de Jagt (dedicated to the Prince of Orange; 1771)
- Over de Militaire Jurisdictie (1775)
- Memoriën, dienende tot opheldering van het Gebeurde, geduurende den laatsten Engelschen oorlog (1792)
- Staat der generale Nederlandsche O.I. Compagnie, behelz. Rapporten van de HH. G.J. Doys, baron van der Does Mr. P.H. van de Wall, Mr. J. Rendorp en Mr. H. van Straalen, alsmede nader Rapport en Bijdragen (1792)

== Patron of the arts ==
Rendorp and his wife were art collectors. He had a large collection of paintings by Gabriël Metsu, Emanuel de Witte, Nicolaes Pieterszoon Berchem, and Jan van Huysum of whom he owned ten flower Still lifes. He had his wife and himself painted by the likes of Jean-Baptiste Perronneau, Johann Friedrich August Tischbein, and Jean-Étienne Liotard. In 1779 he invested in the Porcelain factory of Joannes de Mol, which he bought outright in 1782. He bought the house of Mattheus Lestevenon on the Herengracht in 1761, and later owned Singel No. 292.

== Sources ==
- Aa, A.J. van der (1874). "Mr. Joachim Rendorp, in: Biographisch woordenboek der Nederlanden. Deel 16". Digitale Bibliotheek voor de Nederlandse Letteren (in Dutch). pp. 240–241.
- Koppius (1937). "Rendorp, Mr. J. in P.J. Blok, P.C. Molhuysen (eds.), Nieuw Nederlandsch biografisch woordenboek. Deel 10". Digitale Bibliotheek voor de Nederlandse Letteren (in Dutch). pp. 799–801.
