= Hendrik Daniëlsz Hooft =

Dutch politician

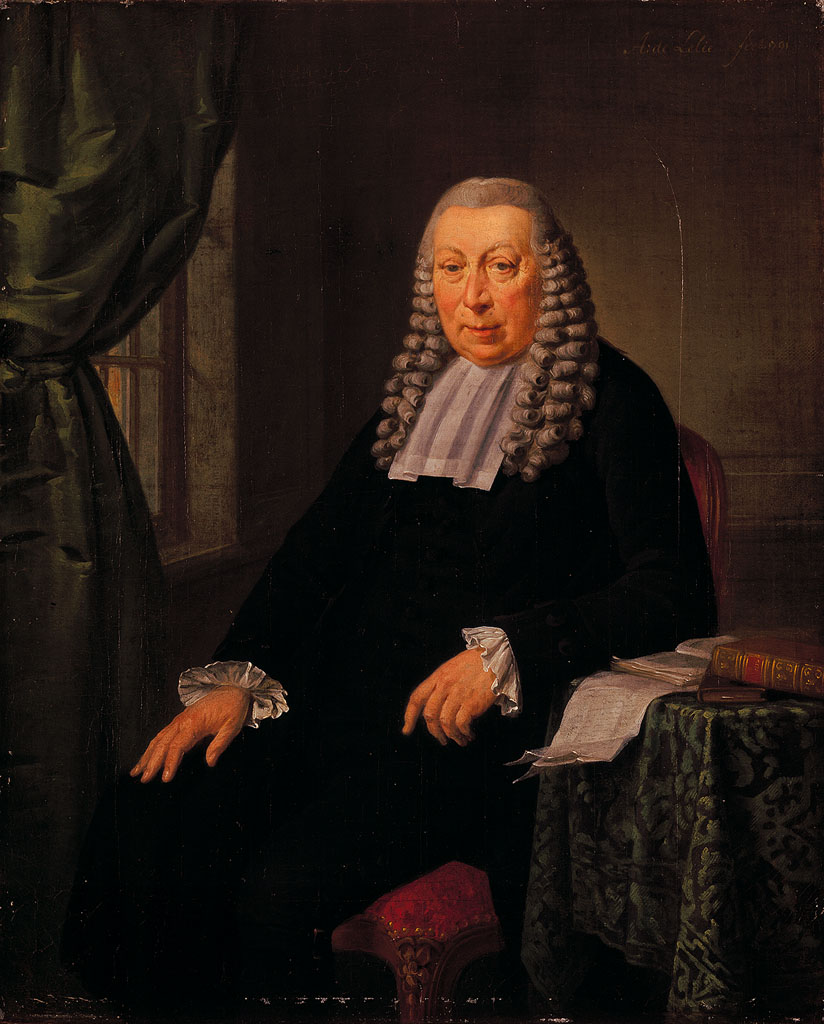
Hendrik Danielsz Hooft by Adriaan de Lelie

Hendrik Daniëlszoon Hooft, Ambachtsheer of Urk and Emmeloord (23 June 1716 in Amsterdam – 31 August 1794 in Loenersloot) was a Dutch politician during the Patriottentijd.

== Personal life ==
Hooft was the son of Daniël Gerritszoon Hooft, burgemeester of Amsterdam, and Sophia Maria Reael. He was the scion of an Amsterdam patrician family that counted many burgemeesters, like Cornelis Hooft and the poet and statesman Pieter Corneliszoon Hooft. He first married Anna Adriana Smissaert tot Sandenburg on 21 May 1744, who, however, died in childbirth on 30 April 1745. He then married Hester Schues on 30 August 1746. They had one daughter, Hester, who first married a banker (George Clifford) (Note: One of Hooft's granddaughters from this first marriage married Gijsbert Karel van Hogendorp.) and after she had been widowed, married admiral Jan Hendrik van Kinsbergen. This second wife, Hester Schues, also died early, on 10 June 1749.

== Career ==
In civilian life Hooft was a successful merchant, banker and absentee plantation holder in the Dutch colony of Berbice. In his youth he had traveled much and even been made an honorary citizen of Dublin. In later years he was co-opted in the Amsterdam vroedschap, as was his due as a member of the Hooft family of regenten, and elected several times as a burgemeester of the city. He belonged to the Dutch States Party, the traditional opponents of the party of the stadtholder, the Orangists. Though a patrician regent he felt attracted to the democratic wing of the Patriots, and was a friend of Joan Derk van der Capellen tot den Pol, the author of Aan het Volk van Nederland. He later became a member of the Council of Patriot Regenten, who tried to exercise a moderating influence on the Patriot movement. When John Adams was in Dutch Republic to secure aid for the American cause in their war of independence from the British, Hooft helped him in his mission.

On 1 February 1787 Hooft was elected first burgemeester (of three) of Amsterdam for the sixth time in his life. His colleagues were Willem Gerrit Dedel Salomonsz and Marten Adriaan Beels, also States Party regenten, though more conservative than he. The States party in Amsterdam was riding high, as in 1786 many of their objectives had been reached, especially the weakening of the power of the stadtholder William V. He had been deprived of his office of Captain-General of the Dutch States Army in October 1786 by the States of Holland. In 1785 he had already lost the command of the garrison of The Hague (where the States of Holland and the States General of the Netherlands both resided), but the loyalty of the mercenary troops in The Hague was questionable. Therefore, the leaders of the Patriot faction in the States of Holland, the pensionaries Adriaan van Zeebergh and Cornelis de Gijselaar, had proposed that the so-called "Legion of Salm" (Note: A "private army" of the States of Holland that had been founded in 1784 for its account during the Kettle War, and was commanded by the Rhinegrave of Salm.) would be put in garrison in that city as additional assurance. This controversial proposal had been referred to the Holland cities under the doctrine known as last en ruggespraak (mandate and consent), and Amsterdam held the balance in the States of Holland. It was therefore the first important issue the Amsterdam vroedschap had to decide on under Hooft's chairmanship. The majority of the council looked askance at the proposal, but there was a strong popular appeal for it under the population and by mid-February Hooft was given a petition in favor of the proposal, signed by 3115 citizens. Hooft assured their representatives that the matter was in hand.

On 21 February, however, a more forceful approach was made by the proponents of the proposal. This time a deputation of 60 officers of the Amsterdam schutterij, led by colonel Isaac van Goudoever, demanded entry to the chamber where the vroedschap was in session, discussing the proposal. This intervention so enraged the majority of the regenten, led by burgemeester Dedel, that they immediately moved to reject the proposal, and even demanded the dissolution of the "Legion of Salm". This elicited a strong reaction from the schutterij on 26 February when an even larger group of officers forced their way into the antechamber of the Council Chamber. The situation appeared to get out of hand, but old burgemeester Hooft saved the day by climbing on a chair and addressing the mob.

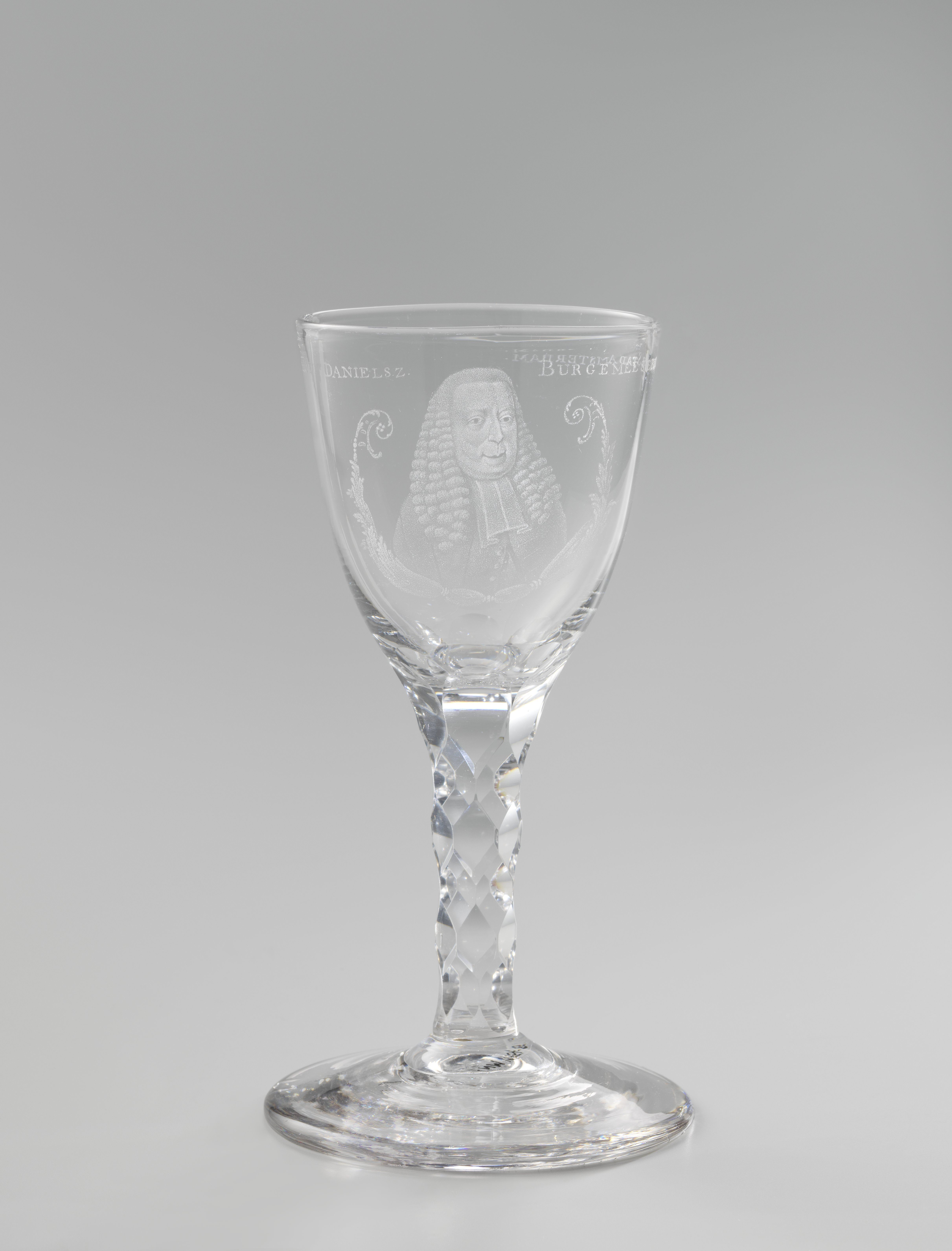
Wine glass engraved with a portrait of burgomaster Hendrik Danielsz Hooft (1716–1794) of Amsterdam.

During March the question remained in abeyance and the Patriots got themselves into a frenzy of politxal debates and petitions. On 3 April van Goudoever again approached the council, this time at the head of a deputation of 102 schutterij officers, to demand that henceforth the city would only be represented in the States of Holland by the two pensionaries of the city Engelbert François van Berckel and Carel Visscher, who were trusted by the Patriot rank-and-file. Dedel recognised that he had to act quickly if he did not want to lose control of the council. He secretly contacted the stadtholder at his Het Loo Palace, to try to achieve a political compromise that would enable Amsterdam to go over to the Orangist side, and to ask for the stadtholder's support in mobilizing the so-called Bijltjes (Note: The Bijltjes ("Little Axes") were laborers employed in the Amsterdam ship-building industry, who were strongly Orangist, and had been used in the past to foment mob violence to intimidate middle-class opponents of the stadtholderian regime.) to organize counter demonstrations and street riots. However, both the stadtholder and the Bijltjes were unreceptive to this secret approach. And on 20 April an incendiary pamphlet appeared on the Amsterdam streets, entitled Het Verraad Ontdekt ("Treason Unmasked"), disclosing the whole conspiracy. That evening the Patriot clubs were in a frenzy. The "Burgher Defense Council" (the effective leadership of the Free Corps) convened in the Doelen Hall to organize a monster petition (the so-called Act of Qualification) demanding the purge of the Council of the Dedel-faction, which garnered 16,000 signatures in one day. On 21 April this petition was presented while the Dam Square in front of the Amsterdam City Hall was filled with demonstrating armed citizens. Hooft now took the initiative to push the purge through: Dedel and his friends were voted out by the City Council. Amsterdam was now securely in Patriot hands.

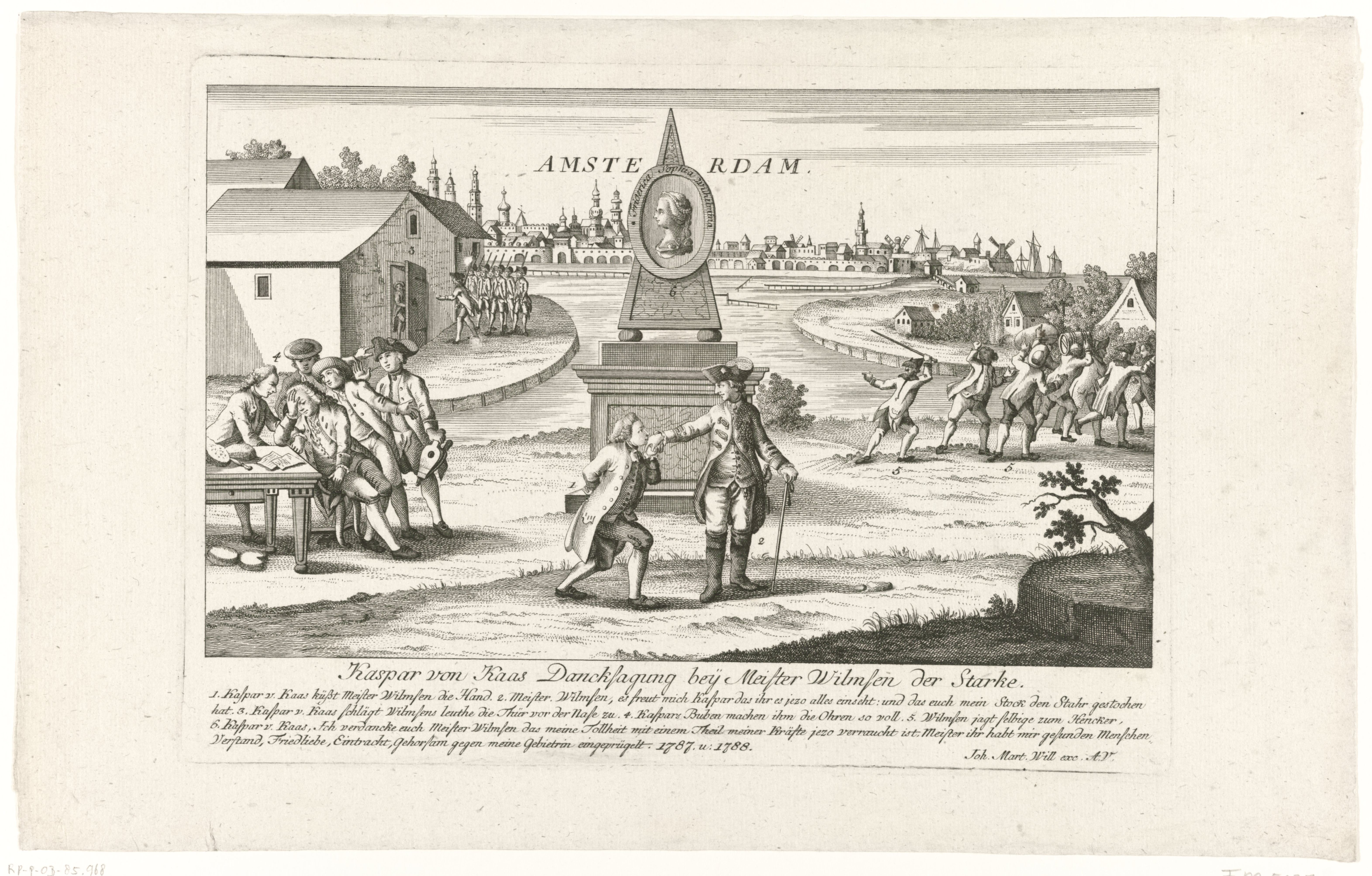
Cartoon about burgomaster Hendrik Danielsz Hooft, 1787, inspired by his dismissal.

After the Prussian invasion of Holland in September 1787, followed by the fall of Amsterdam on 10 October 1787, Hooft voluntarily resigned as burgemeester and member of the vroedschap together with such politicians as Gerrit de Graeff (II) van Zuid-Polsbroek. He remained a private citizen until his death in 1794. But that didn't mean that he abandoned politics. At first he went into voluntary exile until 1790. During this exile he became even more popular than before among the Patriot rank-and-file, who already had given him the honorific "Father Hooft". All kinds of objects were engraved with his likeness, like medals and wine glasses. After his return he made a tour of the Netherlands, visiting a number of Patriot strongholds where he was fêted by the people. He finally settled down with his sister Elisabeth, the widow of Wouter Valckenier, at her mansion Valk en Heining at Loenersloot. There his admirers came to visit him on his birthdays to drink his health. He died at Valk en Heining on 31 August 1794.
