= Quint Ondaatje =

Dutch patriot and revolutionary politician

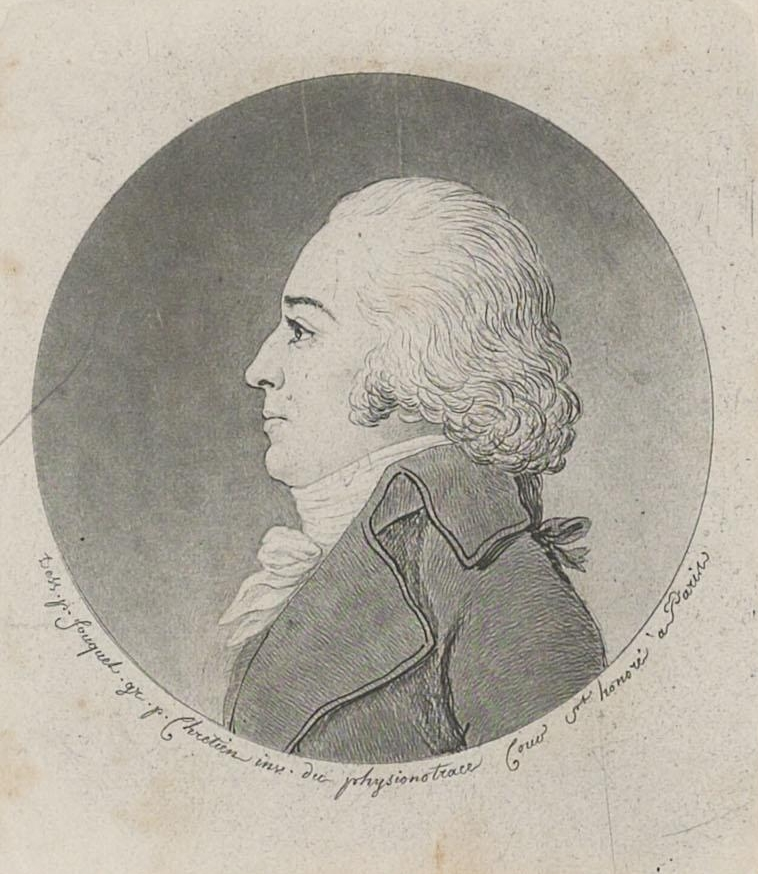
A physionotrace by Gilles-Louis Chrétien of Quint Ondaatje between 1793-1798

Pieter Philip Jurriaan Quint Ondaatje (born in Colombo, 18 June 1758 – died in Batavia, 30 April 1818) was an illustrious Dutch patriot and influential revolutionary politician at the end of the 18th century. Ondaatje is regarded as a pioneer of Dutch democracy. When Utrecht was besieged by States army troops he allied himself with Rhinegrave von Salm, entrusted with the defence Holland and Utrecht. At the end of 1787 he lived as refugee in Brussels and French Flanders. From 1795 he served the Batavian Republic and in 1806 the Kingdom of Holland. Up to the Hundred Days he worked in Paris.

== Life ==
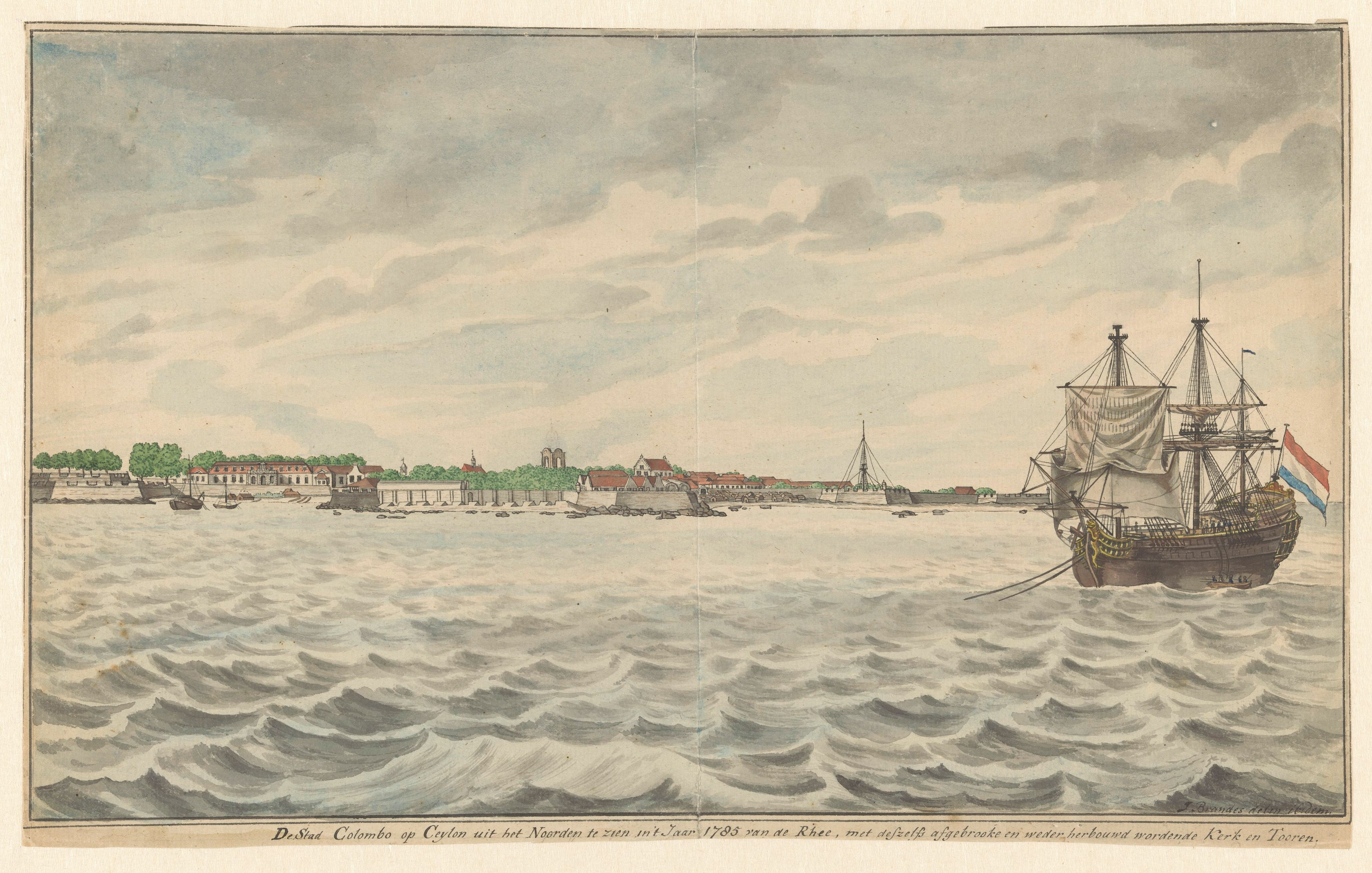
De Stad Colombo op Ceylon uit het Noorden te zien in 't Jaar 1785 van de Rhee, met deszelfs afgebrooke en weder herbouwd wordende Kerk en tooren

Ondaatje was the son of Willem Jurgen Ondaatje, a Protestant minister, with a dark complexion, attributed to his own father's and mother's (of respectively) Indian and Portuguese ancestry on the island of Ceylon, from the community known as "burghers". Ondaatje's grandfather, Dr Michael Juri Ondaatchi, was a Chetty (mixed Tamil and Sinhala) physician. His mother, Hermina Quint, hailed from Amsterdam where they married in 1757. In early 1758 the couple arrived at Ceylon where he was aligned to the Wolvendaal Church.

In 1774 Pieter arrived in Amsterdam, where he resided with his maternal grandfather, and became a pupil at the Athenaeum Illustre. In 1778 he relocated to Utrecht to pursue studies in law and theology but shifted his focus to philosophy. In November 1782 he received a degree in philosophy and successfully obtained his PhD from Leiden Law School in January 1787.

== Dutch Patriot ==
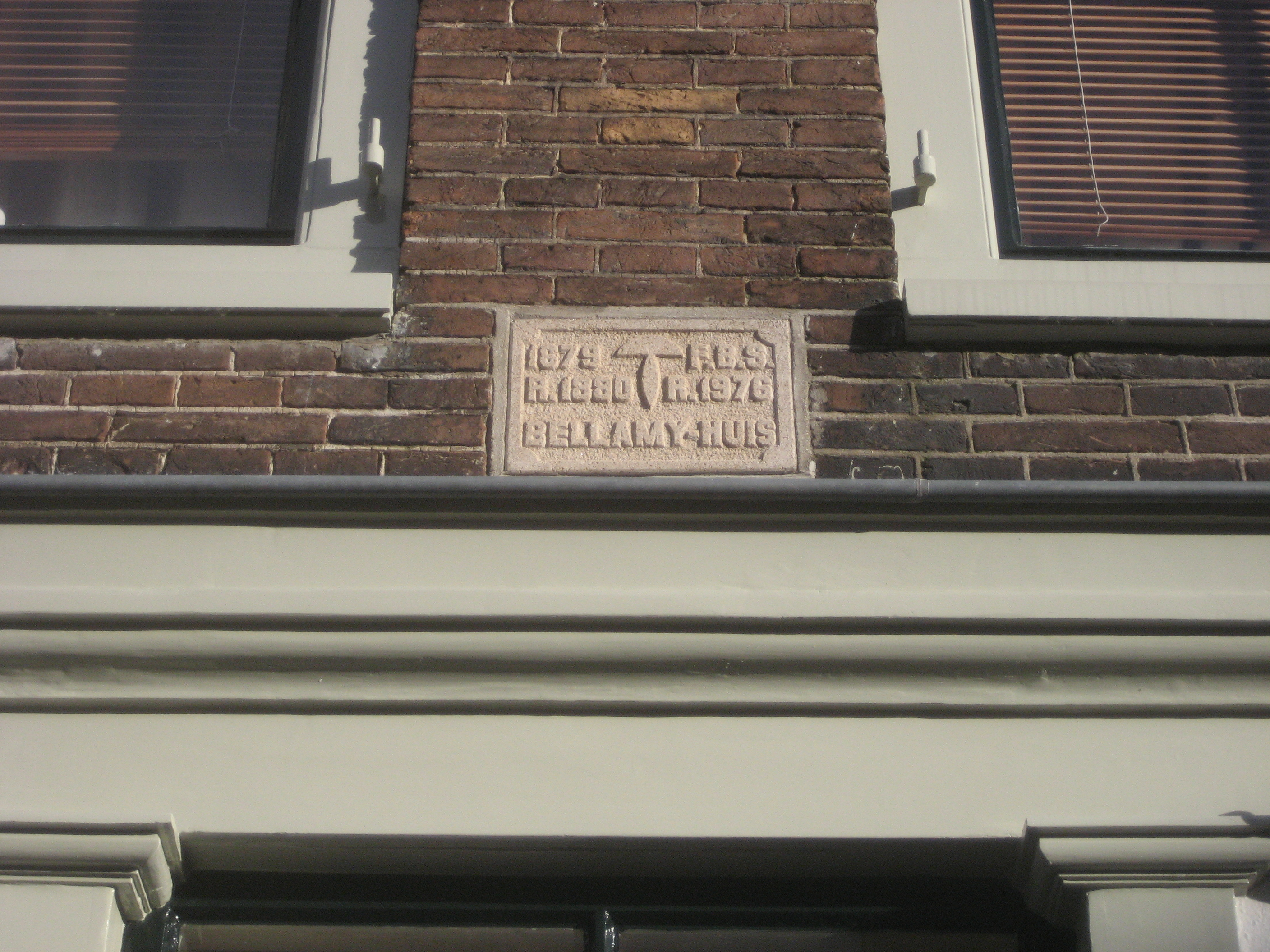
Bellamy-huis, Lange Nieuwstraat 18, Utrecht

In February 1783, influenced by Andrew Fletcher (patriot) and Van der Capelle tot den Pol, Ondaatje played a pivotal role as founder of the local Free corps, which aimed to supplant the orangist schutterij. During this time he was elected as officer and renting a room in the same house as the poet Jacobus Bellamy, who complained about the noisy gatherings in Ondaatje's quarters. In the same year nl:Rijklof Michaël van Goens, the principal mouthpiece of the Orangists, was removed from the oligarchic city council. Additionally, Ondaatje wrote petitions to the vroedschap regarding the rights and duties of the stadtholder concerning the selection of new candidates. On 6 December 1784, he managed to organize the Free corps nationally. Regular meetings were held in the "stadskelder". It committed the Free corps strive for a "Peoples' government by representation. As the leader of the negotiations, Ondaatje asserted to the magistrate the necessity of embracing the general will.

On 11 March 1785, the populace of Utrecht congregated at the town hall in a massive demonstration. Led by Ondaatje, they boldly entered the hall, where he delivered a passionate speech demanding the resignation of Orangist candidates unless the regenten acceded to their demands. Faced with this determined stance, the magistrates relented, on the condition that Ondaatje quell the unrest. Ondaatje proclaimed their triumph and urged the people to disperse to their homes. Though the crowd dispersed, subsequent gatherings were prohibited. On 3 May 1785, a complaint was filed against him, setting the stage for a trial scheduled on August 2, 1785. He defended himself against attacks in the patriot newspaper De Post van den Neder-Rhijn and was visited by Pieter Paulus, a public prosecutor from Rotterdam. Ondaatje made the decision to resign from his position in the Free corps and relinquish his role as their representative. After the second national meeting of Free corps in June 1785, it became increasingly clear that the Republic was heading for a civil war.

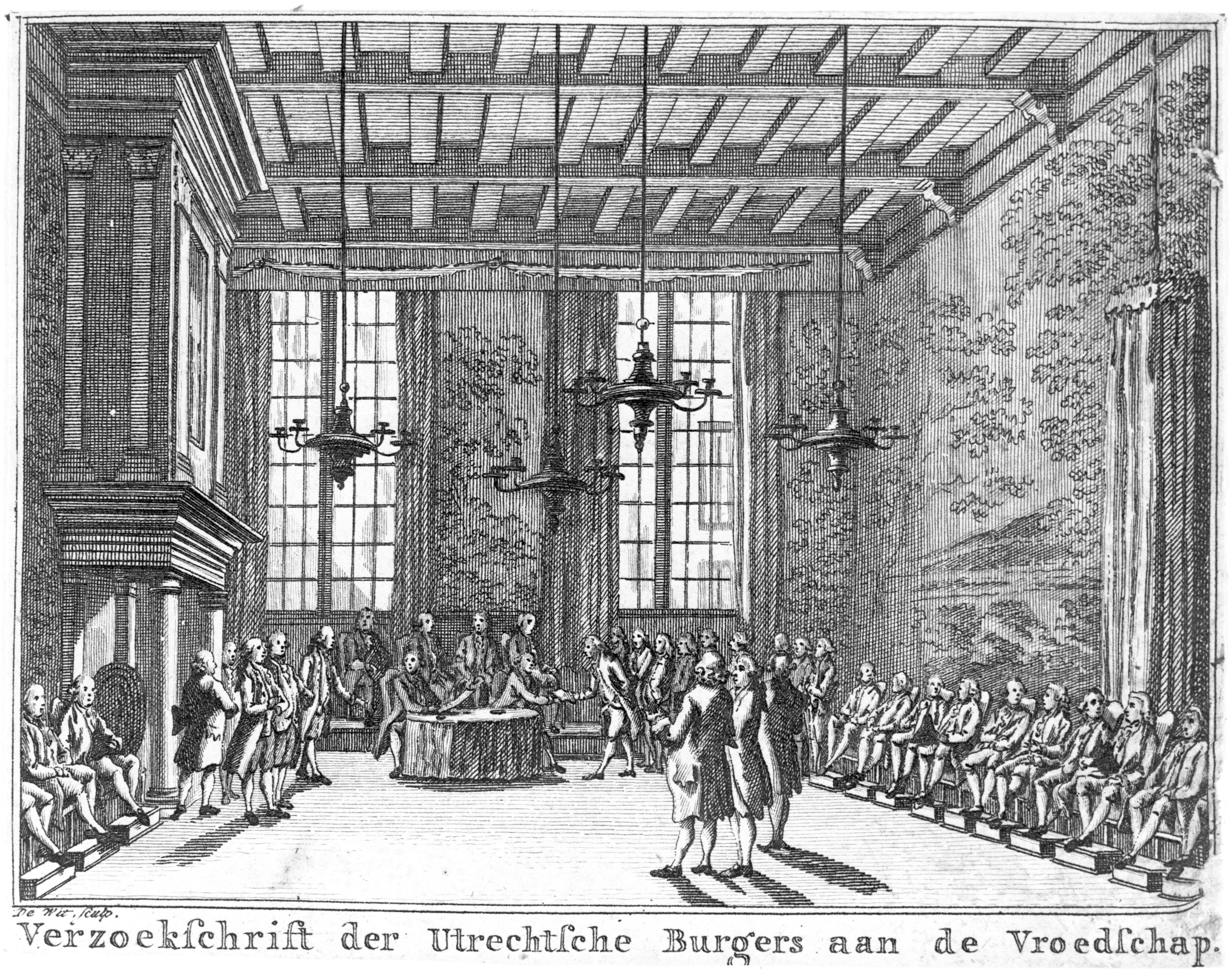
"Verzoekschrift der Utrechtsche Burgers aan de Vroedschap." (1783)

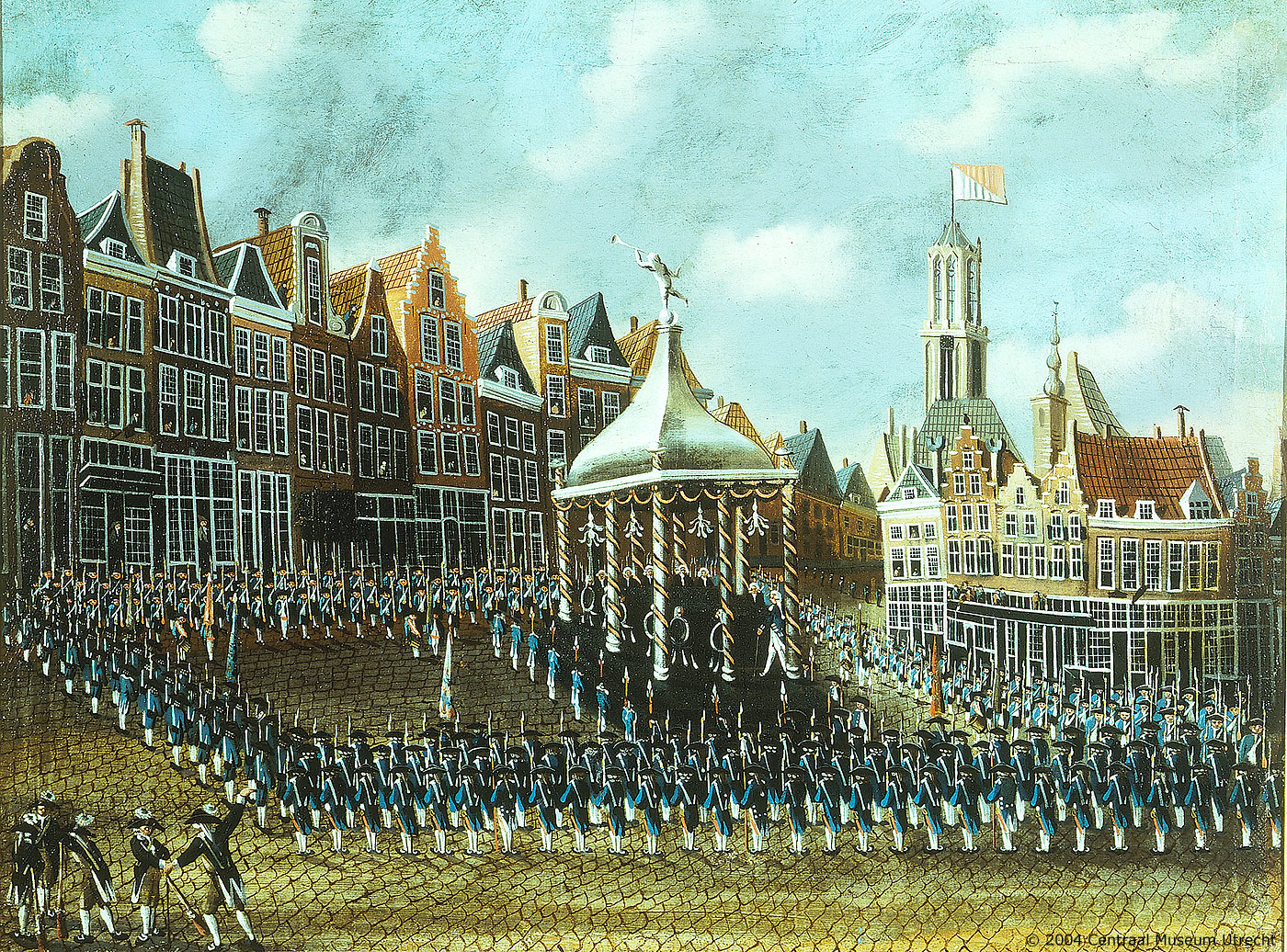
Patriots at the Neude on 12 October 1786, during the installation of an elected city council

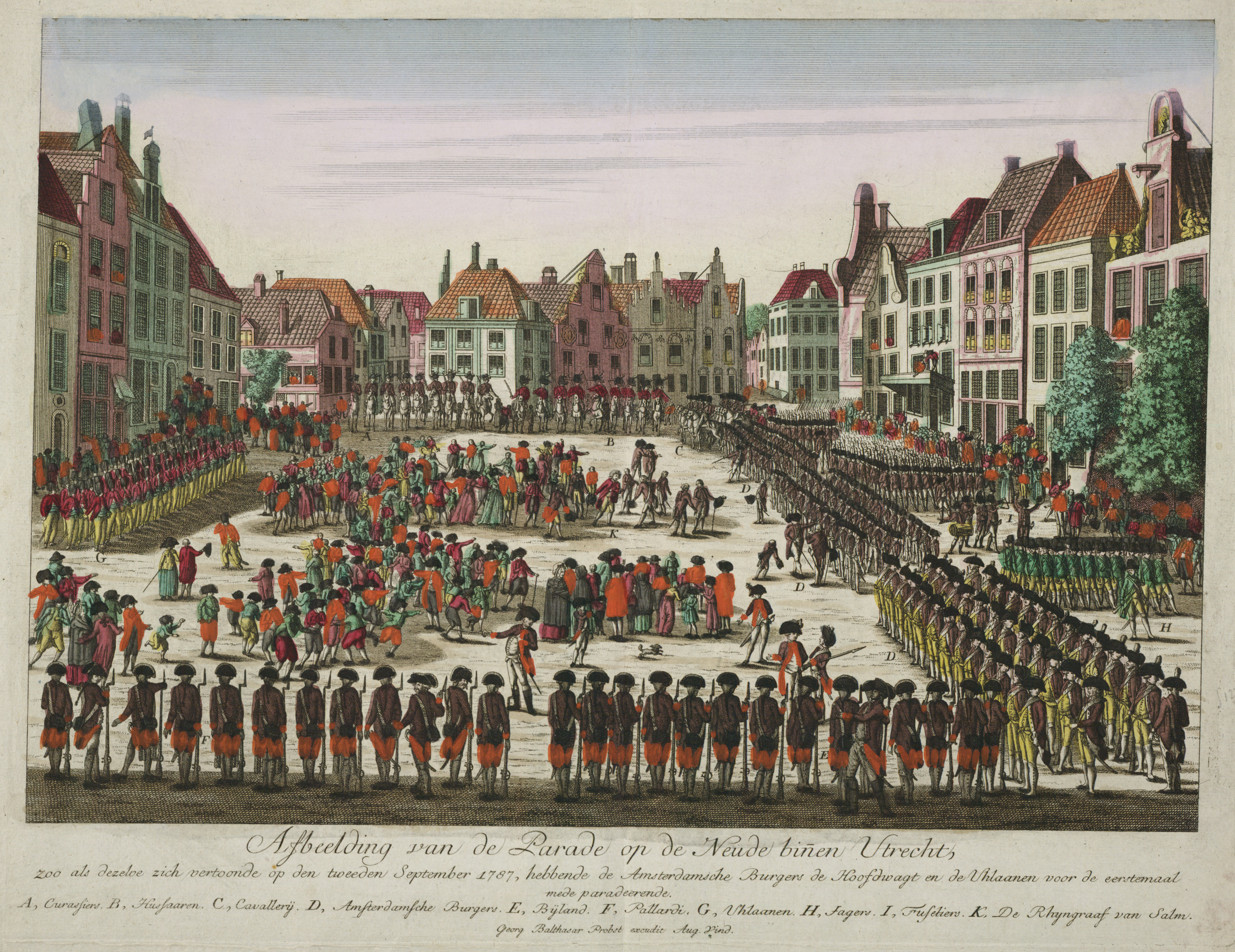
Parade of the exercitiegenootschappen and auxiliary troops in Utrecht on September 2, 1787.

By December 1785, tension in the city escalated further. Despite a vigorous campaign by the patriots advocating for the adoption of new democratic urban regulations, the council remained entrenched in traditional governance methods. Faced with this impasse, Ondaatje resolved to take decisive action. On 19 December, he successfully rallied a crowd and led them to the town hall, demanding that the city council implement the democratic regulations within three months. No one would be permitted to leave the building until they had consented to the Patriot's demands.

== Dutch Revolt ==
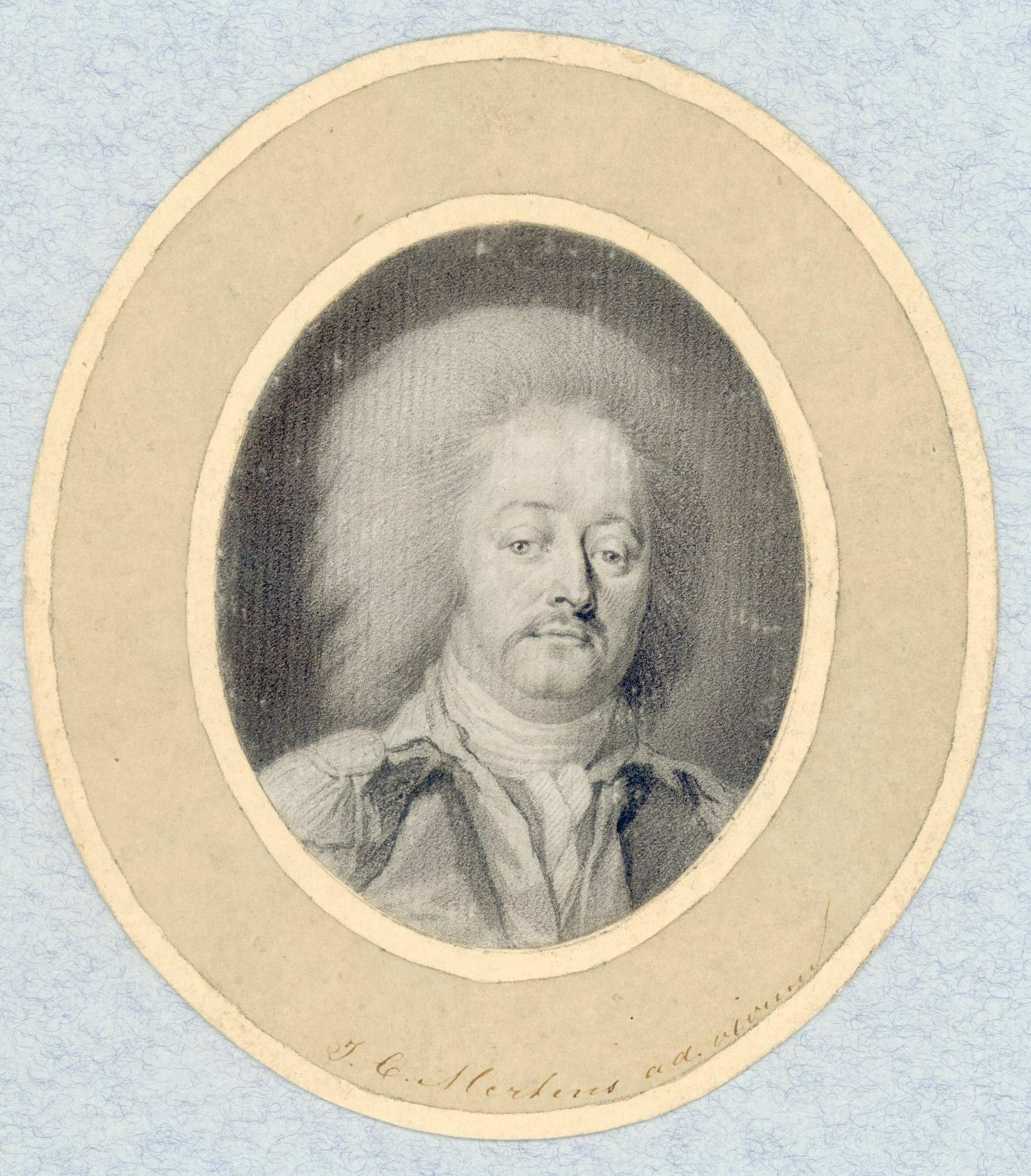
Likely Johann Friedrich of Salm-Grumbach, drawing by Johannes Cornelis Mertens (1752–1823).

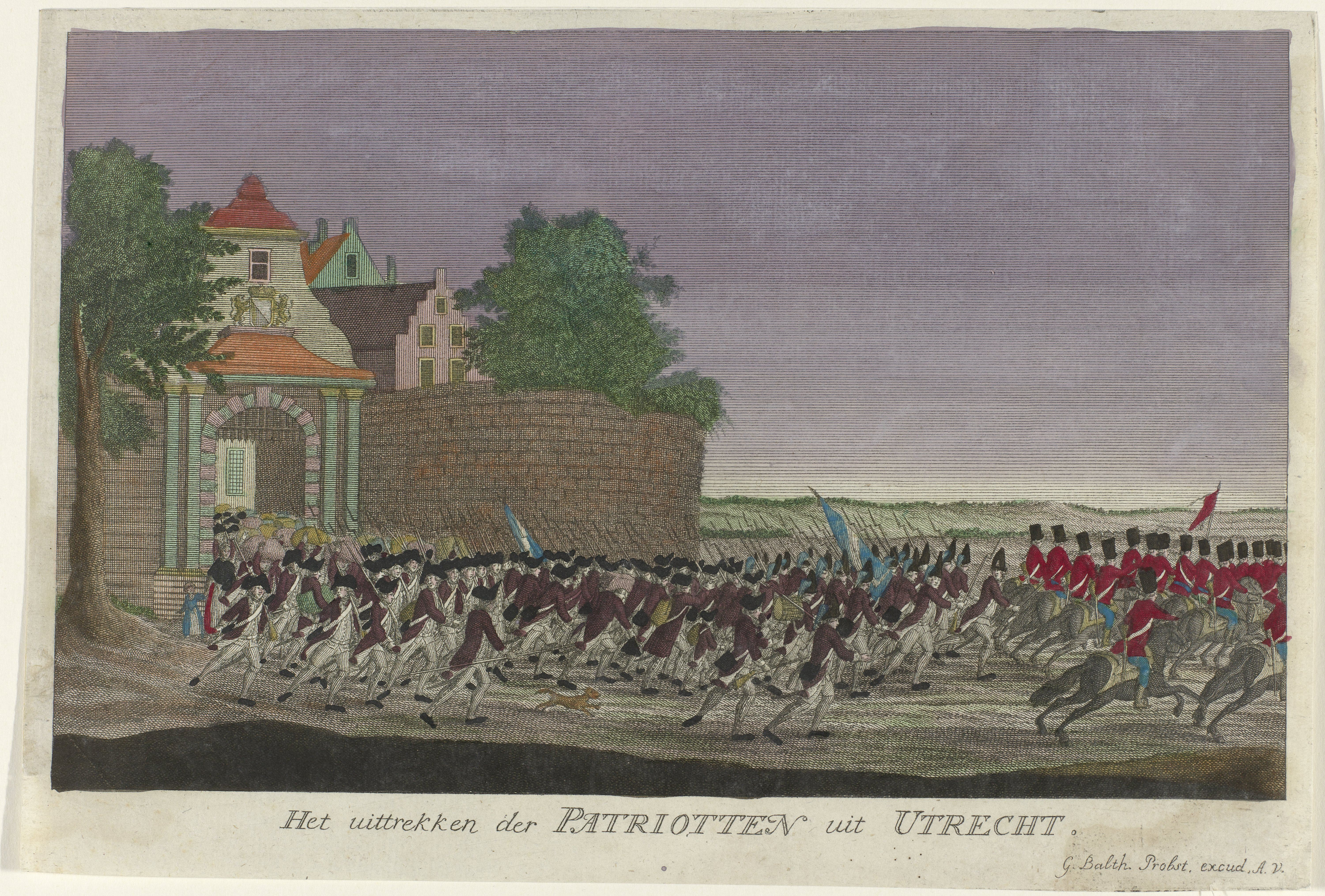
Troops of the Patriotten leave Utrecht late in the evening on Saturday, 15 September 1787

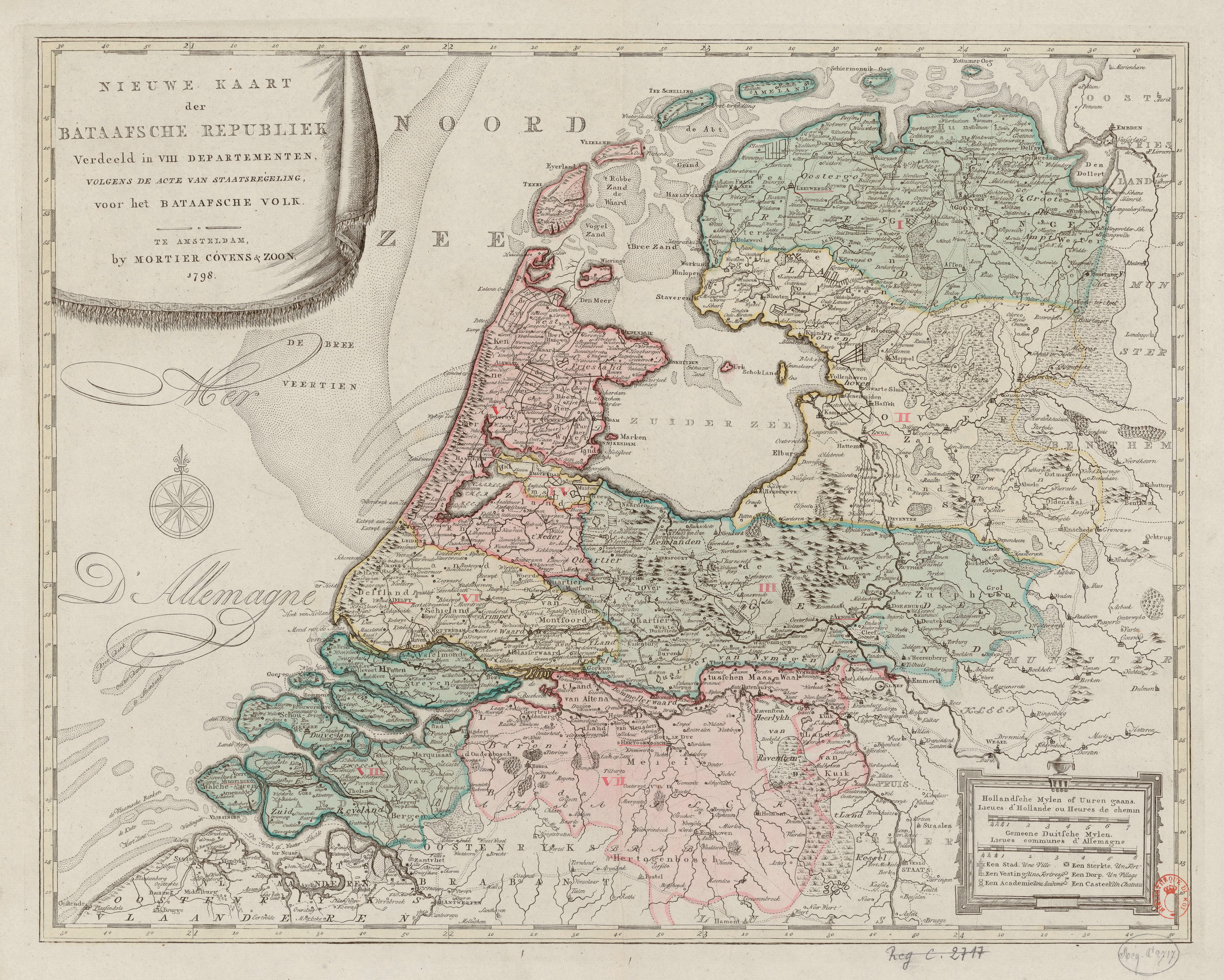
Map of the Batavian Republic in 1798 by Mortier Covens

Despite internal divisions, they agreed in early August 1786 that the city council should no longer be appointed by the stadtholder but by the Free corps and religion nor property a condition. Amidst intense public interest, the Utrecht city council was removed from power with only seven members retaining their positions. Within a matter of weeks, the free corps elected more patriotically inclined magistrates, who assumed office on 10 October. This marked a historic moment, as Utrecht became the first city in the Netherlands to establish a city government that included representation from Catholic, Mennonite, and other less privileged groups. This government was controlled by representatives of the population and, notably, operated without interference or permission from the Stadtholder. However, the Orangist majority in the provincial States refused to acknowledge these regulations and relocated to Amersfoort, while the Patriot minority remained in Utrecht. The city transformed into a fortified camp in anticipation of a potential attack by the stadtholder's forces, which were being organized from Amersfoort.

In May 1787, a total ban on the purchase of weapons was imposed, further infuriating the patriots. All this led to the establishment of the Defense Committee in Woerden to organize the defense of Holland and Utrecht. In the middle of the night Ondaatje arrived at the Battle of Jutphaas. On 7 June Ondaatje was appointed as liaison officer and Johann Friedrich von Salm-Grumbach as commander-in-chief. but was not recognized by all officers, his new powers were legally controversial. At the end of July Salm made an attempt conquering Palace Soestdijk and besieging Amersfoort. In August 60 French gunners arrived in the city of Utrecht.

Things really got exciting when a Prussian ultimatum came into effect but Holland refused to give in. On 13 September a Prussian invasion of Holland took place; about 18,000 Prussian soldiers, in three divisions, crossed the border. In the night of 15 September the Salm-légion, Ondaatje and his armed volunteers and supporters left Utrecht and fled in the direction of Ouderkerk aan de Amstel. Ondaatje destroyed the mutual correspondence between the members of the Defense Committee in Woerden.

Around 2 October he (and the Rhinegrave?) fled to Hamburg but Ondaatje returned mid November (with bad weather) to Ostend. In 1789 he was condemned for Lèse-majesté and declared publicly infamous. The formation of a union between the Republic and the Belgian region was a topic in which Ondaatje was interested, having withdrawn to Ghent with Von Liebeherr in 1790. He settled in Dunkirk as author and printer. In 1791 Ondaatje wrote an apology to the Rijngraaf of Salm. He added Quint to his last name on request of his late grandfather.

Meanwhile Ondaatje was active in fraternal organisations (Free masons). For him the Rights of Man came first and he laid emphasis on freedom of speech and the people's sovereignty. In July 1792 Ondaatje sought help from Johan Valckenaer and Court Lambertus of Beyma and proposed the formation of a Batavian Legion, assisting in an invasion into the Dutch Republic by general Dumouriez. On 17 February 1793, the French troops and the Batavian Legion crossed the border; Ondaatje was present during the Siege of Breda by Westermann, occupied by an army of Sans-Culottes that lacked almost everything. In March the Armée du Nord was ordered to return to Brussels rather than further entering Holland. From September 1793 Ondaatje was active in Calais as a printer. In the following year he married Christina Hoevenaar, who divorced J.C. Hespe, another revolutionary printer. After the Batavian Revolution they moved to the Hague.

== Batavian Republic ==
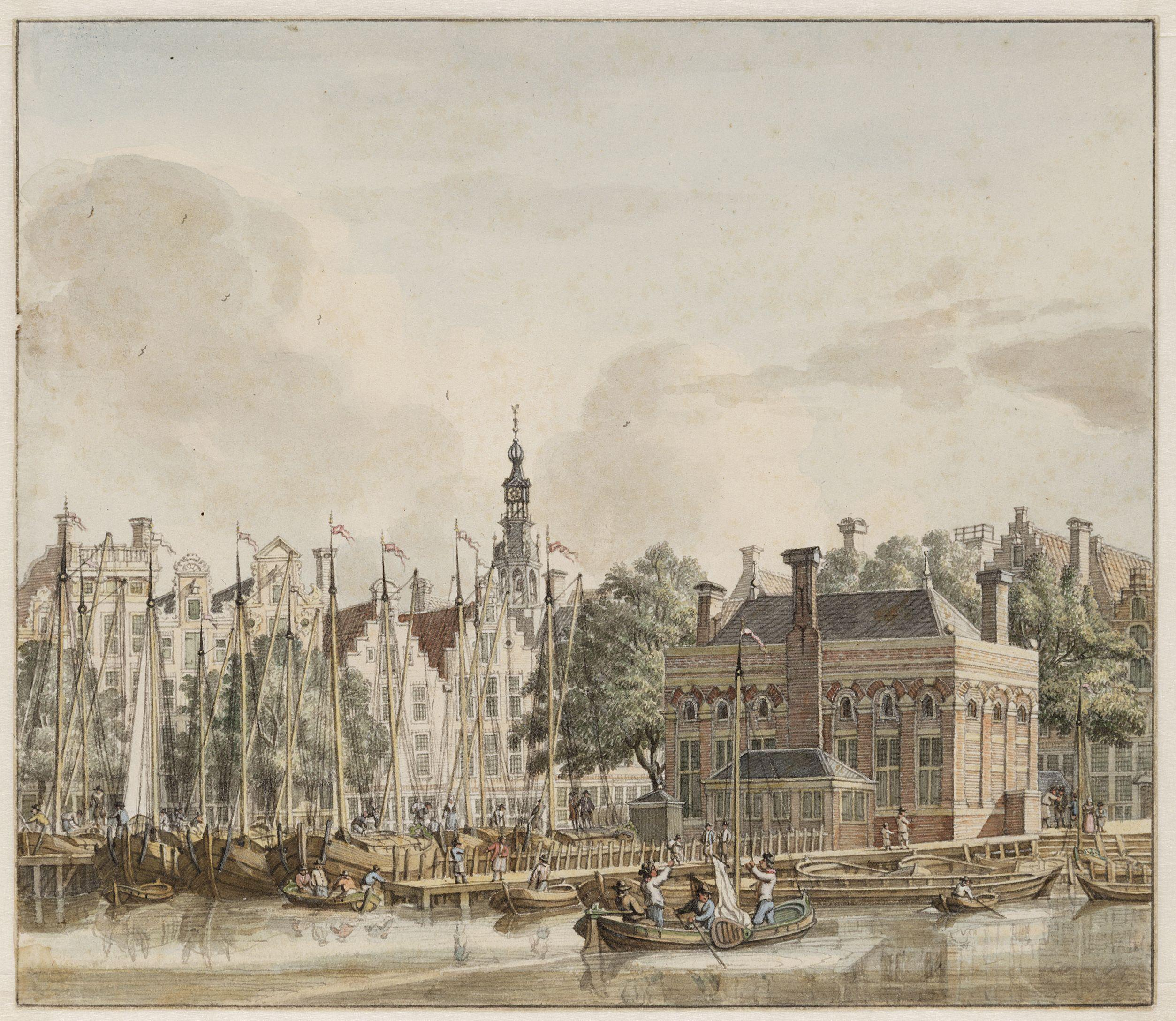
Ondaatje worked at Zeerecht, print by Jan de Beijer

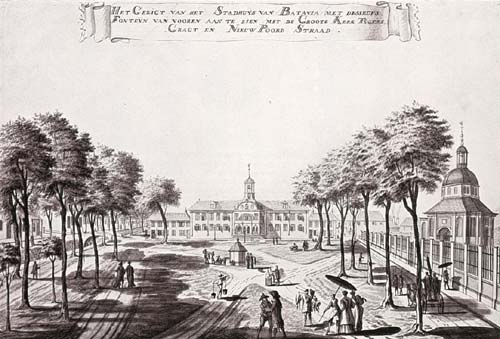
Drawing of the city hall (Dutch: stadhuis) in Batavia (by Danish painter Johannes Rach, late 18th century)

In March 1796, Ondaatje, alongside Samuel Wiselius, Wybo Fijnje, Theodorus van Kooten, and Bogislaus von Liebeherr, was appointed to the Committee tasked with dissolving the Dutch East India Company. As he spoke Portuguese he was sent on a journey to Portugal, aiming to safeguard the East Indian return fleet, which had entered Saint Ubes laden with valuable merchandise, from English interception. In January 1797, he met with Johan Valckenaer in Madrid and returned via Paris.

He was residing at Oudezijds Voorburgwal, close to Zeerecht when he buried one of his children at Oudezijds Kapel. As a propagator of the unitary state he contributed to producing a map delineating the new territorial division of the Batavian Republic. Under the Staatsbewind, he obtained a financial position as "solliciteur" within the Navy, which he maintained until 1804. He served Louis Bonaparte in the Council of Finance until his Kingdom of Holland was absorbed into France.

In 1811, Ondaatje was appointed at the Prize court in Paris which was dissolved in January 1815. During the Hundred Days he had a meeting with William I of the Netherlands. Upon his return he faced criticism due to his past affiliations. In February 1815, he and Von Liebeherr sought appointment to the Council of Justice in Batavia. To end the British interregnum in the East Indies the Dutch dispatched a fleet in October to restore Dutch administration on Java in accordance with the terms of the Treaty of Paris. The fleet reached its destination on 19 May 1816, and after three months, the British governor consented with establishing three Commissioners-General of the Dutch East Indies. Meanwhile, on 31 March 1816, Ondaatje, Liebeherr and other designated officials, embarked from Vlissingen. Within a few days the Nassau ran aground on the Flemish coast. As a result, it sustained a leak and was forced to dock in Rio de Janeiro. The crew was in good condition but at some time Ondaatje had suffered a stroke. After six months the frigate arrived at Banten. By July 1817 he was no longer able to fulfill his duties on (the second floor of) the colonial townhall and was sent home. Following the death of her parents the youngest daughter Hermina Wilhelmina relocated to Ceylon in 1860 and three years later to Jersey.

== Sources ==
- Information on Ondaatje by his descendant Michael P.J. Ondaatje
- Hulzen, A. van (1966) Utrecht in de patriottentijd, p. 66, 125-128.
- Wilschut, A. (2000) Goejanverwellesluis. De strijd tussen patriotten en prinsgezinden, 1780-1787, p. 41-3, 51.
