= Isaac van Goudoever =

Dutch schutterij colonel

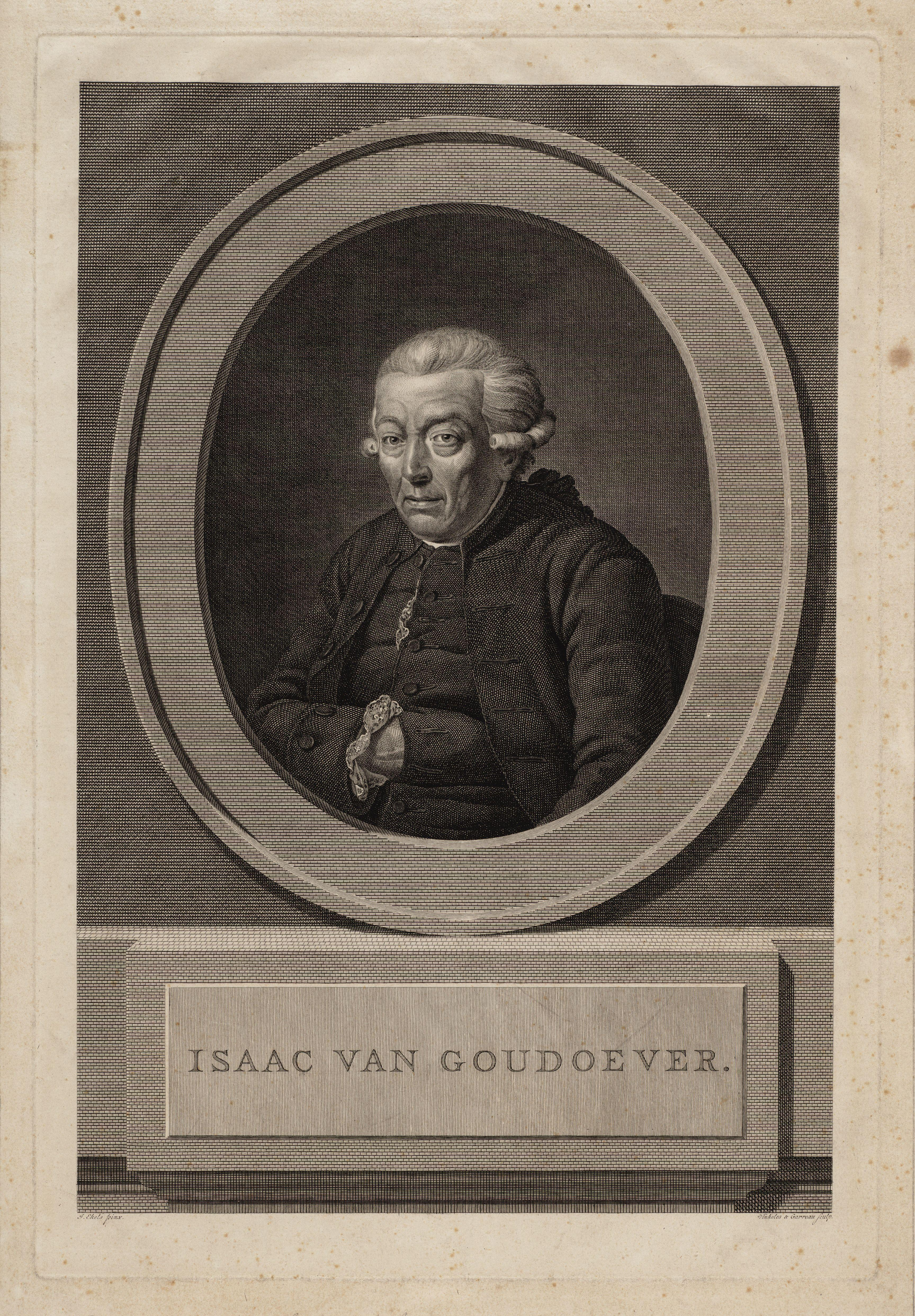
Isaac van Goudoever by Reinier Vinkeles

Isaac van Goudoever (before 20 October 1720 (Note: Van der Aa gives 20 October 1720 as the birth date, but Van Loon contradicts him explicitly, giving 29 August 1712 as the birth date, quoting a source who knew Van Goudoever personally; Cf. Van Loon, p. 342, note 2. But both are wrong. First of all, the parents were married in 1714 in Amersfoort, which makes it unlikely that the son was born in 1712. Furthermore, though van Goudoever appears several times in the baptism, marriage and burial (DTB) register of Amsterdam, there is no baptism record for him there. However, there is a baptism record for him for 20 October 1720 in Amersfoort. Cf. "Isaac van Goudoever". Genealogieonline.) in Amersfoort – 11 September 1793 (Note: Cf. Van Loon, p. 346; The date of burial is 17 September 1793 according to DTB Amsterdam 1066, pp. 110-111) in Amsterdam) was a colonel of the Amsterdam schutterij who in April 1787 played a leading role in the conversion of the Amsterdam vroedschap to the cause of the Patriot faction in the Patriottentijd.

== Personal life ==
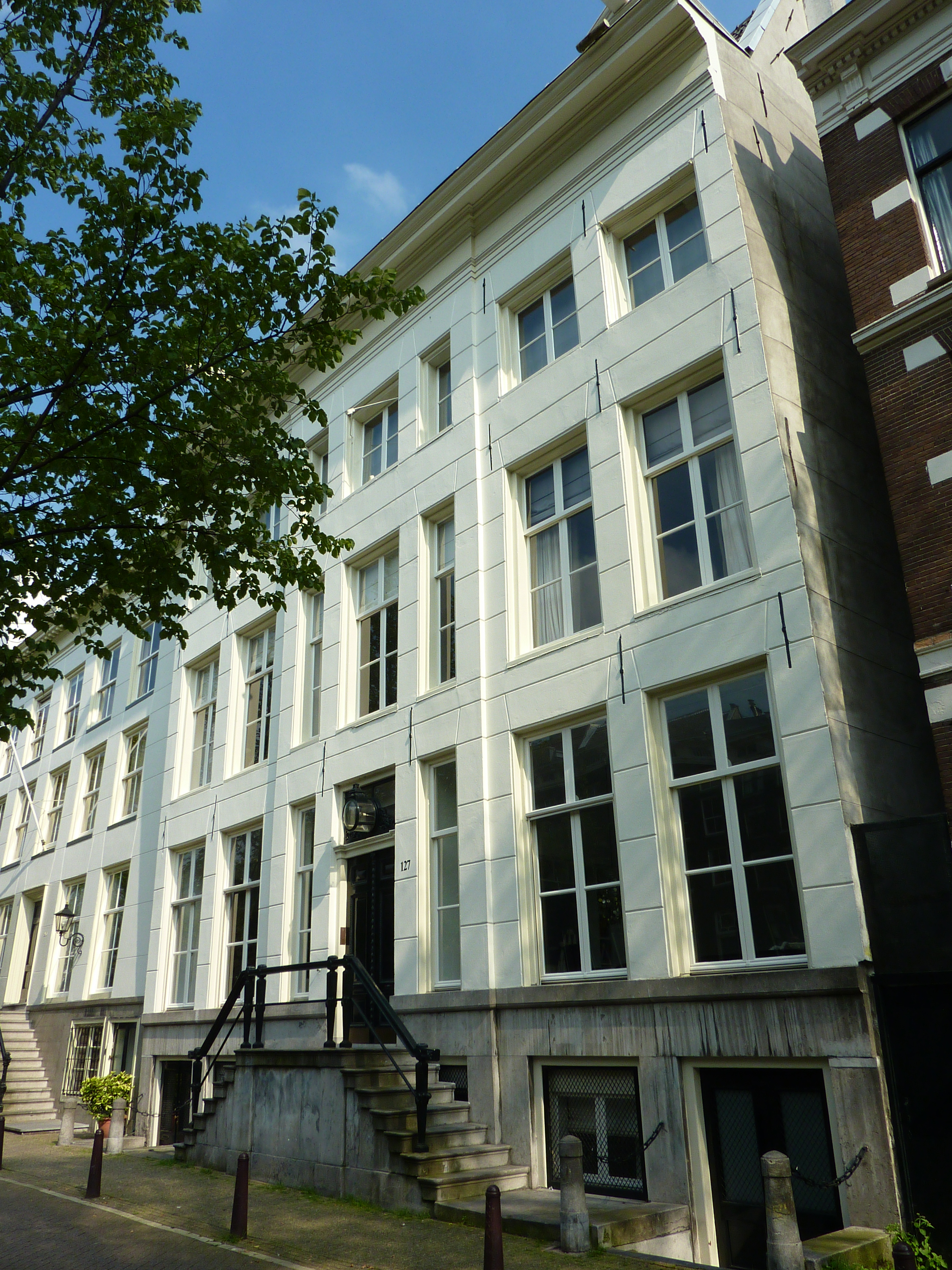
Herengracht 127

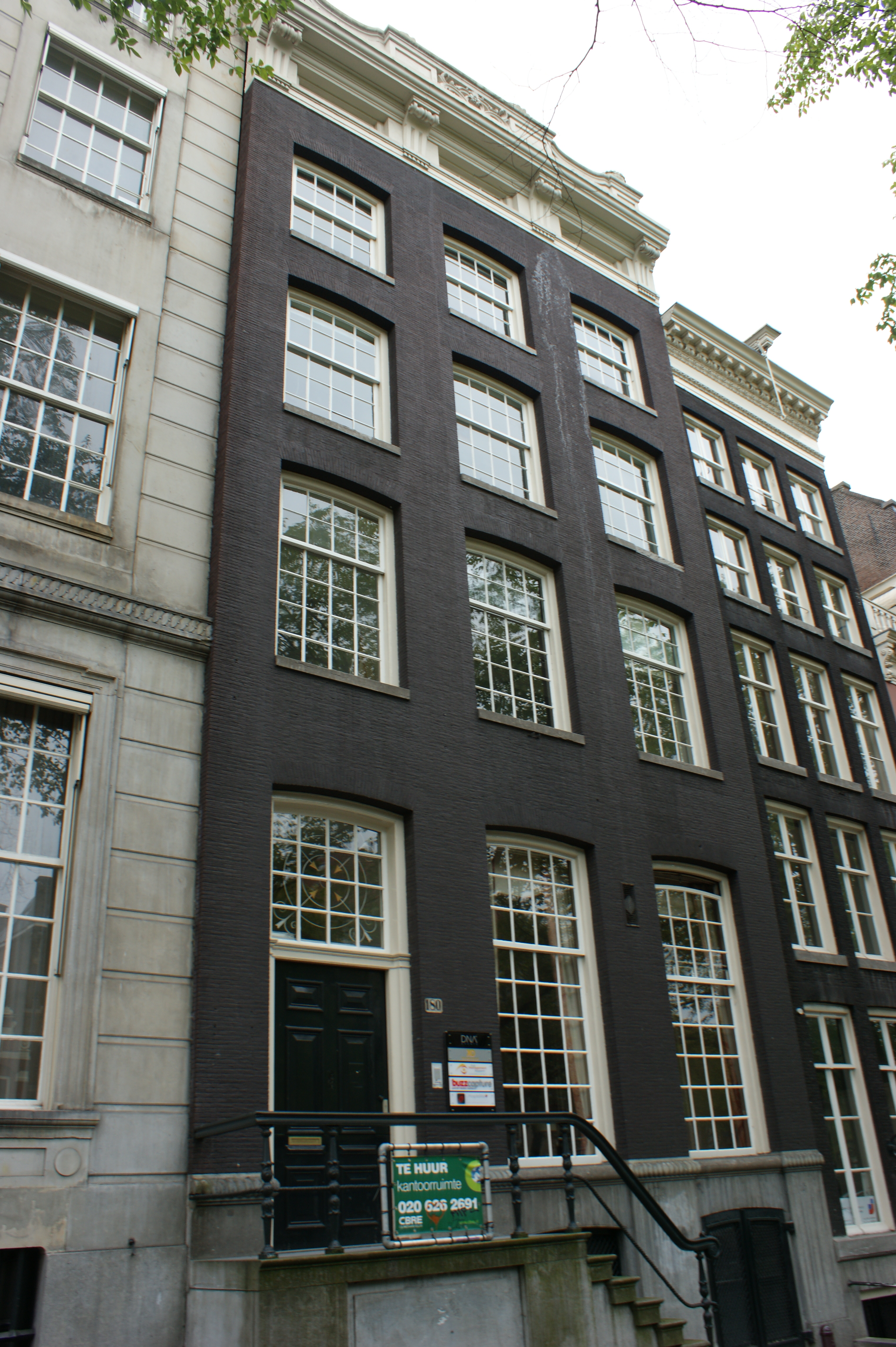
Herengracht 180

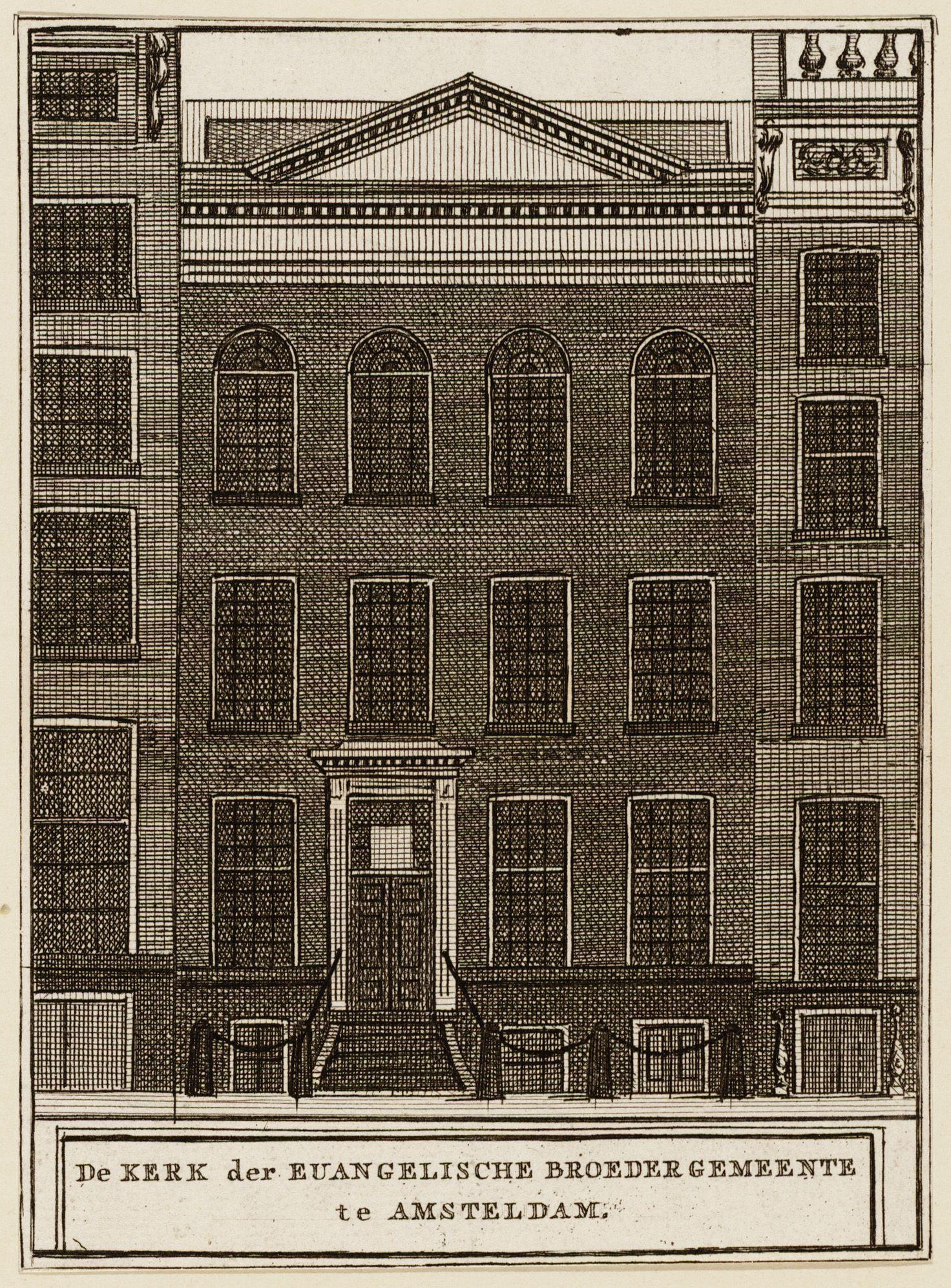
Schultsz, Johan Christoffel (1749-1812), Herengracht 248

Van Goudoever was the son of the wine merchant Hendrik van Goudoever and Anna van Drakenburg. He was married on 8 May 1749 to Agneta Ermina de Lange. (Note: According to Van Loon, who writes that this marriage produced two daughters, that did not survive; Cf. Van Loon, p. 342, though he misspells the first name as "Agatha"; the rest is confirmed by DTB Amsterdam 592, p.289. Unfortunately, Van der Aa muddies the waters again by mentioning a marriage to one Catahrina van Lancom, but this turns out to be a different Isaac van Goudoever.) They lived at various addresses on the Herengracht in Amsterdam: No. 127 between 1749 and 1760; No. 180 between 1760 and 1778; and No. 248 after 1778.

== Career ==
Van Goudoever followed his father in the wine import business. He became a wealthy citizen of Amsterdam, which qualified him to become a captain of the Amsterdam schutterij in 1752. He retired from the wine business in 1781. He had already been promoted to colonel in the schutterij (a part-time volunteer job) in 1773, leading the "white" regiment. (Note: The regiments of the Amsterdam schutterij were designated by colors; Cf. Van Loon, p. 342, note 5) Only in September 1786 (during the crisis around the occupation of the Patriot towns of Hattem and Elburg by the Dutch States Army, commanded by stadtholder William V) became Van Goudoever politically active for the first time, leading a deputation of officers of his regiment to the city government to assure them that they would loyally follow orders of that government "to prevent such violent attacks from happening in Amsterdam" (disingenuously begging the question if the city government would support the action of the stadtholder). The Patriots understood that it was important to get the Krijgsraad (Council of War) of the schutterij on their side, and Van Goudoever did his best to engineer this by demanding that a so-called Grote Krijgsraad (Great Council of War) would be constituted, consisting of not only the five colonels, but also the 60 captains and 60 lieutenants. This was opposed by the four other colonels, but Van Goudoever obtained the same objective (probably on the instigation of the Patriot burgemeester Hendrik Daniëlsz Hooft) by simply leading 60 officers (mostly lieutenants) to the session of the city council on 21 February 1787 in the City Hall, where they were discussing the question whether Amsterdam would agree to having the so-called "Legion of Salm" (Note: A "private army" of the States of Holland, led by the Rhinegrave of Salm.) move to The Hague, the seat of both the States of Holland and the States General of the Netherlands. The officers presented a petition, supporting the proposal under discussion, which was read out loud by captain Gales, the right hand of Van Goudoever. The matter was also discussed in the krijgsraad, which happened to convene on the same day. This led to a long debate that had not concluded at the end of the day. Captain Gales then proposed that the krijgsraad would reconvene on 21 March, but the majority of the colonels rejected this. They then departed, but van Goudoever forced the secretary of the krijgsraad, Backer, to enter in the minutes that the next session would be convened on 21 March.

This first "illegal" step was the first of many, which would lead to a conflict within the schutterij with the four other colonels, and with the city government. To convene the meeting of the krijgsraad on 21 March van Goudoever needed the permission of the city government, which was refused. The four other colonels on 15 March asked the Hof van Holland to intervene against the faction around van Goudoever (which consisted of 40 captains, 40 lieutenants, and 32 ensigns), which prompted him to move their dismissal in the krijgsraad on 15 April "because they had asked an external court to intervene in an internal matter." Before that happened the rump-krijgsraad had on 21 March already convened in the so-called Garnalendoelen (a tavern located at the Garnalenmarkt). They illegally appointed 16 new officers, and also refused to seat a new secretary, appointed by the city council to replace secretary Backer, who had resigned. When the city council refused to recognize the appointment, the rump-krijgsraad took it upon themselves to administer the oath of office to the new officers. They also appointed the lawyer Cuperus as their secretary.

Meanwhile, van Goudoever and his insurrectionist officers had several times visited the City Hall with their demands. On 26 February they had forced their way into the antechamber of the room where the vroedschap was in session to discuss the proposal to allow the "Legion of Salm" to move to The Hague. At that occasion old burgemeester Hooft had to climb on a chair to calm the agitated officers down. The encroachment so shocked the majority of the council that burgemeester Dedel moved to reject the proposal under discussion. Van Goudoever's intervention had proved counterproductive, in other words. Then on 3 April van Goudoever returned with 102 officers to demand that henceforth only the two pensionaries of the city van Berckel and Visscher, would be allowed to represent the city in the States of Holland. Again Dedel expressed his indignation.

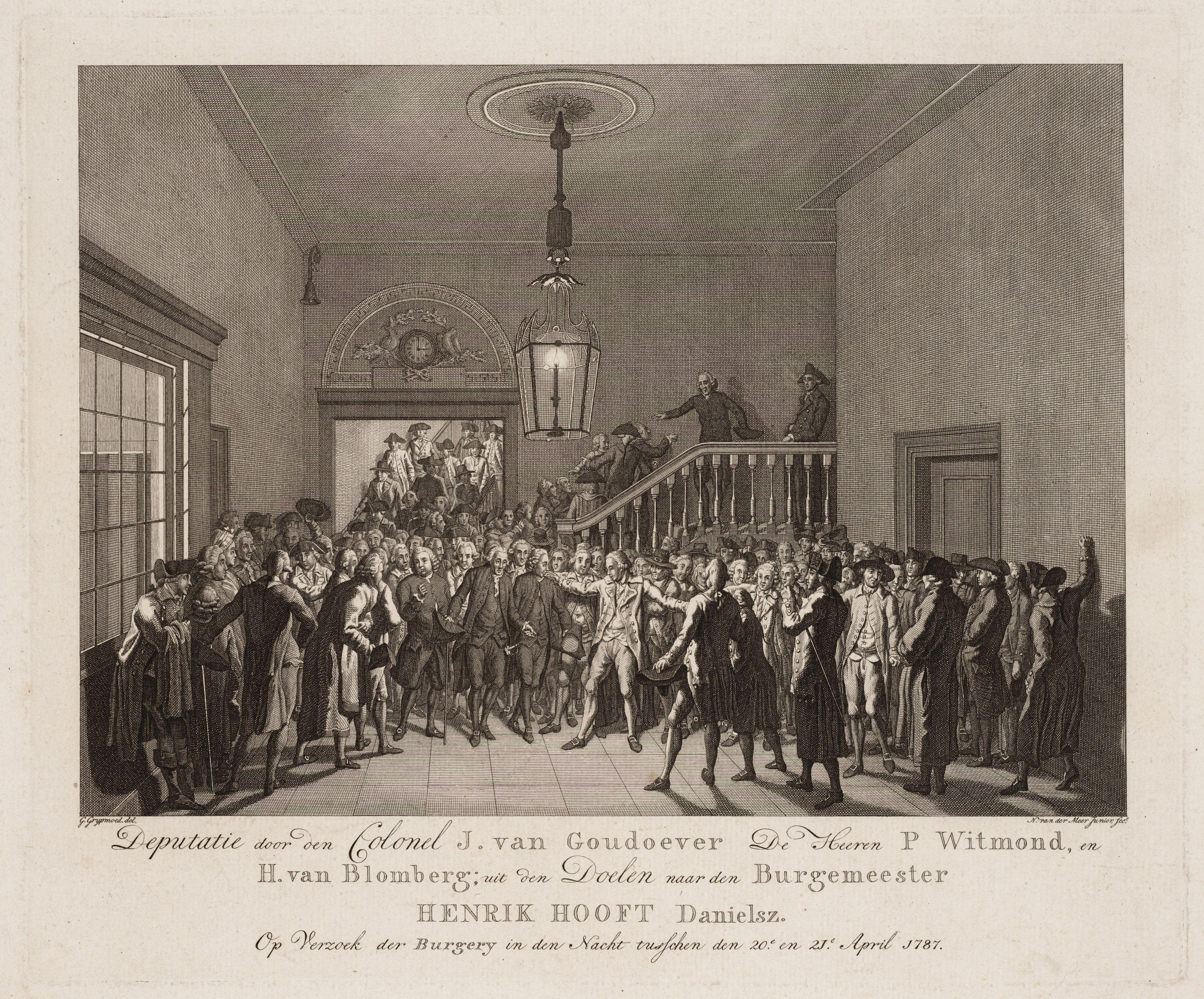
Departure of a deputation to burgemeester Hooft, led by Isaac van Goudoever, in the night of 20–21 April 1787, by Noach van der Meer (II)

But van Goudoever was not impressed. The next day he convened another meeting of the krijgsraad, where the four other colonels refused to appear. This was sufficient ground for van Goudoever to propose their dismissal from the schutterij on 18 April and their replacement with four new colonels, this time with Patriot sympathies. Thirteen captains resigned in protest, and this more or less completed the conversion of the officer corps of the Amsterdam schutterij to the Patriot cause.

After this van Goudoever apparently took a less active role, leaving the actual Coup d'état of 20–21 April, in which the faction around Dedel was purged from the city government, to the younger officers and burgemeester Hooft. (His right hand captain Gales received his reward when he was promoted to Lieutenant-Colonel on 13 June). Nevertheless, van Goudoever remained president of the krijgsraad until the Prussian invasion of Holland in September, and the fall of the city on 10 October. He was dismissed on 23 October from his office of colonel of the schutterij.

He survived his brief moment of fame for six more years, until he died in Amsterdam on 11 September 1793. He was buried in the Oudezijds Kapel on 17 September 1793.

== Sources ==
- Aa, A.J. van der (1862). "Goudoever (Isaak van) in: Biographisch Woordenboek der Nederlanden, deel 7". Resources Huygens ING (in Dutch). p. 315.
- Loon, G. van (1865). "Beschrijving van nederlandsche historie-peningen". Google Books (in Dutch). F. Muller. pp. 341–346.
