= Jean de Neufville =

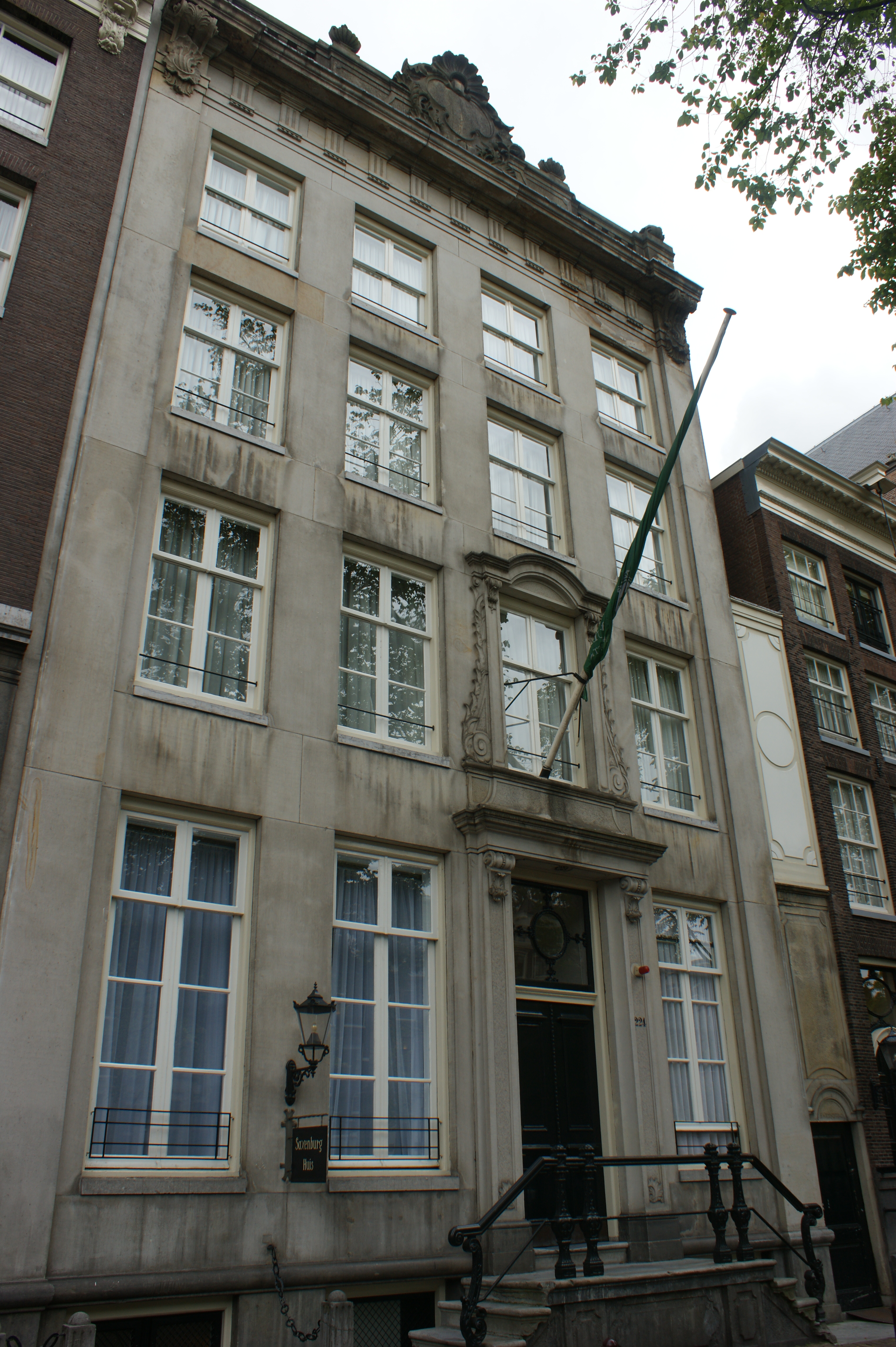
Saxenburg, Keizersgracht 224

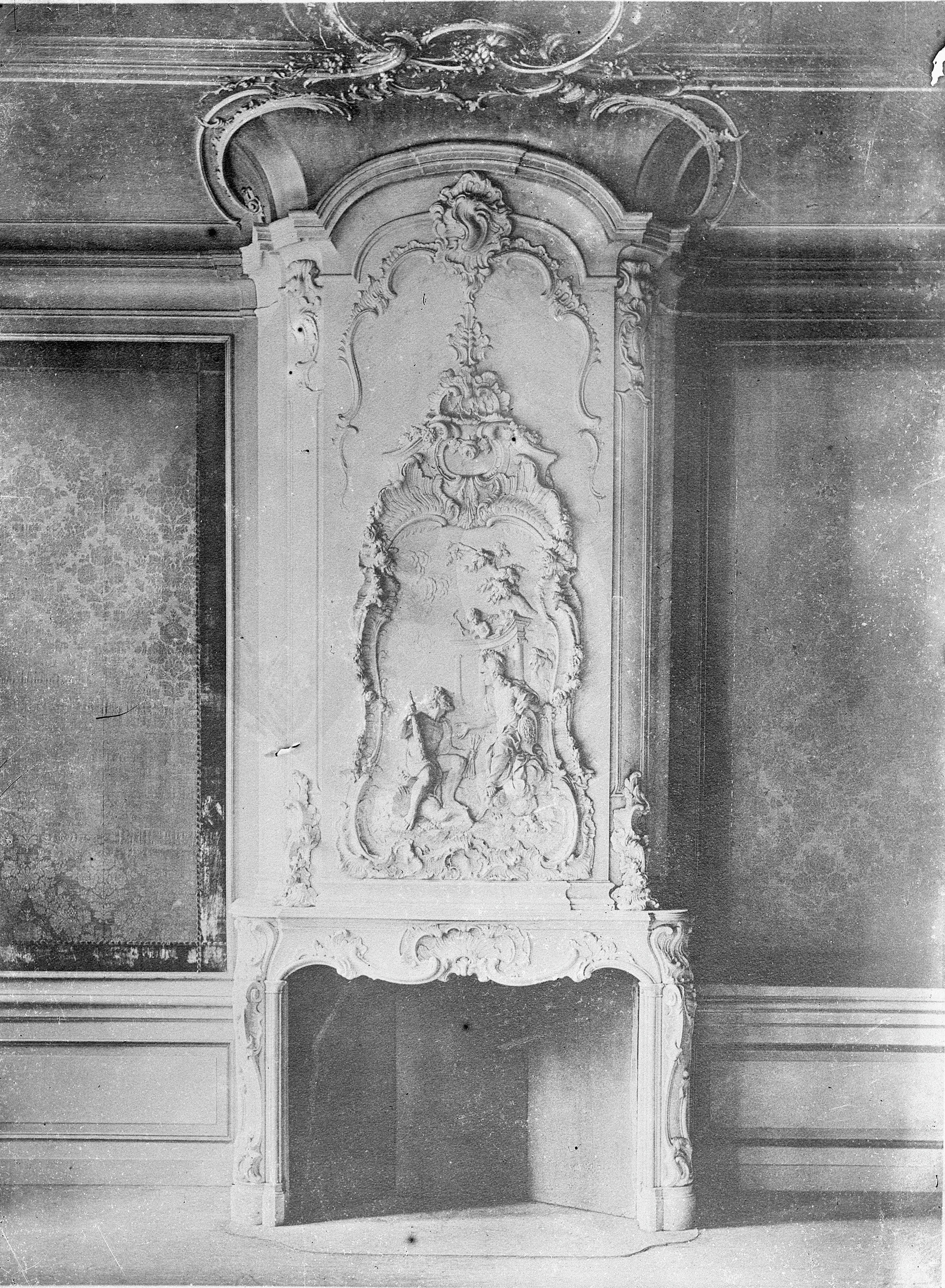
Chimney piece in Keizersgracht 224

Jean de Neufville or John de Neufville (Amsterdam, May 25, 1729 - Cambridge, Massachusetts, in December 1796) was an Amsterdam banker who had a meeting in Aachen on September 4, 1778 with US William Lee, a diplomat.

== Biography ==
Jean was the son of Leendert de Neufville Jansz (1698-1762) and Agneta de Wolff (1703-1750), who inherited from her mother Catharina de Neufville 350,000 guilders when she was 27. Their son Jean, a Mennonite, married in 1753 to Cornelia de Neufville (-1777) from Haarlem. In 1755 his son Leendert was born. (Jean had a cousin Leendert Pieter de Neufville who went bankrupt in 1763.) In 1765 Neufville bought a canal house, Keizersgracht 224 which he rebuilt. In 1776 he bought an estate, called Wester-Amstel.

De Neufville traded on the West-Indies. Already in 1761 he did business in America. In 1768 he started a cotton printery. In 1773 he bought coffee and sugar plantations in Suriname; he sold his part in 1778. In 1779 he began to direct shipping of goods (including weapons) to the US.; France had already started doing so two years earlier. One of the guests he received in his house, was John Paul Jones, a prominent figure during the Revolutionary War. De Neufville bought 7326 acres in South Carolina and his son in Albany County, New York. In September 1780 the Mercury on its way to the Dutch Republic was seized by the British near Newfoundland. The draft treaty of 1778, stored in a lead coffin, was thrown overboard by Henry Laurens, a native of South Carolina. Laurens had the mission to borrow 10 million guilders in the Republic. The British ambassador Sir Joseph Yorke demanded satisfaction. The previously closed secret agreement between American diplomat and Virginian planter William Lee and De Neufville, who were acting on their own name, but approval was given by Engelbert François van Berckel an Amsterdam magistrate, led to the severing of ties between Britain and the Republic, and on December 20 to the Fourth Anglo-Dutch War.

On March 1, 1781 John Adams commissioned the Neufville on behalf of the Congress to open a loan of ƒ 1,000,000. In 1782 a consortium of banks granted a loan to the US for an amount of five million; there would be another four million within a few years.

De Neufville corresponded with Benjamin Franklin. He sold his mansion Saxenburg and the warehouse behind on Prinsengracht in 1782. In April 1783 De Neufville went bankrupt; in the same year he remarried Anna Margaretha Langma(r)k, both domiciled in Neerlangbroek, and settled reportedly in Bonn. Leendert emigrated to Boston to start a new life. His father and stepmother followed in 1785. First he did business in Newburyport, but started in 1786 a glass factory in Guilderland, New York, because of the suitable sand. Already in 1788 Leendert asked for financial support, but in 1791 the company went bankrupt. Leendert, who would correspond with George Washington, lost his mind mid 90s. He died around 1812 in a mental asylum in Pennsylvania.

His mother, the widow, received after 1796 a pension by the Congress. The glass factory relaunched as Albany Glass Works.
