= Engelbert François van Berckel =

Dutch politician

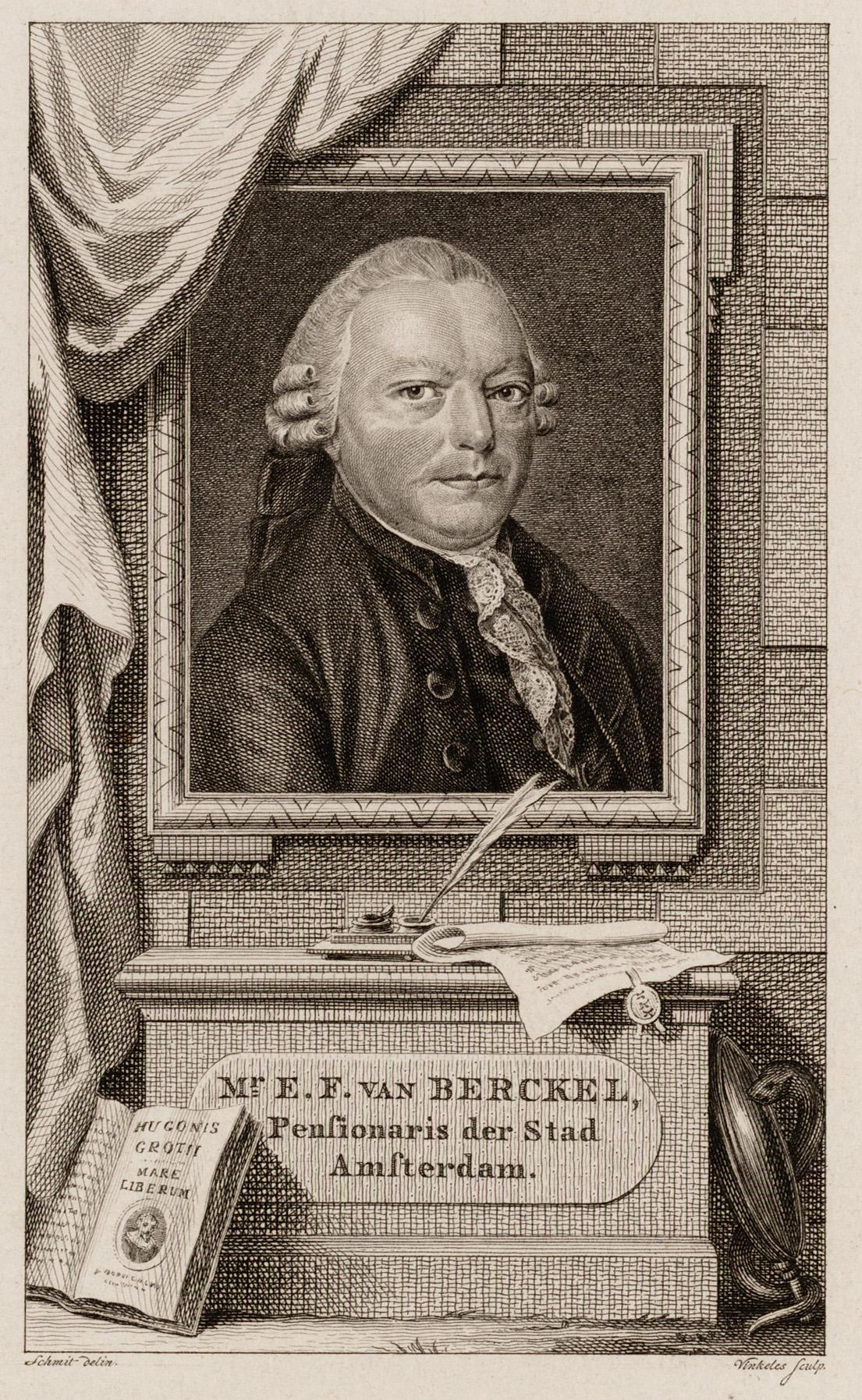
Reinier Vinkeles Engelbert François van Berckel. Pensionary of Amsterdam

Engelbert François van Berckel (Rotterdam, 8 October 1726 – Amsterdam, 30 March 1796) was a Dutch politician and pensionary of Amsterdam during the Patriottentijd.

== Personal life ==
Van Berckel was the son of Engelbert van Berckel, a bewindhehebber (managing director) of the VOC, and burgemeester of Rotterdam, and Theodora Petronella van Hogendorp. He was a brother of Pieter Johan van Berckel. He studied at the University of Utrecht where he received his law degree on 15 August 1748 with a dissertation entitled Dissertatio politica de morali civilis corporis gubernatione. He married two times, first with Geertruy Roskam in May 1759, and after she died in June 1782, with Jacoba Elisabeth Verbeek on 18 May 1783 in Amsterdam.Both marriages remained childless. The Van Berckel family lived in the imposing canal-side building, now known as Herengracht 497, which has the nickname Kattenkabinet.

== Career ==
After he received his law degree he practiced law as an attorney at the Hof van Holland in The Hague for a number of years. His reputation encouraged the vroedschap of Amsterdam to appoint him as the city's second pensionary on 12 August 1762. He was promoted to first pensionary after the death of his predecessor in January 1774. He was the right hand of Egbert de Vry Temminck, the long-serving Amsterdam burgemeester, and together they were very influential in the States of Holland and West Friesland, where he represented Amsterdam. He was a rival of Grand Pensionary Pieter van Bleiswijk (he had been nominated as an alternate when the latter's appointment came up in 1772) and he therefore had a difficult relationship with that functionary, and also with the stadtholder William V, Prince of Orange, because as one of the leaders of the Dutch States Party regenten, he opposed the stadtholder's policies.

Van Berckel was one of the driving forces behind the attempts to conclude a secret treaty of commerce with the rebelling American Colonies in the Neufville-Lee negotiations in 1778 which resulted in an unofficial agreement. After a draft-treaty was found on the person of Henry Laurens, the intended American minister tot the Dutch Republic, when he was intercepted by the Royal Navy on his way to the Netherlands in 1780, Van Berckel was one of the people whose punishment was demanded by the British ambassador to the Republic, Sir Joseph Yorke. Criminal proceedings were instituted before the Hof van Holland, but when the Fourth Anglo-Dutch War broke out in December 1780, eliminating Yorke as a plaintiff, the case was dismissed. Nevertheless, Van Berckel was for a time not welcome as a member of the Amsterdam delegation in the States of Holland and States General.

His position in the Amsterdam vroedschap was weakened when in February 1781 Joachim Rendorp, an Orangist and a personal enemy, became one of the Amsterdam burgemeesters. (Note: Even after their retirements Van Berckel and Rendorp publicly quarreled when Rendorp in his Memoirs cast aspersions on Van Berckel and the latter answered with a dignified reply in a pamphlet, entitled Missive van E.F. van Berckel Oud-Pensionaris der stad Amsterdam, aan den Heere N.N., houdende antwoord op eenige gevraagde elucidatiën, raakende den inhoud der Memoriën van den Heer Mr. Joachim Rensdorp (1793); cf. Van der Aa) Van Berckel was formally removed from the Amsterdam delegation on 31 July 1781, which caused much resentment in Patriot circles, so that the Amsterdam city government relented, and reappointed Van Berckel on 20 November 1782. (Note: John Adams, the American ambassador and his friends rejoiced about Van Berckel's and Joan Derk van der Capellen tot den Pol's reinstatements as witnessed by Adam's correspondence; cf.Adams J., Gregg L. Lint, Papers of John Adams, Volume 14 (Harvard U.P., 2008), pp. 49-50, 79-80)

Together with the pensionaries of Dordrecht (Cornelis de Gijselaar) and Haarlem (Adriaan van Zeebergh) Van Berckel became the leader of the Patriot opposition to the stadtholder in the States of Holland. He was active in the exploitation of the scandal, known as the Brest Affair. After the occupation of the Patriot towns of Hattem and Elburg by the Dutch States Army in September 1786 he was appointed in the special commission of the States of Holland that in reprisal deprived the stadtholder of his position as Captain-General of the Holland regiments in that army.

After the Prussian invasion of Holland Van Berckel was mentioned as one of the culprits in the affair of the arrest of Princess Wilhelmina at Goejanverwellesluis by the Princess herself. He was therefore purged from all his government offices in October 1787. He remained a private citizen until his death in 1796
