= Johann Friedrich von Salm-Grumbach =

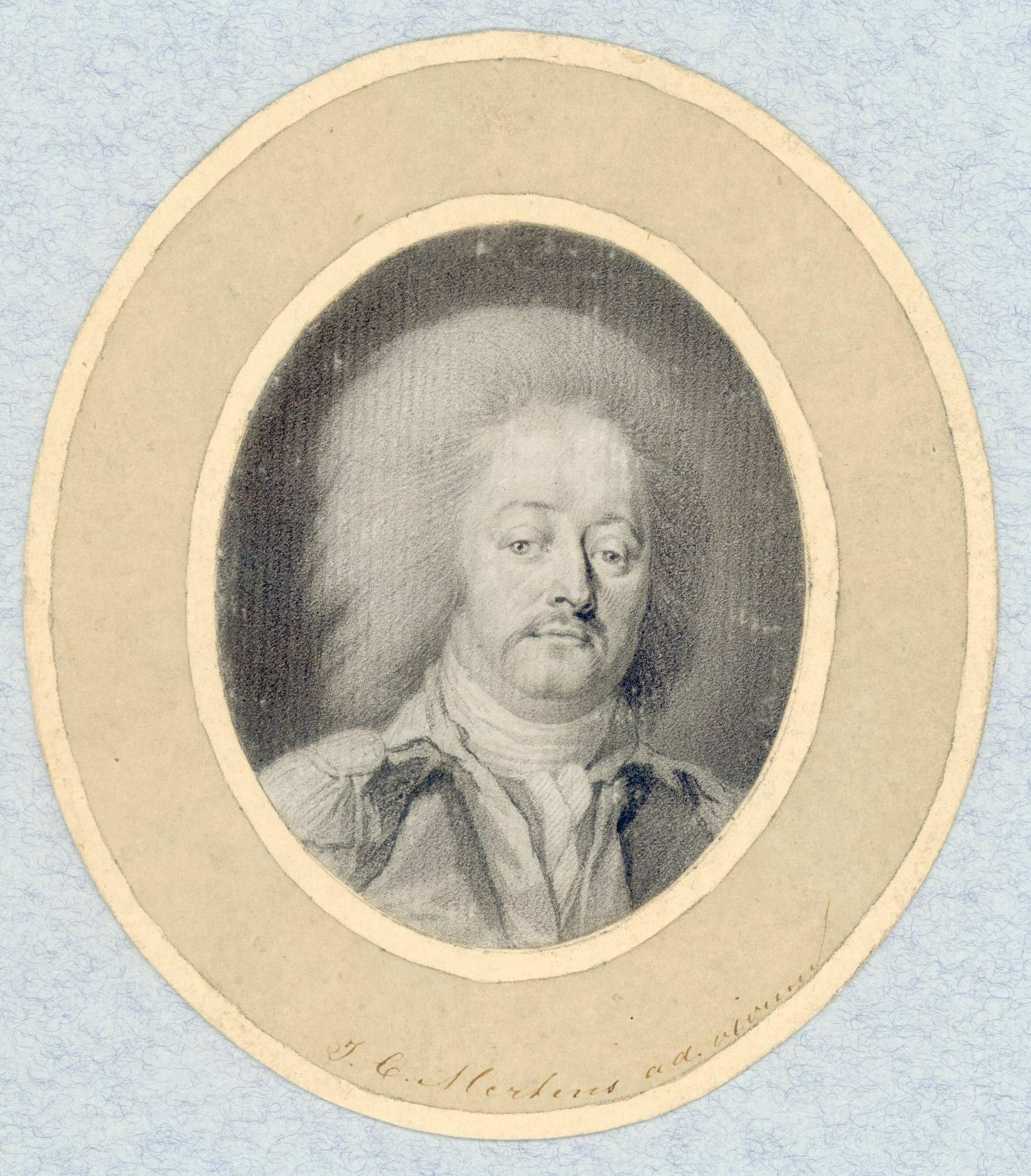
Likely Johann Friedrich of Salm-Grumbach, drawing by Johannes Cornelis Mertens (1752–1823).

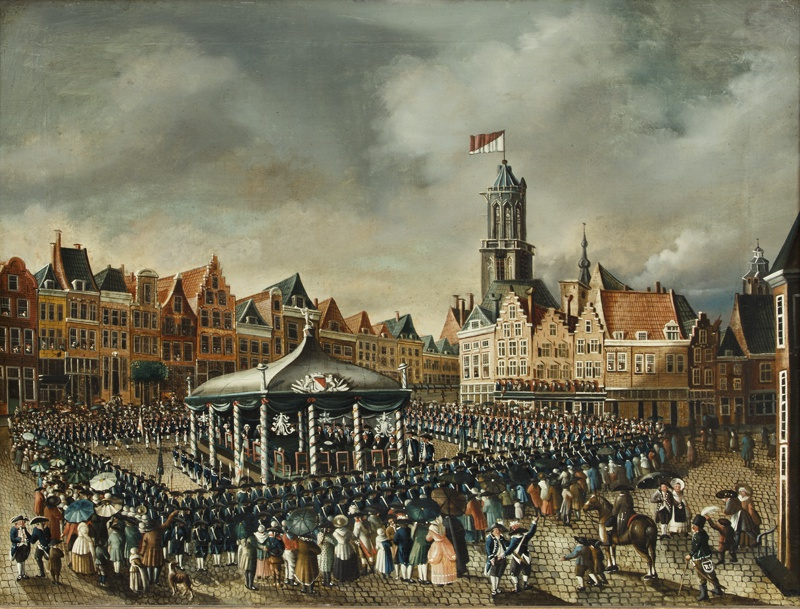
Swearing on the (provisional) Constitution in Utrecht on 12. October 1786; also John Adams was present

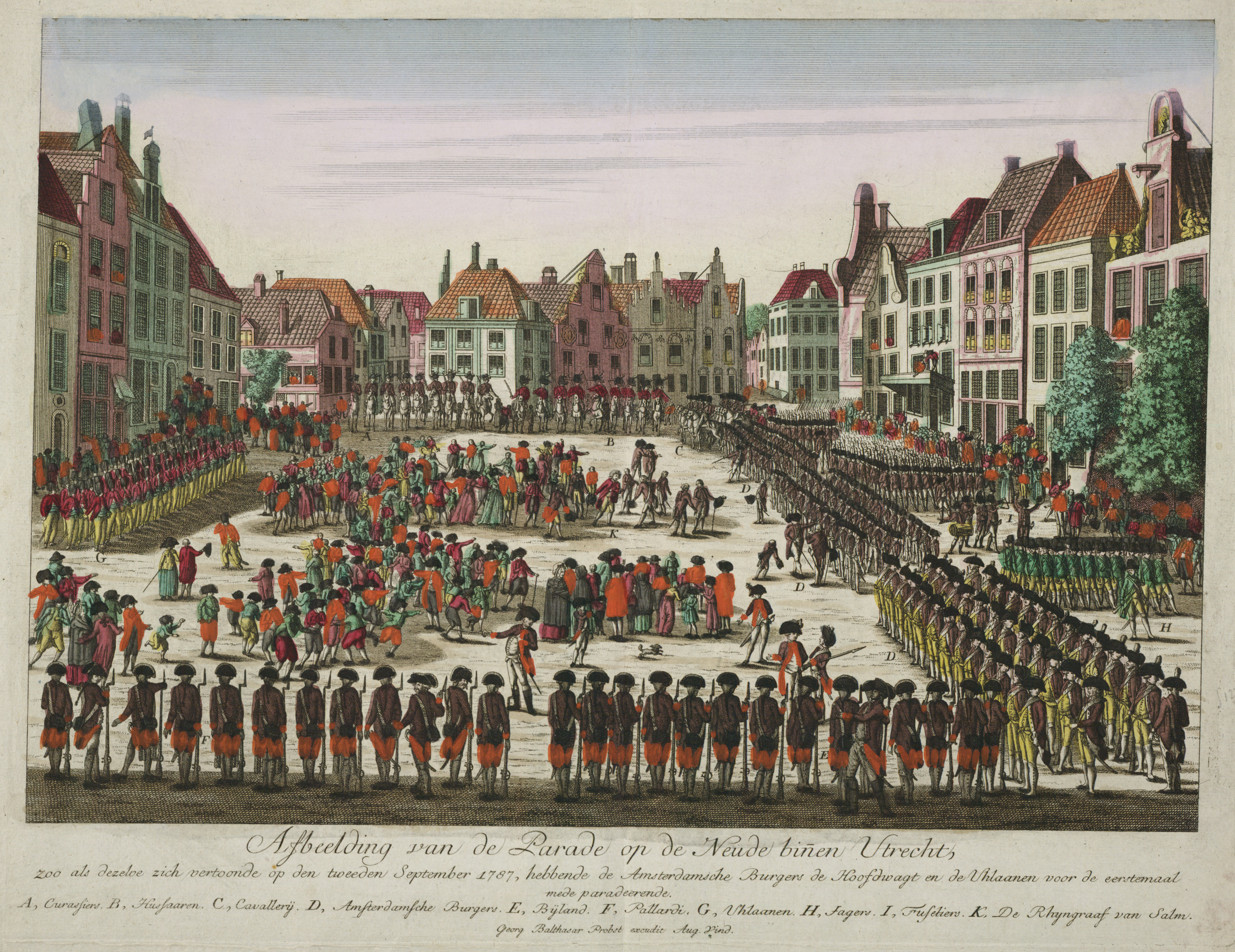
Parade of the free corps, and auxiliary troops in Utrecht on 2 September 1787. Representation of the Rhinegrave Johann Friedrich of Salm-Grumbach, as commander-in-chief in the middle (K) with his striking hairstyle. Drawing by Johannes Jelgerhuis

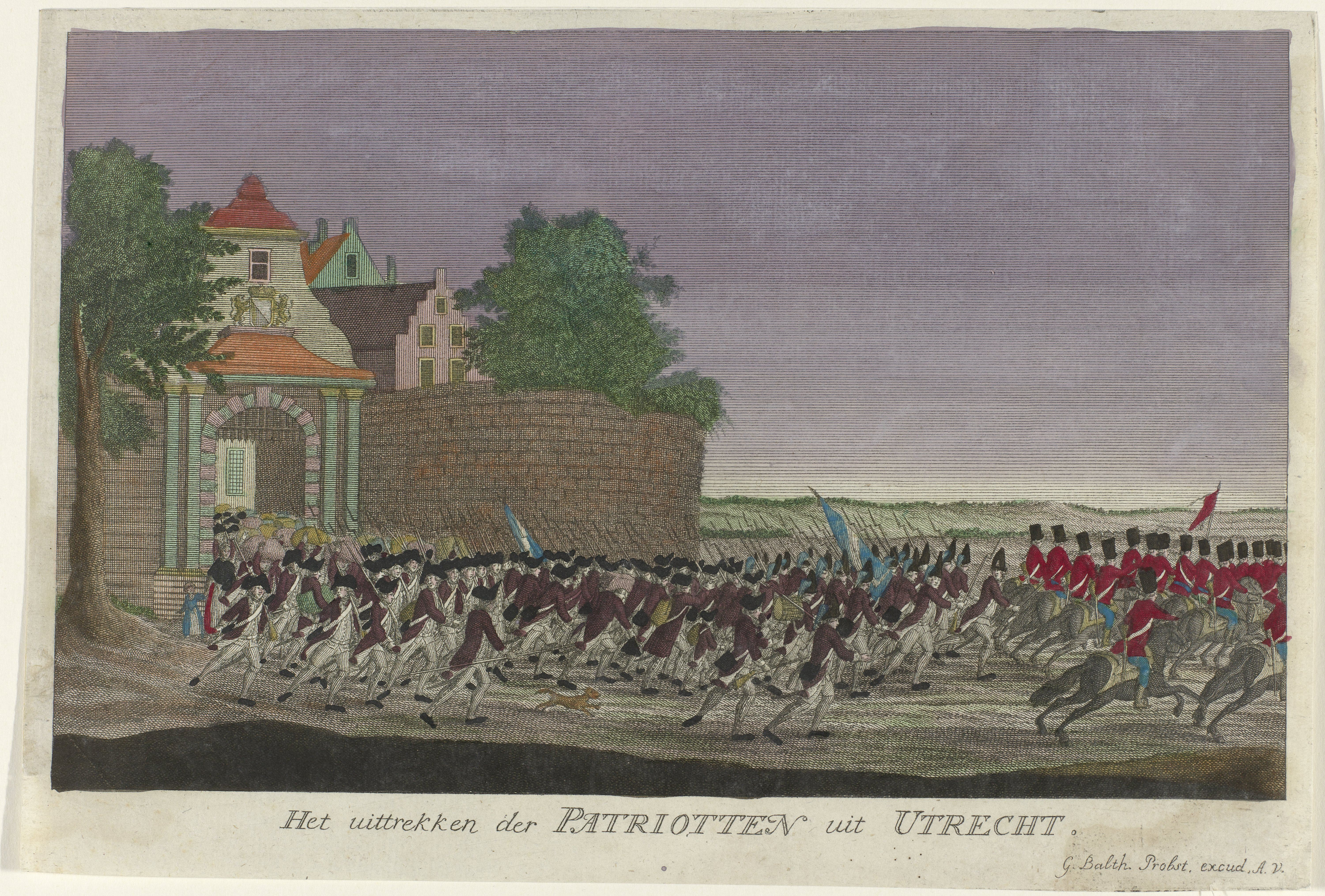
Troops of the Patriotten leave Utrecht late in the evening on Saturday, 15 September 1787

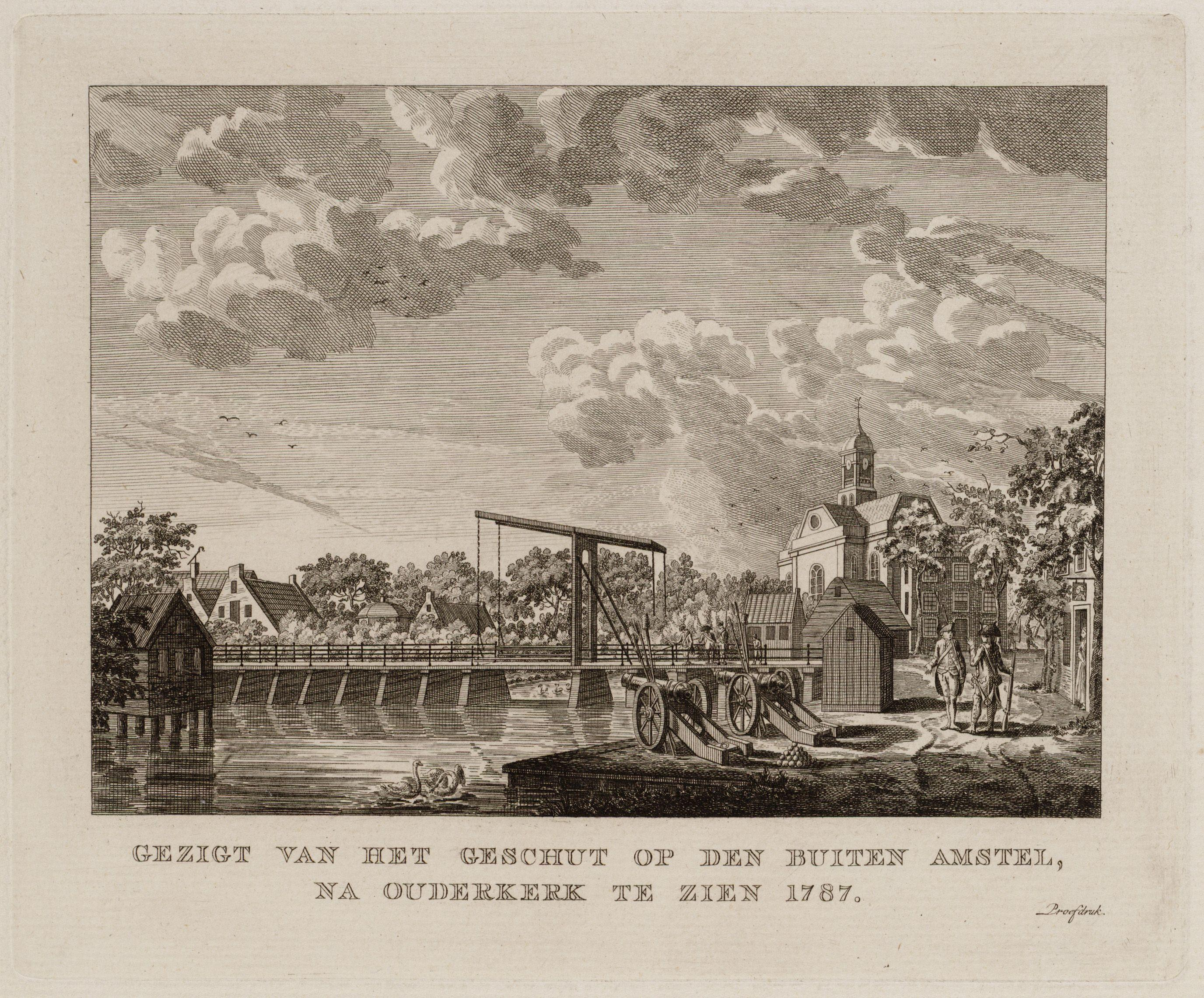
Gezigt van het geschut op den Buiten Amstel, na Ouderkerk te zien 1787

Johann Friedrich von Salm-Grumbach (5 November 1743 – 11 September 1819) was a member of the noble family of Wild and Rhinegrave from the line of Salm-Grumbach. In the mid-1780s, he served as colonel of a legion of the States General of the Netherlands, then of the States of Holland and West Friesland. As the intended successor to Field Marshal Duke Louis Ernest of Brunswick-Lüneburg, who had left the Netherlands in October 1784, he played a significant role in the conflict between the Dutch Patriots and Orangists until mid-September 1787.

Supported by the Patriots, who advocated for a representative representation of the bourgeoisie, he temporarily assumed the position of de facto general and commander-in-chief of the armed forces in Holland in 1786; de jure, Albert van Rijssel was appointed. Later, he commanded several Free Corps in Utrecht until the Prussian invasion of Holland in 1787 strengthened the position of the Stadtholder William V of Orange again. Criticism of Salm's military judgment arose primarily due to the hasty evacuation of Utrecht; afterwards, he was often referred to as a "stylish failure".

For many years, Johann Friedrich von Salm-Grumbach has been confused with Prince Frederick III, Prince of Salm-Kyrburg in various writings, which have been written in several languages. Contemporaries such as the Duke of Brunswick, his former adjutant Quint Ondaatje, August Ludwig Schlözer, and General Von Pfau, as well as many other German historians, hold a different opinion.

== Early life ==
Johann Friedrich was born to the Rhine Count Karl Walrad Wilhelm zu Salm-Grumbach (1701-1763) and his wife Juliane Franziska, a born Countess of Prösing und Limpurg (1709-1775). He grew up in Henri-Chapelle, close to Aachen. He had numerous siblings and became co-heir of the Limpurg-Sontheim dominion, which was sold to Württemberg in 1781.

== Military career ==
Johann Friedrich's military career took him into the French army, where he held the rank of Maréchal de camp. In Dutch service, he commanded a battalion of the infantry regiment "Saxe-Gotha" in 1772. However, it was his role as the commander of a legion in 1784 that marked a significant shift. He raised a force of about 1000 soldiers and 450 horsemen and in 1784, he transferred to the service of the States of Holland and West Friesland, an entity of the States General. They were dominated by the oppositional Patriot movement, which fought the quasi-monarchical position of the stadtholder in the Dutch Republic of the United Netherlands. In this struggle, the grouping allied itself with the French King Louis XVI.

Johann Friedrich played an important role as a military leader of the Dutch Republic during the era of the Patriots as a negotiator with the Austrian emperor Joseph II, to dismantle the Barrier treaties 1709-1715. As commander of the Rhine Legion formed during the Kettle War in 1784, his troops were responsible for the defense of the republic. The troops included eight companies of cavalry (Hussars and Cuirassiers), two companies of Jaegers and six companies on Foot. In 1786, Holland employed him to maintain an army, but six months later dismissed his regiment to save money. In several cities a fund was set up to support his troops so that Salm, eager to replace the Stadtholder, could remain.

On May 12, 1787 Johann Friedrich led the army to Utrecht, to protect the Patriot revolt meanwhile a "democratic El Dorado". On 7 June Johann Friedrich von Salm-Grumbach was appointed commander-in-chief and Ondaatje as liaison officer. but he was not recognized by all officers. Salm's new powers were legally controversial. On the 28 June, he marched to Woerden to capture princess Wilhelmina of Prussia, the wife of the Prince of Orange. Salm suggested conquering Palace Soestdijk and besieging Amersfoort. In August 60 French gunners arrived in the city. When Frederick William II of Prussia invaded the Dutch Republic, Frederick left Utrecht on 16 September 1787 and hurried to Uithoorn and Ouderkerk aan de Amstel, without giving battle. On Thursday, September 20, 1787, the Stadtholder and his wife arrived in The Hague.

In Amsterdam Salm's escape was very resented, and if he had arrived there he would certainly have been harmed. This city, to which the Defense Commission had hastily retreated at Salm's request, closed the gates to Salm's troops.

== Legacy ==
There are different versions of what afterwards. In order to avoid a possible death penalty, Salm decided to flee. He is reported to have hired a boat in Katwijk and reached Hamburg accompanied by Ondaatje. He then visited his brother in Grumbach in the Rhineland-Palatinate. He is then said to have acquired an estate near Bar-le-Duc (Lorraine), which he called “Holland's folly”.

In the summer of 1788, one of the leading patriots Pieter Paulus, on a visit to Paris, refused to admit him. In 1791, Quint Ondaatje, for four months his personal assistant, wrote him an apology.

Frederick endured heavy criticism from Thomas Jefferson: ...a prince without talents, without courage, and without principle. He might have held out in Utrecht for a considerable time, but he surrendered the place without firing a gun, literally run away & hid himself so that for months it was not known what was become of him. Amsterdam was then attacked and capitulated (on 10 October).
