= Aan het Volk van Nederland =

1781 Dutch pamphlet

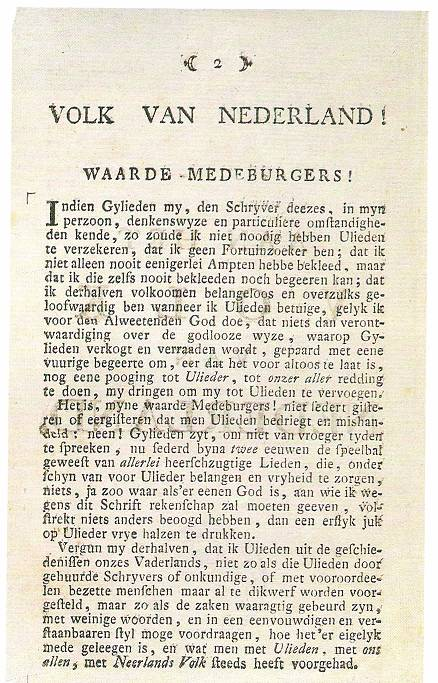
First page of the pamphlet.

Aan het Volk van Nederland (Dutch pronunciation: [ˈaːn ət ˈfɔl(ə)k fɑˈneːdərlɑnt]; transl. "To the People of the Netherlands") was a pamphlet distributed by window-covered carriages across all major cities of the Dutch Republic in the night of 25 to 26 September 1781. It claimed that the entire political system, dominated by the Orange hereditary stadtholderate, was corrupt and had to be overthrown in favour of a democratic republic. The pamphlet became the creed of the Patriots.

The Provincial and Confederal authorities took heavy punitive measures against the pamphlet, and tried to find out who wrote it. It was not until 1891, over a century after the pamphlet appeared, that it could be proven without doubt that the author had been prominent Patriot leader Joan Derk van der Capellen tot den Pol (1741–1784).

== Background ==
In December 1780, the British Empire declared war on the Dutch Republic for intending to join the First League of Armed Neutrality, through which the Dutch sought to secure their right to trade with the American colonies in revolt. This Fourth Anglo-Dutch War was a disaster for the Netherlands, putting a heavy burden on the Dutch economy because of the British naval blockade. Orangists blamed the always obstructive city of Amsterdam, but Patriot pamphleteers opined that stadtholder William V of Orange and his accomplices were the real perpetrators. They sought an alliance with America and France against Britain (and Prussia).

Joan Derk van der Capellen tot den Pol had been removed from the States of Overijssel in 1778 and thus become an unemployed citizen. In the summer of 1781, he travelled to his villa Appeltern, where he prepared his most radical action to be recognised as a politician. In Aan het Volk van Nederland, he mentions the injustice he faced personally in Overijssel when trying to end the drostendiensten, a form of socage (institutionalised feudal forced labour), but it is just one of many issues he addresses. Although the sale and even possession of the pamphlet was immediately strictly forbidden soon after it was first spread, four reprints would be published in 1781 and 1782, not counting the English, French and German translations. In 1788, Aan het Volk van Nederland again played a major role, because Honoré Gabriel Riqueti reflected on it in his Lettres aux Bataves sur le Stadhoudérat ("Letters to the Batavians Concerning the Stadtholderate").

== Contents of the pamphlet ==
Van der Capellen's Aan het Volk van Nederland did not relate the history of the Netherlands from the perspective of the Orange family or the regenten, but that of 'the people'. Mostly the House of Orange, but the regenten as well, had tried their best to take away the natural and historical freedoms from the people. The ancient Batavians were free, but the inhabitants of the Netherlands had been doing worse ever since. In the Middle Ages, counts and dukes had ruled, afterwards the Burgundians and Habsburgers. The Dutch had rebelled against Philip II, but the princes of Orange, who did save the Northern Netherlands from Spanish tyranny, were actually also seeking to enlarge their own power, the pamphlet claimed.

It went on to argue that William the Silent was almost elevated to Count of Holland, Maurice of Nassau was a scoundrel who had Johan van Oldenbarnevelt ("Barneveld") killed, and thanks to Frederick Henry a marriage was arranged between William III and Mary Stuart, commencing the disastrous relations between the English royal house and the House of Orange. William II tried to commit a coup d'état by attacking Amsterdam in 1650. William III was an autocrat who imposed Regeringsreglementen in the provinces of Utrecht, Guelders and Overijssel. William IV and William V continued down this road and were true despots. According to historians Jan Romein (1893–1962) and Annie Romein-Verschoor (1895–1978), Van der Capellen's assertion that ever since the marriage of William II and Mary Stuart, dynastic interests started to outweigh national interests, and that the Orange clan had made efforts to establish a monarchy ever since Frederick Henry, lies quite close to the conclusions of modern-day scholarship (referring to Pieter Geyl's Oranje en Stuart (1939)).

But the country's history from Capellian perspective was just setting the stage for what Aan het Volk van Nederland was really about: criticism of the ills the Republic was suffering from in 1781. The fact that the war against England was developing so disastrously was William V's fault. Van der Capellen also criticised the stadtholder's private life, his public drunkenness and his advances towards unmarried noblewoman Stijn. It was not until the end that Van der Capellen proposed practical measures, his programme for reform:

"Assemble each and everyone in your cities and in the villages in the country. Assemble peacefully and elect from the midst of you a moderate number of good, virtuous, pious men; elect good patriots whom you can trust. Send these as your commissioners to the meeting places of the Estates of your Provinces and order them that they must assemble as soon as possible to make, together with the Estates, in the name of and on behalf of this nation, a precise enquiry into the reasons for the extreme slowness and weakness with which the protection of this country against a formidable and especially active enemy is being treated. Order them as well that they, again together with the Estates of the various provinces, elect a council for His Highness, and that they, the sooner the better, help to devise and deploy all such means as will be considered suitable for the salvation of the endangered fatherland. Let your commissioners publicly and openly report to you about their actions from time to time by means of the press. Take care of the freedom of the press, because it is the only support for your national freedom. If one cannot speak freely to one's fellow citizens and warn them in time, it is only too easy for the oppressors to play their role. That is the reason why those whose behaviour cannot endure any enquiry are always so much opposed to freedom of writing and printing and would like to see that nothing could be printed or sold without permission."

Aan het Volk van Nederland was written in service of Van der Capellen's personal struggle. Van der Capellen unabashedly pointed the reader to his own publications and political activities, albeit in third person (his first mention: "If thou wants to know more about this important matter, read the writings of Baron van der Capellen tot den Pol..."). His translations of Andrew Fletcher and Richard Price, his opposition to the reinforcement of the army, his protest against lending out the Scottish Brigade and the military jurisdiction he called a hideous monstrosity, his plea for a more strict maintenance of the regeringsreglement, and of course his struggle against the drostendiensten are mentioned as the resistance he encountered.

The pamphlet was polarising. Van der Capellen pitched two groups against each other: the corrupt Orangist regenten, called "fortune-seekers" by Van der Capellen on the one hand, against the Patriots on the other. The Patriots were dissident regenten who opposed the stadtholder's policies. Besides Van der Capellen himself, he mentioned the burgomasters of Amsterdam Temminck, Hooft and Rendorp, the pensionaries Van Berckel and De Gijselaar, his Guelderian cousin Robert Jasper van der Capellen tot de Marsch and the Frisian regenten Van Aylva, Van Eysinga, Humalda, Van Beijma, Wielinga and Van Haren. Not all of them were already cooperating with Van der Capellen in 1781, so he created the idea of an alliance that did not exist yet, thus entangling the other dissidents in his plans. His battle in Overijssel suddenly became very important, and was now part of a struggle being fought on the national level.

The case of the Guelderian unmarried noblewoman Constantia van Lynden, who might have had knowledge of classified information, was also discussed. She would have commented on the status of the island colony of Sint Eustatius, vital for the American–Dutch commercial and military trade, which the English occupied and held since February 1781. Van der Capellen claimed Prince William was personally responsible for the huge financial losses Dutch merchants and military setbacks American rebels had suffered as a result.

== Reception of the pamphlet ==
The pamphlet hit like an earthquake. Soon, several responses started to appear. One pamphleteer was afraid Aan het Volk van Nederland would cause riots, citing the 1780 Gordon riots in London as a frightening example. The French ambassador in the Republic, Duke De la Vauguyon, called the pamphlet in his letter to his government in Versailles a "livre très condamnable" (a "very condemnable booklet"). The pamphlet's English translator was, on the contrary, very positive, and wrote:

"The editor of this translation flatters himself, that it will fix the attention, and be honoured with the approbation of the English reader. A great reward was offered in Holland for the discovery of the author of the Dutch original; a fact which proves that it must be an interesting object to the political world. Its contents may, indeed, be honestly recommended to the perusal of our countrymen, on account, both of its narrative, and argument. The pamphlet seems to have been written by a very zealous, but by a very ingenuous Republican: – it seems to have been written for use, not for show. Here is nothing seducing, declamatory, florid, – the whole tenor of this treatise is, at once, simple, and important. Its historical and expostulatory parts are equally interesting; they may be salutary warnings to this island, if they come not too late to be seasonable."

== The secret kept ==
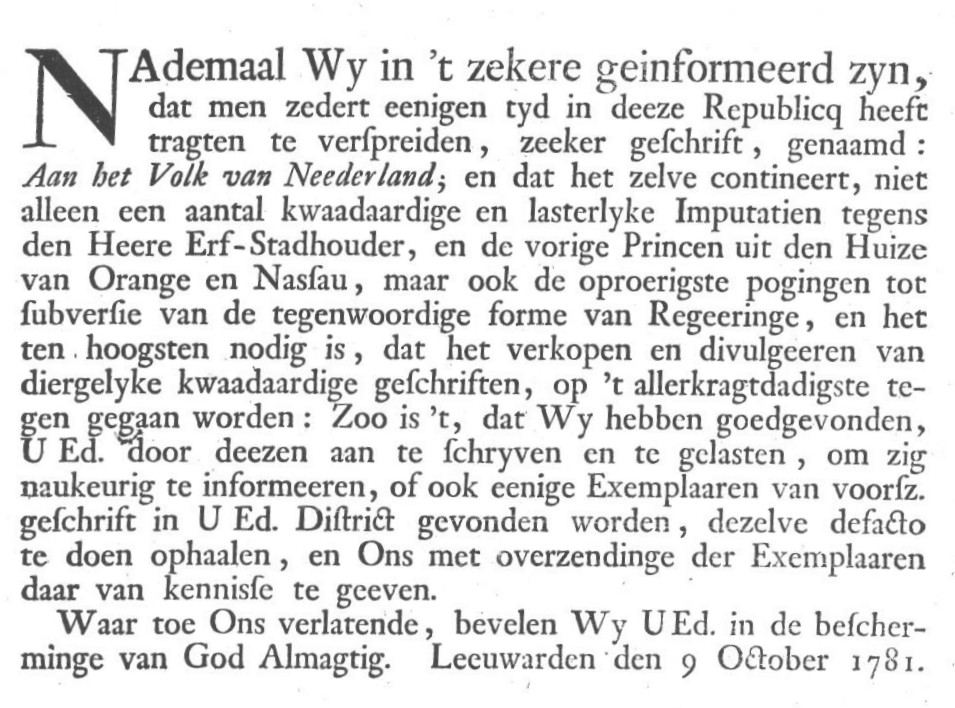
Circulaire of the Provincial-Executive of Friesland, ordering local authorities to counter the spread of copies of the pamphlet (click for translation).

The Provincial and Confederal authorities took heavy punitive measures against the pamphlet, and tried to find out who wrote it. It was not until 1891, over a century after the pamphlet appeared, that it could be proven without doubt that the author had been Van der Capellen. That year, historian Adriaan Loosjes had received an extract from the autobiography (in English) of François Adriaan van der Kemp, who had emigrated to America in 1787.

In it, Van der Kemp had written:

"At the same time my noble friend had written a manly appeal to the People of Netherland, while I visited him at his country seat, and entrusted me with its publication and distribution. [...] The effect resembled an electric shock. It was literally spread through the principal cities as well the country in a single night: and although I had employed several individuals and twenty-five hundred dollars was offered for the discovery, not one person betrayed his trust."

The "secret of Appeltern" was thus very carefully kept. It is suspected that, besides Van der Kemp, Pieter Vreede and Court Lambertus van Beyma knew about the secret; in his letters to Vreede and van Beyma, Van der Capellen referred to the pamphlet using the abbreviation BAHVVN, which according to biographer M. de Jong Hzn meant: B(rief) A(an) H(et) V(olk) V(an) N(ederland) ("L[etter] T[o] T[he] P[eople] O[f] T[he] N[etherlands]"). Joan Derk's cousin and successor Robert Jasper van der Capellen tot de Marsch would have known as well.

Through Aan het Volk van Nederland, Van der Capellen had achieved nationwide notability. In 1782 and 1783, he would have some successes and realise several points of his pamphlet's programme, supported by the people of the Netherlands.

== 20th century republications ==
Two other contrarians in later Dutch history, Multatuli (1861) and Pim Fortuyn (1992), referenced this pamphlet with their own writings carrying the same title. Both of these were aimed against the political elite of their time. In the 20th century, three republications of Van der Capellen's call to action appeared.

- Wertheim, W.F. & A.H. Wertheim-Gijse Weenink ed., Aan het volk van Nederland: het democratisch manifest (Amsterdam 1966).
- Idem, Aan het volk van Nederland: het democratisch manifest van Joan Derk van der Capellen tot den Pol (Weesp 1981). ISBN 978-90-626-2361-7
- Zwitser, H.L. ed., Joan Derk van der Capellen. Aan het volk van Nederland. Het patriottisch program uit 1781 (Amsterdam 1987).

== English translation ==
- An address to the people of the Netherlands, on the present alarming and most dangerous situation of the Republick of Holland: showing the true motives of the most unpardonable delays of the executive power in putting the Republick into a proper state of defence, and the advantages of an alliance with Holland, France and America. By a Dutchman. Translated from the Dutch original (London 1782) – British Library, 935.i.68. There is also a copy in the National Library of the Netherlands (pamphlet 20137).

== Literature ==
- Fairchild, H.L. ed., Francis Adrian van der Kemp 1752–1829, an autobiography (New York & London 1903).
- Romein, J., 'Joan Derk van der Capellen 1741–1784. De tribuun der burgerij' in: J. Romein & A. Romein-Verschoor, Erflaters van onze beschaving, Nederlandse gestalten uit zes eeuwen (11th edition, Amsterdam 1976) 541–565.
- Rooy, P. de, 'Groot gelijk, drie pleidooien Aan het volk van Nederland' in: P.F. van der Heijden & P. de Rooy, Publiek vertrouwen/ Groot gelijk, drie pleidooien Aan het volk van Nederland (Amsterdam 2004).
- Wertheim W.F., & A.H. Wertheim-Gijse Weenink, ‘De vrienden van Joan Derk’ in: E.A. van Dijk ed. et al., De wekker van de Nederlandse natie: Joan Derk van der Capellen (1741–1784) (Zwolle 1984).
