= Adriaan van Zeebergh =

Dutch politician

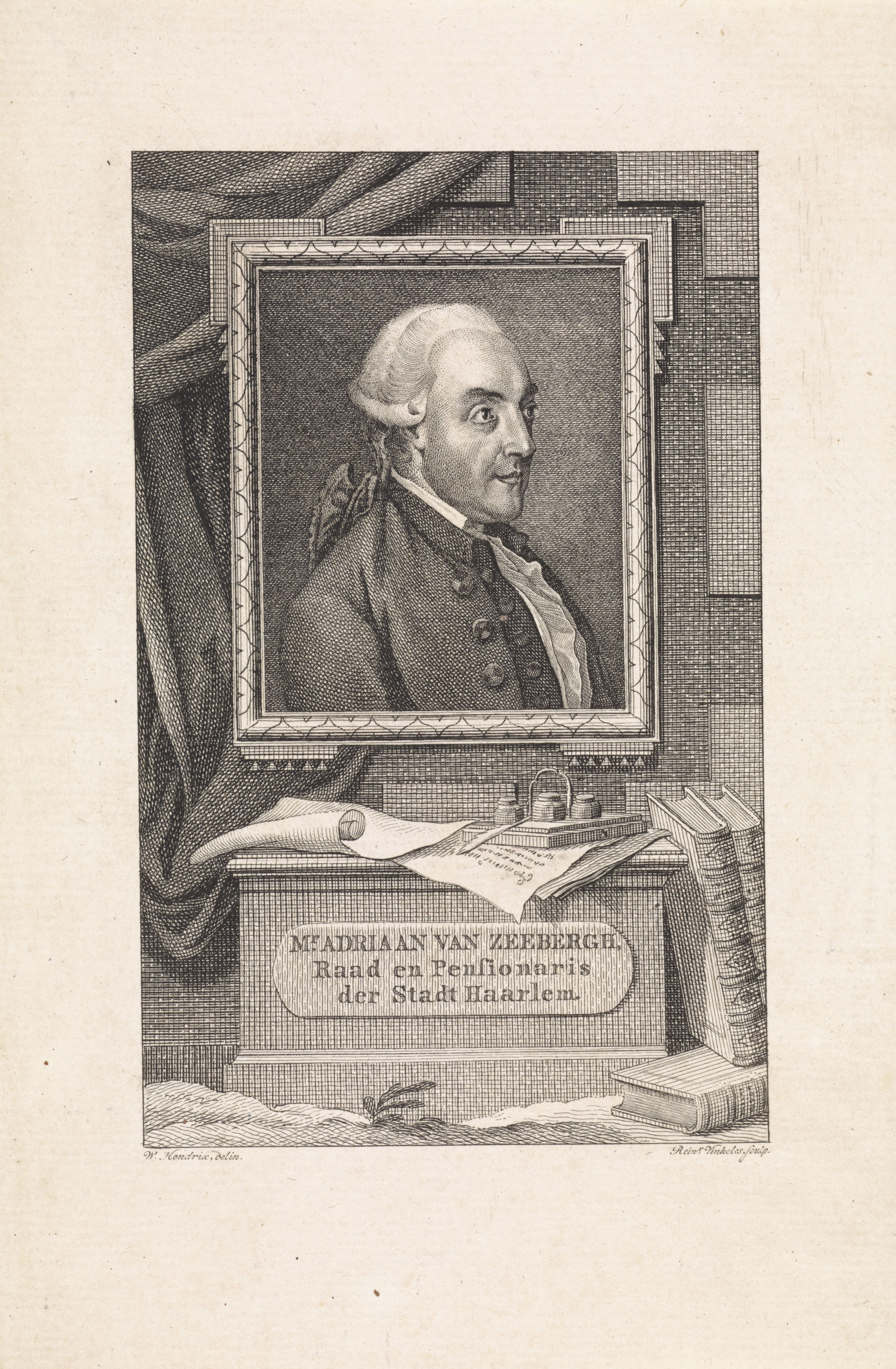
Portrait of Adriaan van Zeebergh by Reinier Vinkeles

Adriaan van Zeebergh (3 June 1746 in Gorinchem – 25 September 1824 in Haarlem) was a Dutch politician during the Patriottentijd.

== Personal life ==
Van Zeebergh was the son of Ludovicus van Zeebergh, a minister of the Dutch Reformed Church in Gorinchem. He studied law at Leiden University where he received his degree (cum laude) on 18 July 1766, with a dissertation entitled De exhibitione et custodiis reorum. He married Johanna Maria Kuits (daughter of burgemeester Anthonie Kuits) in 1776. They did not have any children.

== Career ==
After he received his law degree, van Zeebergh practiced law in The Hague where he shared a home with the poet and lawyer Janus Grotius. The city of Haarlem appointed him its pensionary on 2 December 1775. (Note: Van der Aa gives 1773 as the date, but this is clearly an error, as he also writes in the same sentence that Zeebergh was "only 29 years" at the time.)

Van Zeebergh had been recommended by Grand Pensionary Pieter van Bleiswijk, who held him for an adherent of the Orangist faction. However, he soon proved to be one of the most competent adversaries of the regime of stadtholder William V, and became an ally of the two other leaders of the Patriot faction, Cornelis de Gijselaar, pensionary of Dordrecht, and Engelbert François van Berckel, pensionary of Amsterdam; together they became known as "the triumvirate". He was one of the more enthusiastic persecutors of admiral Lodewijk van Bylandt in the Brest Affair, first by his role as interrogator in the Commission of the States General of the Netherlands that investigated that matter, and later when he (together with van Berckel) demanded the admiral's prosecution before a special admiralty court.

When in 1783 the "aristocratic" Patriots formed a Council of Patriot Regenten to coordinate policy with the "democratic" wing of the Patriot faction (with a. o. Joan Derk van der Capellen tot den Pol), van Zeebergh was made part of its "Bureau of Correspondence" of the Holland pensionaries that corresponded with like-minded regenten in other provinces.

When the political strife in the Dutch Republic came to a boil after the occupation by the Dutch States Army of the Patriot cities of Hattem and Elburg in September 1786, and the stadtholder was relieved of his offices of Captain-General and Admiral-General, van Zeebergh was appointed a member of the commission of the States of Holland that on 22 September 1786 took over his tasks. In October 1786 the Prussian mediators Chomel and von Goertz tried to get the stadtholder restored in his office of Captain-General, but in an interview with the latter on 10 November 1786 van Zeebergh, together with de Gijselaar, made clear that this would not happen.

On 30 January 1787 van Zeebergh introduced a resolution in the States of Holland to institute a commission to prepare a constitutional reform that would make "People's government by representation" possible. It stated:

...whereas the constitution of the province of Holland is in its principles a popular representation, it is necessary that the right of the people be duly ascertained; that the members of the States be rendered responsible to them for their conduct and be precluded from taking any decisive step without their consent...

. Van Zeeberg was elected as one of the 16 members of the commission. Then on 17 February van Zeebergh proposed in the States of Holland that the "Legion of Salm" (Note: The troops under the command of the Rhinegrave of Salm that had been a kind of "private army" of Holland since the crisis of the Kettle War in 1784) would be placed in garrison in The Hague. When this did not immediately happen, de Gijselaar and van Zeebergh left the meeting of the States in protest. Under the system of last en ruggespraak (mandate and consent) the Holland cities were then asked for their consent with this proposal, which precipitated a crisis in the Amsterdam city government, when the Amsterdam Free Corps put pressure on the vroedschap to go along with the proposal, and the vroedschap reluctantly agreed initially, but later refused. This eventually would lead to the purge of the anti-Patriot regenten from the Amsterdam vroedschap in May 1787.

When in May 1787 the Orangists formulated a virtual "declaration of war" in the form of the declaratoir of the stadtholder, and the democratic Patriots wanted to reply by dismissing William V from the office of stadtholder of Holland, van Zeebergh and de Gijselaar pleaded a cautious approach, which made them very unpopular with the hotheads. The triumvirate started to lose its grip on the situation. Then the crisis around the arrest of Princess Wilhelmina at Goejanverwellesluis erupted on 28 June 1787, followed by the ultimatum of her brother the Prussian king.The States of Holland rejected that ultimatum in a note that van Zeebergh drafted. This was a risky move that van Zeebergh himself recognized could turn out very badly. And it did: on 13 September 1787 the Prussians invaded the Dutch Republic.

On 15 September 1787 the Patriot troops in the city of Utrecht retreated to Amsterdam. The three pensionaries proposed that the States of Holland would also move to Amsterdam from The Hague, as that city was without defense. But they did not stay around to defend that proposal in the States, as they had already fled to Amsterdam themselves. A formal decision was therefore never taken, but a number of delegations of Holland cities in the States indeed moved to Amsterdam where they joined the three pensionaries on 17 September. But the rump-States in The Hague then took the decision to declare for the stadtholder, and the Patriot Revolt was over. On 8 October the purged States of Holland asked the Princess meekly what kind of satisfaction she desired for the insult she had suffered. She gave them a list of names of people she held responsible for the arrest at Goejanverwellesluis. Van Zeebergh was one of the people mentioned. Like the others he was forever barred from holding a government office. He became a private citizen.

Van Zeebergh was appointed director of Teylers Stichting in 1780 to replace Jacobus Barnaart. After he had become a private citizen again he devoted his life entirely to this function. Siegenbeek credits him with deflecting attempts by emperor Napoleon to appropriate the assets of the Foundation.

Van Zeebergh was made a Councillor of State in extraordinary service of the Kingdom of Holland and a Knight of the Order of the Union by king Louis Bonaparte. Emperor Napoleon gave him the Order of the Reunion.

After the death of his wife in 1816 van Zeebergh withdrew from public life, because he became too hard of hearing. He died in 1824.

== Sources ==
- Aa, A.J. van der (1878). "Mr. Adriaan van Zeeberg, in: Biographisch Woordenboek der Nederlanden, deel 21". Digitale Bibliotheek voor de Nederlandse Letteren (in Dutch). pp. 35–36.
- Colenbrander, H.T. (1897). "De patriottentijd: hoofdzakelijk naar buitenlandsche bescheiden". Digitale Bibliotheek voor de Nederlandse Letteren (in Dutch). The Hague.
- Siegenbeek, M. (1825). "Levensbericht van Adriaan van Zeebergh, in Jaarboek van de Maatschappij der Nederlandse Letterkunde 1825". Digitale Bibliotheek voor de Nederlandse Letteren (in Dutch). pp. 42–48.
