= Robert Jasper van der Capellen =

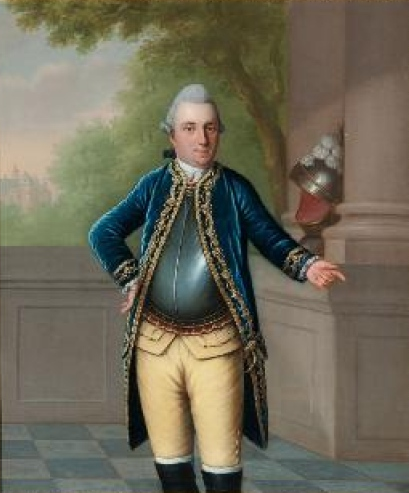
Van der Capellen tot den Marsch.

Robert Jasper, Baron van der Capellen tot den Marsch (30 April 1743 – 7 June 1814) was a scion from the noble regenten family Van der Capellen from Guelders, who became a Patriot, and leader of the movement's democratic wing. He succeeded his cousin Joan Derk van der Capellen tot den Pol after his death in 1784.

== Family ==
Robert Jasper was born on 30 April 1743 at the Boedelhof in Eefde near Zutphen as the son of Frederik Robert Evert van der Capellen (1710–1755) and Anna Margaretha van Lijnden d'Aspermont (1707–1785). He was the fifth of eight children.

Like his full cousin and close friend Joan Derk, who clearly influenced him, Robert Jasper was a fierce opponent of stadtholder William V, Prince of Orange. His opposition to the ruling class in general is remarkable, however, because he came from that class himself, owning four castles, marrying an extremely wealthy lady and holding excessive dinner parties with fellow aristocrats. Van der Capellen's brothers never understood his and Joan Derk's political activism against their own class and the Orangists; his youngest brother was even a chamberlain of William V himself.

Van der Capellen died on 7 June 1814 in Deventer.
