= Catharina Mulder =

Dutch orangist

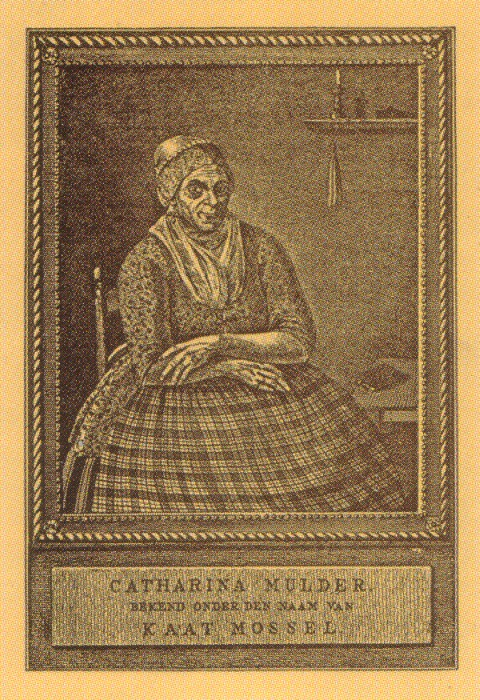
Catharina Mulder

Catharina Mulder (25 March 1723, in Rotterdam – 29 June 1798, in Rotterdam), also known as Kaat Mossel, was a Dutch orangist. She was a fishmonger, selling mussels in Rotterdam, hence her nickname: Kaat Mossel means Cate Mussel. She led and organised the orangist riots in Rotterdam in 1784 against the patriots. She is regarded as a representative of the common orangism.

She was represented in her 1785 court case by Willem Bilderdijk, the well-known Orangist poet and lawyer.
