= Patriottentijd =

1780s instability and violence in the Netherlands

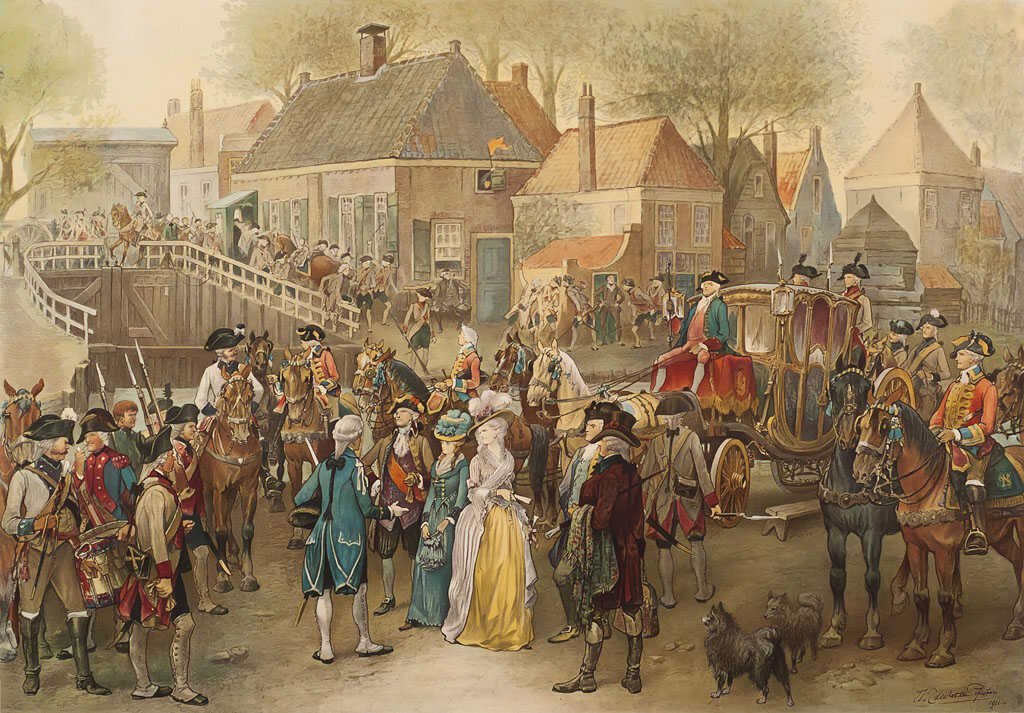
The arrest of Wilhelmina of Prussia by the Patriots

The Patriottentijd (Dutch pronunciation: [pɑtriˈjɔtə(n)ˌtɛit]; lit. 'Time of the Patriots') was a period of political instability in the Dutch Republic between approximately 1780 and 1787. Its name derives from the Patriots (Patriotten) faction who opposed the rule of the stadtholder, William V, Prince of Orange, and his supporters who were known as Orangists (Orangisten). In 1781 one of the leaders of the Patriots, Joan Derk van der Capellen tot den Pol, influenced by the reformer Richard Price and the dissenter Joseph Priestley, anonymously published a pamphlet, entitled Aan het Volk van Nederland ("To the People of the Netherlands"), in which he advocated, like Andrew Fletcher, the formation of civic militias on the Scottish, Swiss and American model to help restore the republican constitution.

Such militias were subsequently organised in many localities and formed, together with Patriot political clubs, the core of the Patriot movement. From 1785 on, the Patriots managed to gain power in a number of Dutch cities, where they replaced the old system of co-option of regenten with a system of democratically elected representatives. This enabled them to replace the representatives of these cities in the States of several provinces, gaining Patriot majorities in the States of Holland, Groningen and Utrecht, and frequently also in the States General. This helped to emasculate the stadtholder's power as he was deprived of his command over a large part of the Dutch States Army. A low-intensity civil war ensued that resulted in a military stalemate, until in September–October 1787 the Patriots were defeated by a Prussian army and many were forced into exile.

== Background ==
=== Etymology ===
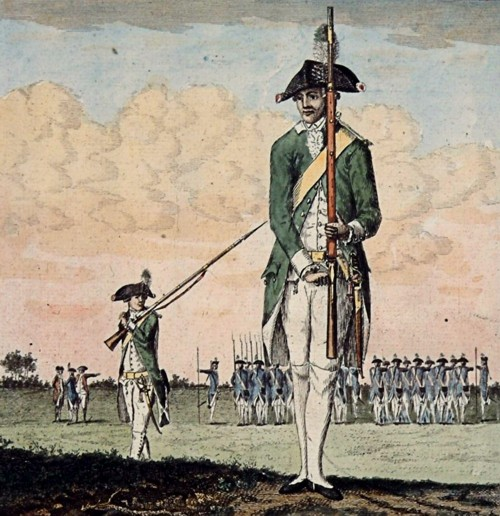
Genootschap "De Vrijheid" from Dordrecht

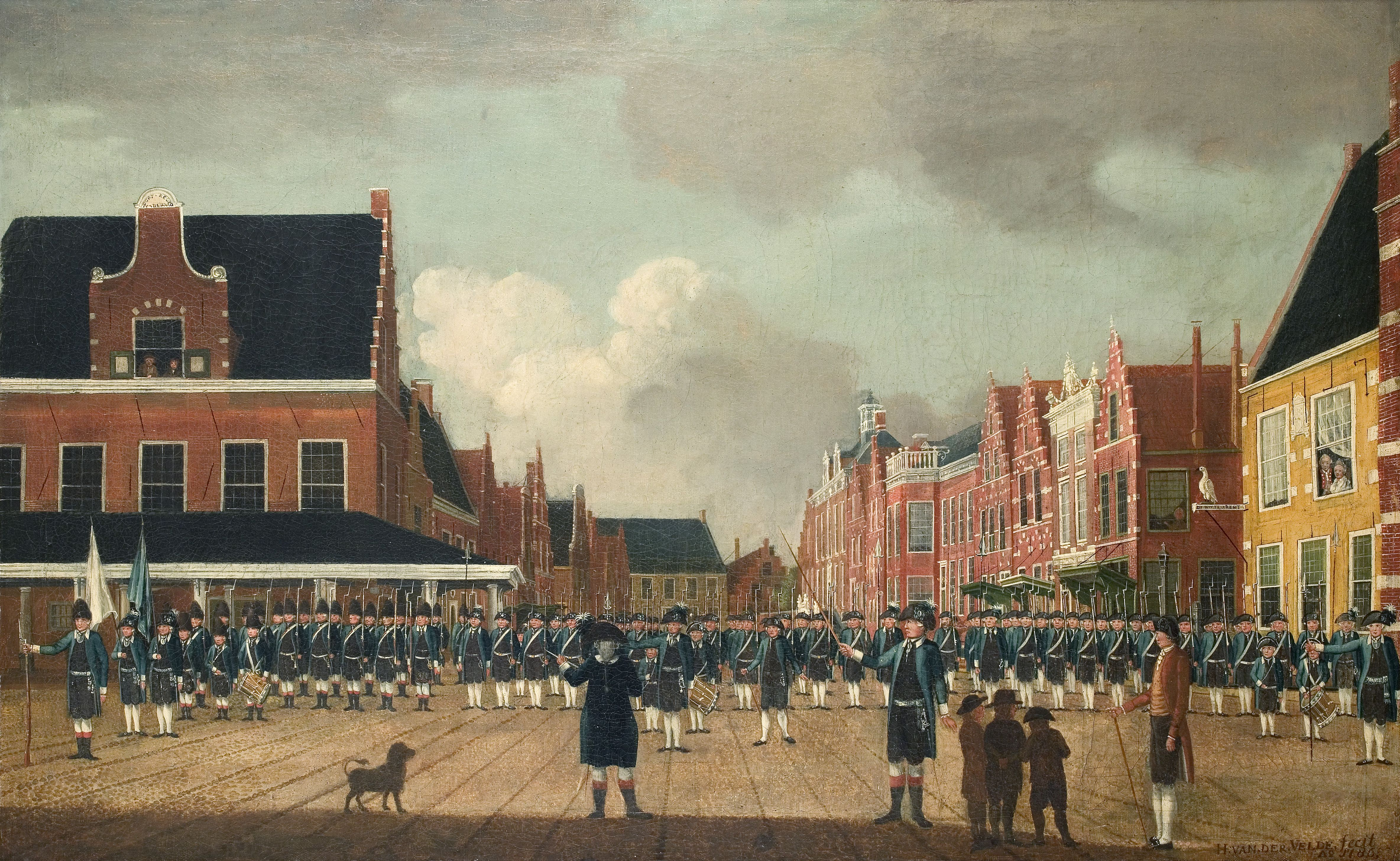
The civic militia (exercitiegenootschap) of Sneek, gathered on the market square in 1786

The term Patriot (from Greek πατριώτης, "fellow countryman") had previously been used mid 17th century by Andries Bicker and the Loevestein faction, but when French troops invaded the Republic in 1747, "Patriots" demanded the return of the Orange stadtholderate, which ended the Second Stadtholderless Period. From 1756 onward, however, Dutch States Party regenten once again began styling themselves "Patriots". The Orangist party did try to reappropriate the term, but it was forced on the defensive, which became apparent when it renamed one of its weekly magazines to De Ouderwetse Nederlandsche Patriot ("The Old-Fashioned Dutch Patriot"). Patriotism and anti-Orangism had become synonymous.

The Patriots can be divided into two separate groups: aristocrats and democrats. The aristocratic Patriots (also called oudpatriotten or "Old Patriots"), initially the strongest, can be viewed as oppositional regenten, who either sought to enter the factions in power, or tried to realise the so-called "Loevesteinian" ideal of a republic without Orange; they came from the existing Dutch States Party. The democratic Patriots emerged later, and consisted mainly of non-regent members of the bourgeoisie, who strove to democratise the Republic.

Finally, the term Patriottentijd for the historical era is a historiographical invention of 19th-century Dutch historians, comparable to the terms "First Stadtholderless Period", "Second Stadtholderless Period", and "Fransche Tijd (French Era)" (for the era of the Batavian Republic, the Kingdom of Holland and the French First Empire, 1795–1813). Herman Theodoor Colenbrander for instance, used the term as the title of one of his main works: De patriottentijd: hoofdzakelijk naar buitenlandsche bescheiden (The Hague, 1897). (Note: Blaas discusses Colenbrander's dissertation and the reactions it elicited from other Dutch historians, like Petrus Johannes Blok, and their different perspectives on the era in the context of Dutch historiography; Cf. Blaas, op.cit.. It should be recognised that the Dutch do not have a monopoly on the term Patriottentijd. In Belgian historiography, the term refers to the almost contemporaneous period of upheaval in Belgian history in which the short-lived United Belgian States were founded. Cf.Sleeckx, J.L.D., De Patriottentijd (1889)) The term was often used in a pejorative fashion, but lately has acquired a more positive connotation.

=== Perceived decline of the Dutch Republic ===
After the halcyon days of the Dutch Golden Age of the first two-thirds of the 17th century, the Dutch economy entered a period of stagnation and relative decline. The absolute size of Dutch GNP remained constant, but the economy was overtaken by that of other European countries in the course of the 18th century. Besides, in a number of economic sectors, such as the fisheries and most industries that had sprung up in the early 17th century, an absolute decline occurred. The country's deindustrialization resulted in de-urbanization as artisans that had worked in the disappearing industries had to move to areas where work was still to be found. The shrinking industrial base was also concentrating in particular areas, to the detriment of other areas where certain industries (shipbuilding, textiles) had formerly been prominent. Remarkably for an era of rapid population growth in other European countries, the size of the Dutch population remained constant during the 18th century at around 1.9 million people, which (in view of the constant absolute size of the economy) resulted in a constant per capita income. But this was somewhat misleading as economic inequality markedly increased during the 18th century: the economy became dominated by a small group of very rich rentiers, and the economy shifted to what we would now call a service economy, in which the commercial sector (always strong in the Netherlands) and the banking sector dominated. These shifts had a devastating effect for the people who experienced downward social mobility and ended up in the lower strata of Dutch society. But even those that were not affected by such downward mobility, and remained in the upper and middle classes, were affected by this perceived economic decline.

The economic decline worked through in the political sphere as after the Peace of Utrecht of 1713 the government of the Dutch Republic felt constrained to enter upon a policy of austerity as a consequence of the dire state of the Dutch public finances. Both the (mercenary) Dutch States Army and the Dutch navy suffered a large shrinkage in the following period, and consequently the Republic had to give up the pretense of being a European great power, in the military sense, with the diplomatic consequences that entailed. It became clear that the Republic had become a pawn in European power politics, depending on the good will of other countries such as France, Prussia and Great Britain. This decline in international diplomatic standing also contributed to the malaise that resulted from the perceived decline.

=== Growing disaffection with the political system ===
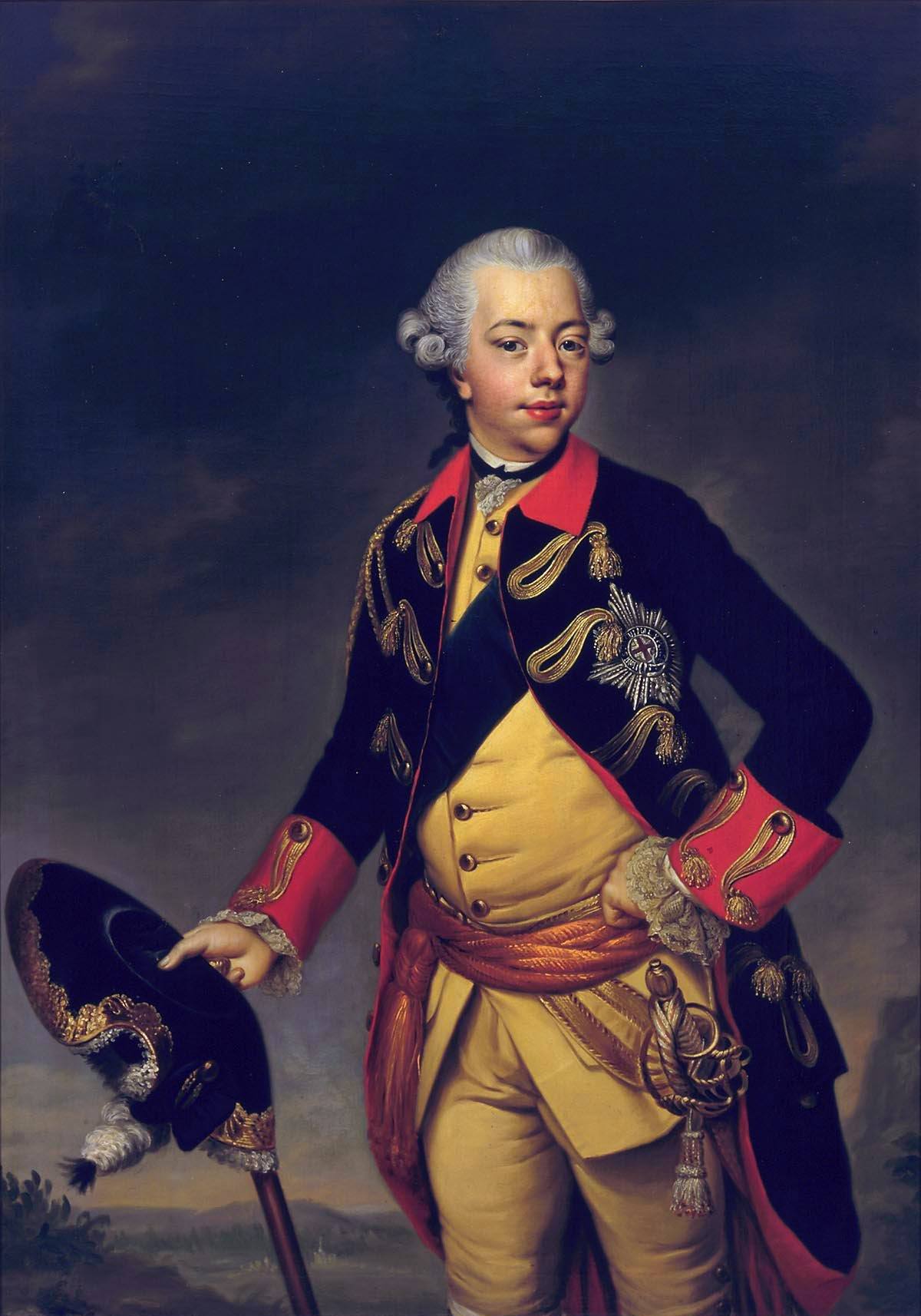
William V, c. 1768–1769.

The disaffection with the perceived state of the economy and diplomatic decline was paired with a growing disaffection with the political system of the Dutch Republic among middle-class Dutchmen. The Dutch "constitution" (Note: Not in the sense of a written basic law, but in the sense of a body of charters and treaties, like the Great Privilege, the Union of Utrecht, and the treaties that defined Dutch independence, like the Peace of Münster, that together defined the Dutch political institutions.) defined the Dutch Republic as a confederation of sovereign provinces with a republican character. (Note: I.e. in which sovereignty resided in the medieval institutions of the provincial States, like the States of Holland, and the States General on the confederal level, and not -at least since 1588- in a king or prince, least of all in the vestigial office of the stadtholder.) Formally, power was supposed to flow upward, from the local governments (governments of select cities that possessed City Rights, and the aristocracy in rural areas) toward the provincial States, and eventually the States-General. Those local governments, however, though ostensibly representing "The People" according to the prevailing ideology, had in fact evolved into oligarchies dominated by a few families that in the cities at least were not formally part of the nobility, but were considered "patrician" in the classical sense. The members of the regenten class co-opted each other in the city council, which elected the magistrates and sent delegates to the regional and national States. This situation had come about gradually, as in medieval times corporate institutions, like the guilds and schutterijen had sometimes had at least nominating powers to the vroedschappen, bestowing a certain amount of political power on members of the middle class (though calling this "democracy" would be an exaggeration).

The concentration of power in a more and more closed oligarchy frustrated the middle class, that saw its opportunities for political and social advancement blocked, also because the political patronage in regard to all kinds of petty offices was concentrated in the hands of the oligarchs, who favored their own political allies. Though offices were often venal and for sale, this fact was ironically less resented than the fact that those offices were not available on the same footing to everyone. Opening up the political system to the middle class had therefore been an objective of political reformers like the so-called Doelisten (Note: Named after the buildings where they congregated during the Orangist Revolution of 1747, like the Kloveniersdoelen.) who in 1747 helped elevate the Frisian stadtholder William IV to stadtholder in all seven provinces, on a hereditary basis, with greatly expanded powers, in the hope that he would use those powers to promote the political influence of the would-be "democrats." That hope proved vain, also because of his untimely death in 1751, after which he was succeeded by his infant son William V, who was three years of age at the time. Power devolved upon regents, first the dowager Princess of Orange, and after her death in 1759, de facto Duke Louis Ernest of Brunswick-Lüneburg, who saw even less merit in "democratic" experiments. Duke Louis would retain a virtual guardianship in accordance with the so-called Acte van Consulentschap even after the young Prince had come of age. Meanwhile, the greatly expanded powers of the stadtholder consisted primarily in his right of appointment, or at least approval, of magistrates on the local and provincial level, which were enshrined in the so-called regeringsreglementen (Government Regulations) adopted by most provinces in 1747. These powers allowed him to overrule the elections by the local vroedschappen if the results did not comport with his wishes, and so bestowed great powers of political patronage on the local level on him (and the regents who ruled in place of the under-age William V before 1766). The end result was that the "States party" regenten that had ruled the country during the Second Stadtholderless Period were replaced by Orangist party men, who were ideologically opposed to popular influence, closing the door to "democratic" experiments. Though the "democrats" had been in the Orangist camp in 1747, they therefore soon came into an alliance of convenience with the disenfranchised "States party" regenten.

=== The American imbroglio ===
The American Declaration of Independence did not elicit enthusiasm from everyone in the Dutch Republic once it became known there in August 1776. The stadtholder wrote to the griffier of the States-General, Hendrik Fagel, that it was only "... the parody of the proclamation issued by our forefathers against king Philip II". (Note: William V to H. Fagel, 20 August 1776, in: Kramer, F.J.I (ed.), Archives ou correspondance inédite de la maison d'Orange-Nassau, 5th series, 3 vols. (Leiden 1910-1915), vol I, p. 449.) But others were less scornful. Dutch merchants, especially in the Amsterdam Chamber of the moribund Dutch West India Company (WIC), had long chafed against the restrictions Britain's Navigation Acts imposed on direct trade with British North America. The American Revolutionary War opened new perspectives to unfettered trade, though for the moment primarily on the smuggling route via the WIC colony of Sint Eustatius. That entrepôt soon became an important export port for the supply of the American rebels with Dutch arms. The Amsterdam regenten were particularly interested in opening formal trade negotiations with the Continental Congress; secret diplomacy was soon embarked upon by the pensionaries of a number of mercantile cities, like Engelbert François van Berckel (Amsterdam) and Cornelis de Gijselaar (Dordrecht), behind the back of the stadtholder and the States-General. The French ambassador to the Republic, Vauguyon, arranged contacts with the American ambassador to the French court, Benjamin Franklin, in 1778, which in time led to the sending out of John Adams as American emissary to the Republic. In 1778, there also were secret negotiations between the Amsterdam banker Jean de Neufville and the American agent in Aachen, William Lee. The two concluded a secret agreement on a treaty of amity and commerce between the two Republics, the draft of which was discovered by the British when they intercepted Henry Laurens at sea. They used this as a casus belli for declaring the Fourth Anglo-Dutch War in December 1780 (together with the actions from Dutch territory by the American privateer John Paul Jones, and the planned Dutch accession to the First League of Armed Neutrality).

The war went disastrously for the Dutch, despite the fact that the Dutch fleet had been enlarged appreciably in the preceding years. but it was scarcely used by the Dutch, with the stadtholder, as Admiral-General, in supreme command. At the start of the war, a number of Dutch warships were surprised by ships of the Royal Navy, who according to the Dutch, sneaked up under a false flag, and when they had approached the unsuspecting Dutchmen (who were not yet aware of the start of the war), ran up their true colors and opened fire. The Dutch ships then struck their colors after firing a single broadside in reply "to satisfy honor." In this way individual ships, and even a complete squadron, were lost. (Note: De Jonge mentions the following examples: The warships under the command of captains Satinck (Princess Carolina) and Van Volbergen (Rotterdam) de Jonge, pp. 447-450; the frigate Mars under Capt. Van Bylandt, de Jonge, pp. 460-462; the squadron under admiral Crul (who was killed) de Jonge, pp. 462-467) The British blockaded the Dutch coast without much response from the Dutch fleet. There was one big battle between a Dutch squadron under rear-admiral Johan Zoutman and a British one under vice-admiral Sir Hyde Parker, which ended inconclusively, but on the whole the Dutch fleet remained in port, due to a state of "unreadiness," according to the Dutch commanders. This lack of activity caused great dissatisfaction among Dutch shippers who wanted convoy protection against the British, and also among the population at large, who felt humiliated by what many saw as "cowardice." The stadtholder was generally blamed. After a brief wave of euphoria due to Zoutman's heroics (which were duly exploited in the official propaganda), the navy again earned the disapproval of public opinion because of its inactivity. This only increased after the States-General in 1782 agreed with France on a naval alliance or concert that led to a planned joint action against Great Britain. To that end a Dutch fleet of ten ships of the line would in 1783 be sent to the French port of Brest to join the French fleet there. However, a direct order to set sail was disobeyed by the Dutch naval top with again the excuse of "unreadiness," but some officers, like vice-admiral Lodewijk van Bylandt, the intended leader of the expedition, let it be known that they did not want to cooperate with the French. This caused a scandal, known as the Brest Affair in which Pieter Paulus, the fiscal (prosecutor) of the Admiralty of Rotterdam was to lead an inquest, but this never resulted in a conviction. But the damage to the reputation of the Dutch navy and the stadtholder as its commander-in-chief in Dutch public opinion was appreciable, and this undermined the regime.

The stadtholder was not the only one reminded by the American Declaration of Independence of its Dutch equivalent of 1581. Many others saw an analogy between the American Revolution and the Dutch Revolt, and this helped engender much sympathy for the American cause in Dutch public opinion. When John Adams arrived in the Netherlands from Paris in 1780, in search of Dutch loans for the financing of the American struggle, he came armed with a long list of Dutch contacts. At first, however, it was an uphill struggle to interest the Dutch elite. Adams set to work to influence public opinion with the help of a number of those Dutch contacts which he enumerates in a letter to United States Secretary of Foreign Affairs Robert Livingstone of 4 September 1782. He mentions the Amsterdam lawyer Hendrik Calkoen, who was very interested in the American cause, and who posed thirty questions on the matter that Adams answered in a number of letters, that were later bundled and published as an influential pamphlet. Calkoen was keen to again emphasize the analogy between the Dutch and American struggles for independence. He also mentions the Luzac family that published the Gazette de Leyde, an influential newspaper, whose publisher Jean Luzac supported the American cause by publicising the American constitutional debate. (Note: Another member of the Luzac family was Elie Luzac, who had been an ardent Orangist since the Orangist revolution of 1748, when he was embroiled in the polemic known as the "Witten-Oorlog" with the States-Party partisan Jan Wagenaar. In his dotage he was still active during the Patriottentijd on the side of the Orangists; Cf. Geyl (1947), pp. 40-41) The Gazette was the first European newspaper to carry a translation of the Constitution of Massachusetts, principally authored by Adams, on 3 October 1780. In that context Adams also mentions the journalist Antoine Marie Cerisier and his periodical le Politique hollandais. Another propagandist for the American cause, who drew inferences for the Dutch political situation, was the Overijssel maverick nobleman Joan Derk van der Capellen tot den Pol, who had the Declaration of Independence, and other American constitutional documents, translated into Dutch.

By these propagandistic activities the American and Dutch causes became intertwined in the public's mind as a model of "republican fraternity". Adams himself harped on this theme in the "Memorial" he presented to the States-General to obtain acceptance of his credentials as ambassador on 19 April 1781:

If there was ever among nations a natural alliance, one may be formed between the two republics...The origins of the two Republics are so much alike that the history of the one seems to be but a transcript of the other; so that every Dutchman instructed in the subject must pronounce the American revolution just and necessary or pass censure upon the greatest actions of his immortal ancestors; an action which has been approved and applauded by mankind and justified by the decision of heaven...

The immediate audience of the "Memorial" may have been sceptical, but elsewhere the document made a great impression.

== The Patriot Revolt ==
=== The pamphlet "To the People of the Netherlands" ===
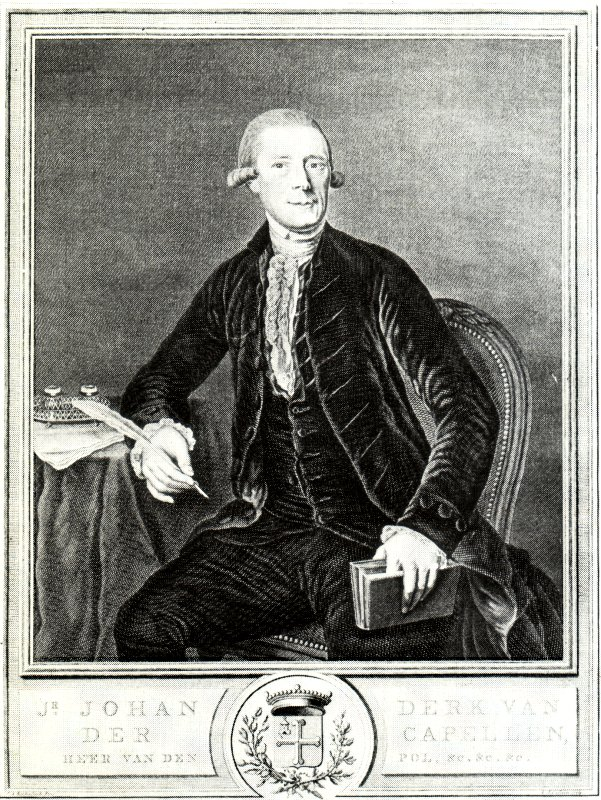
Portrait of Joan van der Capellen tot den Pol

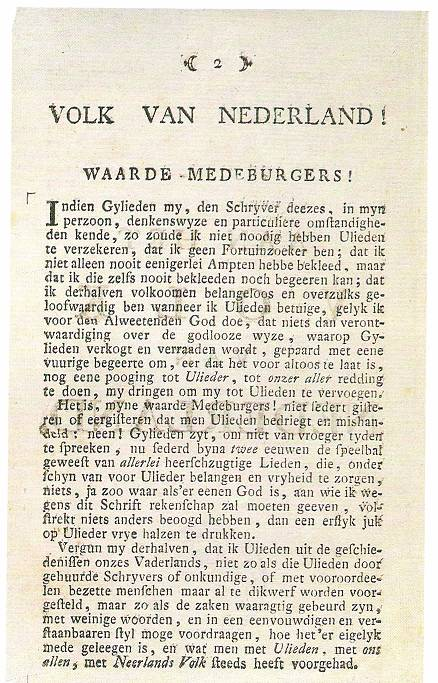
The first page of Aan het Volk van Nederland.

In the night of 25 on 26 September 1781, the anonymous pamphlet Aan het Volk van Nederland ("To the People of the Netherlands") was distributed in a number of Dutch cities. It was later discovered that it had been written by Adams' friend Joan Derk van der Capellen tot den Pol, and that its successful distribution had been organised by François Adriaan van der Kemp. Though the pamphlet was immediately proscribed as seditious by the authorities, it enjoyed a wide circulation.

"Seditious" it certainly was, as the pamphlet repeatedly exhorted the burghers of the Netherlands to arm themselves and take matters into their own hands. As was usual at the time, the pamphlet contained a romanticized overview of Dutch history, going back to the mythical ancestors of the Dutch people, the Bataven, and taking the Middle Ages and the early history of the Republic in stride. But the perspective was decidedly anti-stadtholderian, and emphasized that the people are the true proprietors, the lords and masters of the country, not the nobles and regenten. The author likens the country to a great company, like the VOC, in which the administrators serve the shareholders.

...The great that are governing you, the Prince or whoever has any authority in this country, only do this on your behalf. All of their authority derives from you...All men are born free. By nature, no one has any authority over anyone else. Some people may be gifted with a better understanding, a stronger body or greater wealth than others, but this does not in the least entitle the more sensible, stronger or wealthier to govern the less sensible, the weaker and the poorer...In these companies, usually called civil societies, peoples or nations, the members or participants pledge to promote each others' happiness as much as possible, to protect each other with united force and to maintain each other in an uninterrupted enjoyment of all property, possessions and all inherited and lawfully acquired rights...

The author then continues with a diatribe against the stadtholder:

...There is no freedom and no freedom can exist in a country where one single person has the hereditary command over a large army, appoints and dismisses the country's regents and keeps them in his power and under his influence, deals with all the offices, and by his influence on the appointments of professors controls the subject matter that is being taught to the country's youth studying in universities, where the people is kept ignorant, where the people is unarmed and has nothing in the world...

Therefore:

...Anything which is attempted at this time to save our truly almost irretrievably lost fatherland will be in vain, if you, o people of the Netherlands, remain passive bystanders any longer. So do this! Assemble each and everyone in your cities and in the villages in the country. Assemble peacefully and elect from the midst of you a moderate number of good, virtuous, pious men... Send these as your commissioners to the meeting places of the Estates of your Provinces and order them ...to make, together with the Estates ...a precise inquiry into the reasons for the extreme slowness and weakness with which the protection of this country against a formidable and especially active enemy is being treated ...Let your commissioners publicly and openly report to you about their actions from time to time by means of the press...Arm yourselves, all of you, and elect yourselves the ones that must command you. Act with calmness and modesty in all things (like the people of America, where not one drop of blood was shed before the English attacked them in the first place)...

These themes: the primacy of the people, whose servants the politicians are; the need to arm the people in units who elect their own officers; to elect commissioners who investigate government wrongdoing, as a parallel source of power next to the existing institutions; the need to protect the freedom of the press; would be repeated time after time in other Patriot pamphlets and the Patriot press in later years. It was a mixture of old and new ideas, and attitudes to the Dutch constitution. But this mixture would diverge into two distinctive strands in the course of the next few years, until it would lead to an ideological split between the "aristocratic" and "democratic" Patriots.

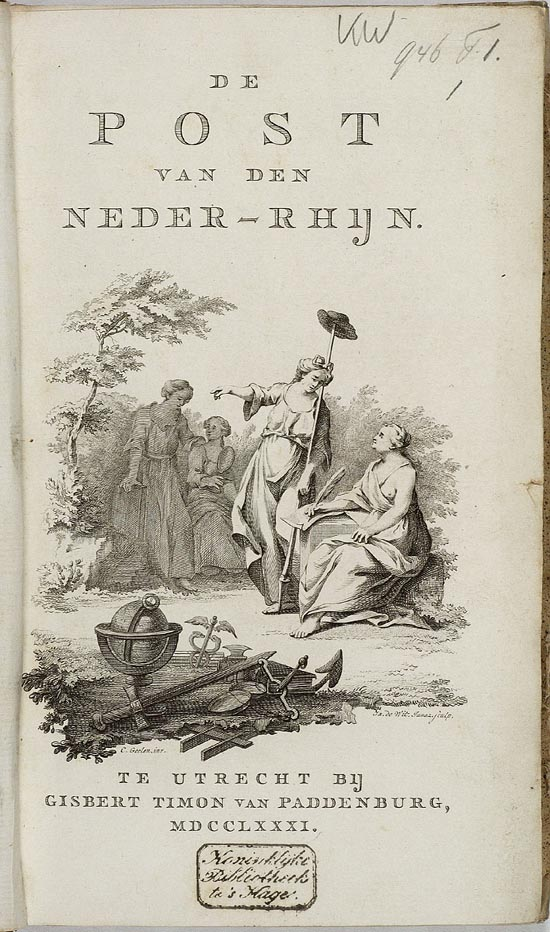
De Post van den Neder-Rhijn

Of course, Aan het Volk van Nederland was just one example of the many pamphlets, both Orangist and Patriot, that were published during the Patriottentijd. But these one-off publications were soon joined by an innovation in the vernacular press. Before 1780 the "opinion newspapers," like the Gazette de Leyde and the Politique Hollandais were written in French, and generally only read by the elite. But in 1781 the Patriot Pieter 't Hoen started a periodical in Dutch in Utrecht, entitled De Post van den Neder-Rhijn (The Post of the Lower Rhine) that would become a combination of opinion weekly, tabloid, and scandal sheet, with a Patriot bias that attacked the stadtholder and the "aristocratic" Patriots with equal abandon. It was soon joined by an Amsterdam magazine with the same character, the Politieke Kruijer (Political Porter), edited by J.C. Hespe, and later by Wybo Fijnje's Hollandsche Historische Courant (Dutch Historical Journal) in Delft. All these periodicals enjoyed great popularity in middle-class circles, probably because they mixed serious political analysis with scurrilous libels of the political elite. The journalists and publishers were often prosecuted by their enraged victims, (Note: Examples are the prosecution of the poet Jacobus Bellamy, who published under the pseudonym Zelandus in the Post van den Neder-Rhijn, and was unsuccessfully prosecuted by the Utrecht schout Bentinck-Athlone; and of the editor of the Politieke Kruyer by burgemeester Joachim Rendorp of Amsterdam; Cf. Geyl (1947), pp. 102, 114) but fines and jail-time were part of the job in these times. As they had a national readership they helped Patriot politics go beyond the local confines they would normally have encountered. And their ideological consistency helped to bring about unity in especially the "democratic" wing of the Patriot movement.

=== The exercitiegenootschappen ===
Since the late Middle Ages cities in the Habsburg Netherlands had employed citizen militias for external defense (mostly against incursions from neighboring provinces), and to keep public order. These militias, called schutterijen, played an important part in the early stages of the Dutch Revolt when they on their own successfully defended important cities against the Spanish troops of the Duke of Alba, which helped to give them an aura of heroism. In this early period the militia often formed a separate and independent center of power of the burghers who were its members, rivaling the vroedschap as the power center of the elite. This independence was symbolized by the fact that the schutterij usually elected its own officers. But starting in the early 17th century the militias lost their independence and became subservient to the regular city magistracy. They also became a part of the regular defense structure of the country, next to the States Army (though not part of that mercenary military formation). During the revolution of 1747 the Doelisten attempted to restore the independent role of the schutterijen, but this attempt failed. By the early 1780s the militias were but a caricature of their proud predecessors, subservient to the city magistrates, who made officer commissions the preserve of the regenten class, and more like recreative societies than serious military formations. Many Patriots took this decline of the schutterijen as a synecdoche for the decline of the Republic, and the reform of the militias was seen as an important part of the necessary reform of the Republic. But as elsewhere the stadtholderian regime blocked such reform.

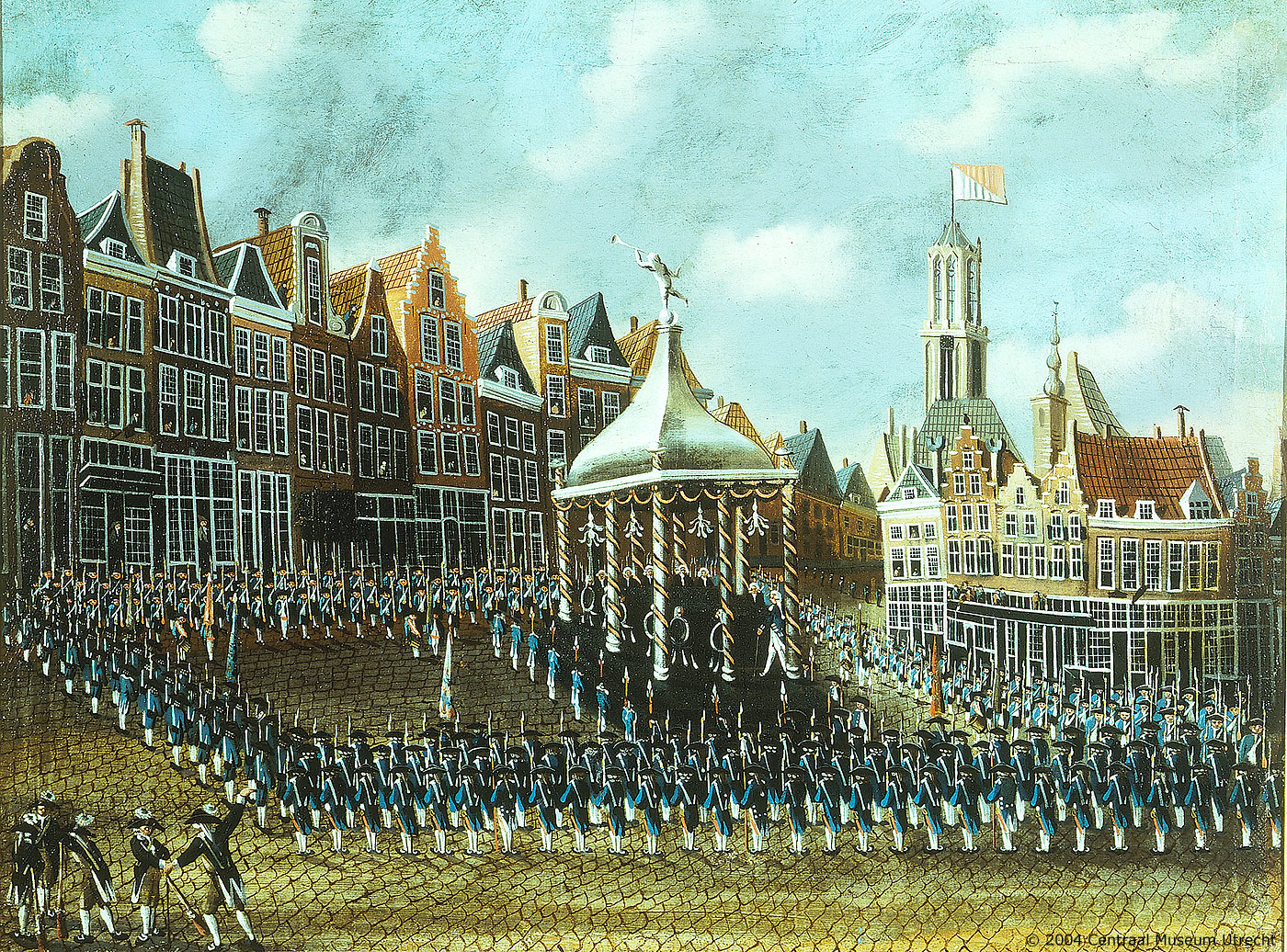
An exercitiegenootschap drill in Utrecht on 12 October 1786 when several members of the city council were replaced by "democratic" election.

From 1783 onwards, the Patriots therefore started to form their own militias, parallel to the official schutterijen, which they called by innocuous names like exercitiegenootschappen or vrijcorpsen (Free Corps (Note: These Free Corps should be distinguished from the German Freikorps, of the 20th century, whose name they shared, but that had a completely different character. Not only was their ideology very different, but the German Freikorps consisted of military veterans, whereas most Dutch Free Corps members had always been civilians.)) in order not to provoke the city governments. In contrast with the schutterijen these competing militias were open to members of all religious denominations; they elected their own officers; and they trained regularly in military drill (exercitie) and the use of arms. The Patriots proposed to use the militias to promote the representation of their officers in official councils, and to defend the rights of free assembly and speech of the citizenry. Depending on local political circumstances the Free corps sometimes remained a parallel military structure, and sometimes gradually took over the old schutterij. An example of the latter was the city of Utrecht where under the direction of the exercitiegenootschap Pro Patria et Libertate (in which the student leader Quint Ondaatje played a prominent role) the schutterij was taken over by the Free Corps, while the old organisational structure with company names like "the Pikes" and "the Black Boys" was studiously retained (including the old flags and banners).

At first in some cities the vroedschap encouraged this usurpation of the role of the schutterij, because it helped to undermine the stadtholder's right to appoint the leadership of the militia (as in Alkmaar, Leiden and Dordrecht), which the regenten resented themselves. But this in itself was a threat to the established order, as the claim to revive the schutterijen was commingled with the principle of electing officers freely from the citizenry and the claim to restore their "proper" place in the hierarchy of civic institutions. Where a regent remained in charge of the schutterij he was suddenly supposed to represent his men in the vroedschap thereby cunningly reverting the old hierarchy. The Patriots made no secret of the political implications of their reform of the schutterijen. In cities like Leiden, Zutphen and Utrecht the Free corps drew up petitions demanding recognition of the newly-constituted militias by the city governments, which was subsequently granted. In this early phase there was a happy cooperation between the Patriots and the anti-Orangist regenten, because of their common interest in diminishing the powers of the stadtholder. In Holland province his advantage of exercising command of the Hague garrison of the States Army was offset by the power of the Free Corps in most cities, and the latter had the additional advantage of providing a defense against the usual Orangist weapon of threatened mob violence, because the middle-class Patriots feared the city paupers as much as the regenten did, and formed a common front against the poor. And not without reason, because in several cities, there were Orangist-inspired riots by members of the working class, like the riots in Rotterdam in 1783 and the Hague in 1784, led by the fish-monger Kaat Mussel. (Note: Kaat Mussel was active until the Patriots felt strong enough to have her arrested in June of 1785. Then she was publicly flogged as a "disturber of the peace" and put in jail. She was released in 1787; Schama, p. 88; Geyl (1947), p. 91) On 3 April 1784 such a riot was bloodily suppressed by a Free-Corps company in Rotterdam, when a panicky officer ordered his men to open fire on the mob, which resulted in several people killed. Initially, the officer was blamed, but (due to the fact that more and more riots occurred) the States of Holland later exonerated the Free Corps and blamed the Orangist rioters.

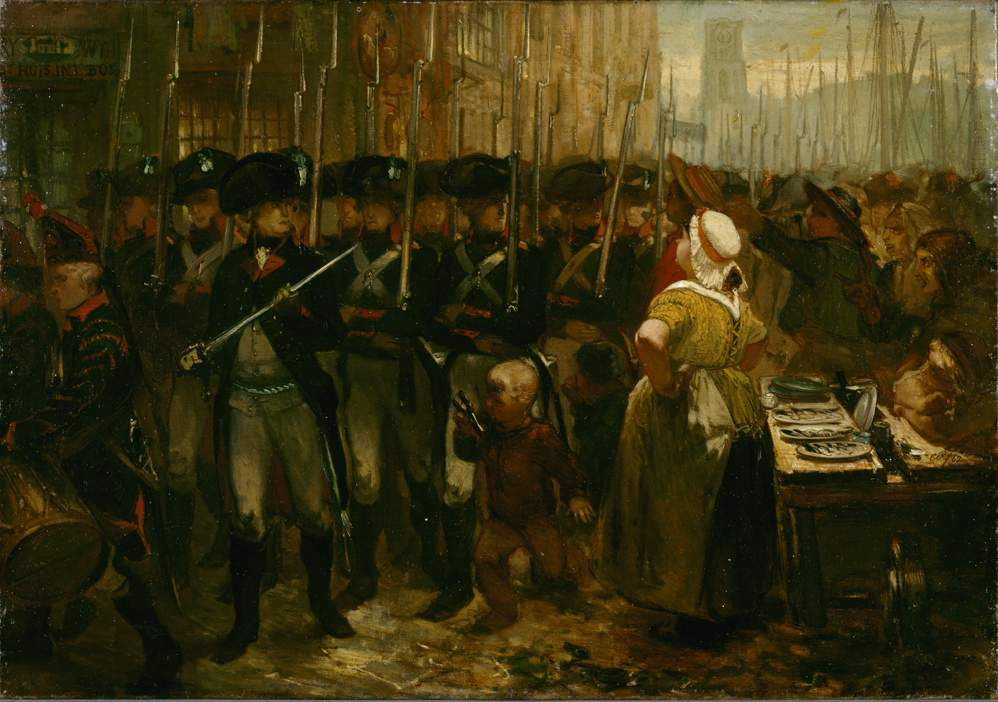
Orangists taunt Elsevier's Free Corps in Rotterdam, 1785.

The Free Corps were a local phenomenon, limited to the areas where the Patriot movement was strong, partly because the Patriot ideology for a very long time respected the confederal structure of the Dutch Republic. They remained "federal" democrats. But from the end of 1784 they started to organize on a national level. In December the first congress of representatives of a federation of Free Corps assembled in Utrecht. This was soon followed by the second congress on 25 February 1785, which commissioned the Leiden Free Corps to draft a manifesto. This manifesto was adopted during the third congress, again in Utrecht on 14 June 1785. It took the form of a solemn Acte van Verbintenis ter verdediging der Republicainsche constitutie (Act of Association for the defense of the Republican constitution, or "Act of Association" for short) in which the members of the Free Corps pledged to support each other against attempts at suppression by the civil authorities and against attacks by Orangist mobs. Also the Act for the first time established Volksregering bij representatie (People's government by representation) as the ultimate goal of the Free Corps movement. (Note: The text of the Act is reproduced by Colenbrander in vol. II of Patriottentijd, Appendix 2 to chapter IV, pp. 366-367) But this was only the first such manifesto.

The Leids Ontwerp (Leiden Draft), another important Patriot manifesto, was drawn up after the Leiden exercitiegenootschap was prohibited from performing its drill maneuvers on 23 July 1785 by the city government. In response a congress of the representatives of the Holland exercitiegenootschappen commissioned a group of members, among whom Wybo Fijnje, Pieter Vreede, and Rutger Jan Schimmelpenninck to write the manifesto along the lines of the draft they discussed in a meeting on 4 October 1785. This resulted in the publication of the manifesto, entitled Ontwerp om de Republiek door eene heilzaame Vereeniging van Belangen van Regent en Burger van Binnen Gelukkig en van Buiten Gedugt te maaken", Leiden, aangenomen bij besluit van de Provinciale Vergadering van de Gewapende Corpsen in Holland, op 4 oktober 1785 te Leiden (Design to make the Republic inwardly contented and outwardly feared by a salutary union of interests of Regent and Citizen, etc.) in which among other things the abolition of the right of approval of city-government appointments of the stadtholder was proposed, to be replaced by democratic elections.

=== Overturning the old order in Utrecht and Amsterdam ===
Implementing the Patriot manifestos brought a fundamental rift between the "democratic" and "aristocratic" wings of the Patriot movement to light. Initially both saw a common interest and a basis for cooperation (as the Leiden Draft explicitly proposes). This was exemplified by the Utrecht example where in July 1783 the vroedschap acceded to the demand of the local Free Corps to be recognized as the new manifestation of the schutterij under the direction of an elected Burgher Defense Council. Both factions were opposed to the 1674 Government Regulation (Note: Imposed by the States General in 1674 at the occasion of the readmission of Utrecht province to the Union, after the French occupation was lifted, as a punishment for the city's meek submission to the French during the invasion of 1672; Israel, pp. 798, 814-815. It was suspended during the stadtholderless era after 1702, but reimposed after the Orangist revolution of 1748) that gave extensive powers to the stadtholder to appoint city magistrates. This was a standing invitation to abuse. Nicolaas de Pesters, schepen of Utrecht, was infamous for his abuse of political patronage. The matter came to a head when in January 1783 a member of the Utrecht vroedschap (i.e. a regent) proposed to disavow the appointment rights of the stadtholder, and in August 1783 a petition of members of the newly reconstituted schutterij urged the vroedschap to no longer brook such interference. Attempts to come to an understanding with the stadtholder in the fall of 1783 failed, because the latter insisted on his "due rights." Then in January 1784 an occasion presented itself to test the stadtholder's resolve, when a vacancy in the vroedschap occurred. The regenten accepted the challenge and, studiously ignoring the stadtholder, appointed a moderate member of the schutterij to the vacant post.

But the honeymoon between the "democrats" and "aristocrats" did not last. On 23 April 1784 a draft of a new "constitution" for Utrecht province, to replace the 1674 Regulation, was published in the Utrecht Patriot newspaper Utrechtse Courant, after the Utrecht States had imprudently invited all citizens to lodge their objections to the Regulations in early 1784. This draft of 117 articles proposed that henceforth the Utrecht city vroedschap was to be popularly elected under a form of census suffrage in indirect elections. This relatively moderate proposal directly attacked the co-option rights of the regenten. Another objectionable proposal was the institution of an elected body of 16 burgher representatives to sit in permanent session to hear and address grievances of citizens against the city government. The regenten were not about to let go of their powers without a fight, but instead of getting into a direct confrontation with the democrats they at first tried to drown the proposal in red tape. The States drafted a far more conservative counter-proposal and tried to push this through by subterfuge. This elicited a strong response of the Utrecht schutterij in the form of a petition opposing that counter-draft. The schutterij also elected a group of 24 representatives (among whom Ondaatje), which called themselves the "Constituted," to conduct direct negotiations with the vroedschap. The Constituted soon set themselves up as a rival power center to the vroedschap, and started acting like the proposed Burgher Council from the draft-constitution.

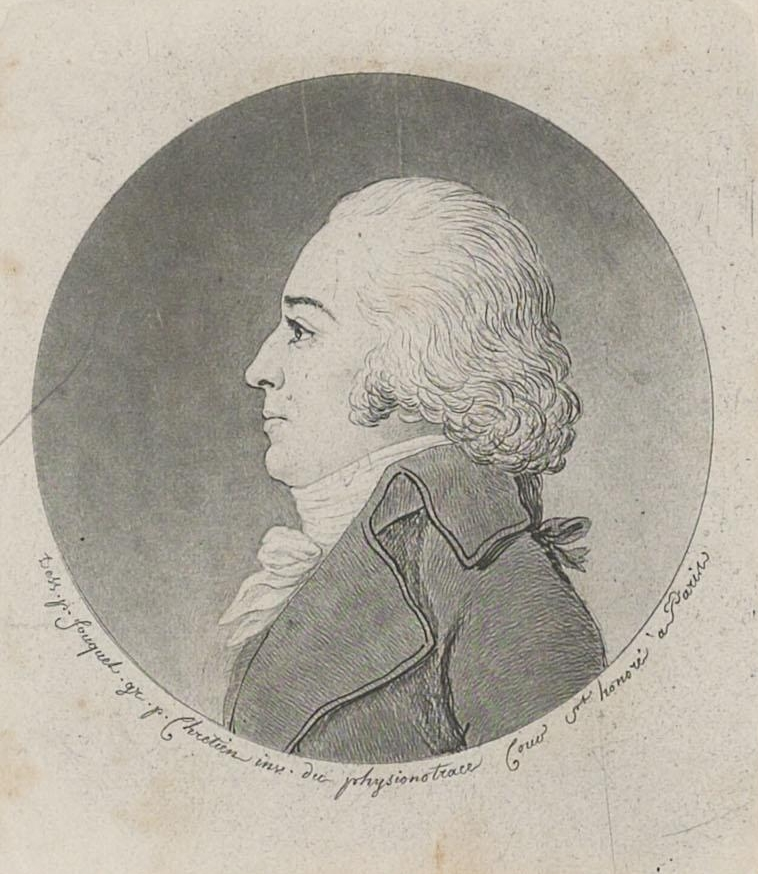
Quint Ondaatje

The negotiations fruitlessly dragged on and in January 1785 six companies of the schutterij approached the Constituted to urge them to take more drastic steps. The irate "shooters" elected a new group of representatives, called the "Commissioned," to permanently ensure the zeal of the Constituted. The vroedschap grudgingly accepted the Constituted as permanent representatives of the schutterij on 21 February 1785, (Note: Note that this was during the second congress of the federation of Free Corps, when many Free Corps members from elsewhere were congregated in the city.) but made no further concessions. But then fate intervened, another member of the vroedschap died and the Constituted and Commissioned petitioned the vroedschap to fill the vacancy with someone sympathetic to their cause. The vroedschap then went out of its way to appoint someone the petitioners had already declared "unacceptable", one Jonathan Sichterman.

The train of events that then was set in motion could be considered a "paradigm" for revolutionary "journées" (Note: In the sense of the "journées" of the revolutionary French National Guards, like the Demonstration of 20 June 1792 and the journée du 10 août (1792); cf. Schama who wrote histories of both the Dutch and the French revolutions, and noted the similarities; Schama, p. 98) that would be followed in similar circumstances in Utrecht itself, and in other Dutch cities in the following two years. First the city government would commit some kind of "provocation" that would enrage the Free Corps members and other Patriots. The democrats would work themselves into a lather, whipped up by seditious pamphlets and speeches. Then they would march to the town hall and assemble, with their weapons, in the town square, which they would easily fill with their large numbers. The city fathers would be summoned to come to the town hall and would be more or less locked up in their meeting room. They would not be physically assaulted (even provided with food and drink), but the psychological pressure of the threatening crowd, and the threats that "it would be impossible to constrain them, if the demands were not met" would soon convince them to give in. But once everybody had returned home in triumph, the city fathers would regain their courage, and renege on their promises "as these had been forced under duress." And a new cycle would soon commence.

Something like this happened on 11–12 March 1785 in Utrecht, when agitators like Ondaatje whipped the crowd into a frenzy; the Utrecht city hall was surrounded by 2,000 angry Free Corps men and the Utrecht vroedschap reluctantly agreed to withdraw Sicherman's appointment after Ondaatje made clear that the Constituted would not be fobbed off. "We are not '48-ers," he declared, "but 85-ers, who understand our rights and liberties well enough, ... we are not canaille" referring to a similar event during the revolution of 1748, when the Doelisten had indeed been fobbed off by the then-stadtholder. But the reaction was swift: 17 members of the vroedschap resigned in protest, and soon a petition of notable citizens was sent to the States with a request to intervene. The States excoriated Ondaatje and his mob and manage to intimidate Ondaatje sufficiently to elicit a humble apology. On 23 March the 19 vroedschap members reoccupied their seats, and opened criminal proceedings against Ondaatje and other instigators of the events of 11 March. Sicherman could have his appointment back, but he declined; the council therefore left the vacancy unfilled.

But the democrats were back in August and again in September with demonstrations following the established paradigm. Eventually, end December 1785, things came to a head when in a final demonstration of Free Corps strength the vroedschap was forced to capitulate. On 20 December they promised to adopt a democratic city constitution within three months. And indeed, on 20 March 1786, while the Free Corps again occupied the central square in silent menace, while a blizzard blew, the vroedschap allowed several of its members to formally abjure the old Government Regulation. On 2 August 1786 an elected Burgher College was installed as the new city council.

In the spring of 1787 similar events took place in Amsterdam. The political situation in that city had long been very different than in Utrecht. The Amsterdam regenten belonged to the old States-Party faction and were as such opposed to the stadtholder long before the Patriot movement started to rear its head. Its pensionary, Engelbert François van Berckel, together with the pensionaries of Dordrecht (Cornelis de Gijselaar) and of Haarlem (Adriaan van Zeebergh) formed an anti-stadtholderian triumvirate in the States of Holland during the days of the war with Great Britain. But this was all based on the interests of Amsterdam as a mercantile city. The Amsterdam regenten were in no mood for "democratic" experiments that would undermine their privileges. The more the democrats gained influence in other cities, the more the Amsterdam regenten drew closer to their Orangist enemies, and the stadtholder's regime. Van Berckel lost the initiative to Orangist regenten like Joachim Rendorp, and Willem Gerrit Dedel Salomonsz, who formed an Orangist minority within the Amsterdam vroedschap. Amsterdam had a large Free Corps, consisting of 55 companies, but the old schutterij, under Orangist command, was still a rival armed force. Besides, the Patriots did not have a monopoly on mob violence, as the workers in the Amsterdam shipbuilding industry, the so-called Bijltjes ("Ax-men"), were a strongly pro-Orange political force in the city. Patriot political clubs were rivaled by Orangist political clubs. In sum, the political forces were more evenly balanced than in other cities. And this paralyzed the Amsterdam vroedschap in the spring of 1787.

Things came to a head in February 1787 when a group of Free-Corps officers, led by a Colonel Isaac van Goudoever forced entry to the council chamber in protest against an anti-Patriot move Dedel had engineered. Only the intervention of Hendrik Daniëlsz Hooft, a venerable burgemeester prevented a fracas. On 3 April Goudoever returned at the head of 102 officers to demand that henceforth Amsterdam would only be represented by its pensionaries Van Berckel and Visscher (who were both trusted by the Patriots) in the States of Holland. Dedel replied with an attempt to come to an arrangement with the stadtholder in which Amsterdam would align itself with the stadtholderian regime in exchange for concessions by the stadtholder on the point of his right of appointment (which the States-Party regenten had always opposed), and his help with mobilizing the Bijltjes. This conspiracy failed due to the obduracy of the stadtholder, but on 20 April 1787 an incendiary pamphlet, entitled Het Verraad Ontdekt ("The Treason Discovered"), made it public, and this incensed the Patriots. That night the city was abuzz with fervid Patriot activity. The Burgher Defense Council, which commanded the Free Corps, organised a petition (the "Act of Qualification") which was signed by 16,000 people, and the next day the Dam Square before the city hall was thronged with thousands of guild members, Patriot citizens and armed militiamen. The Amsterdam council was once more locked in chambers, not expected to emerge without a positive decision, and on the initiative of Hooft the vroedschap was purged of the members whose dismissal had been demanded in the Act of Qualification. Amsterdam had belatedly joined the Patriot coalition. The rioting of the Bijltjes (Note: This so-called Bijltjesoproer (insurrection of the "Little Axes") is actually a misnomer as the Bijltjes reacted to attacks by Patriots on Orangist clubs in the center of Amsterdam, and the Bijltjes rioted in reprisal, only to be attacked and suppressed by armed Patriots.) on 30 May 1787 did not change this. William May had to flee across the IJ.

Other cities in Holland that had been holding out, like Rotterdam, where Pieter Paulus finally managed a purge of the vroedschap, and several cities, like Delft, Dordrecht, Alkmaar, Hoorn, and Monnikendam were helped along by the "Flying Legion", a corps of 300 Free Corps members, and 200 horses, led by Adam Gerard Mappa, threatening violence. Delft's "liberation" gave the Patriots command of the largest arsenal in Holland province in the summer of 1787.

=== A creeping civil war ===
It is true that compared to the French revolution the Patriot revolution was singularly bloodless and that widespread military maneuvering remained the exception. But there actually were military actions by regular forces on both sides, aimed at deciding the issue by military means, and blood was spilled in battle. To understand how this came about, it is important first to understand the way the forces on both sides were distributed in the seven provinces and the Generality Lands. The States Army, commanded by the stadtholder, was a mercenary army, paid for by the several provinces according to a formula for apportionment, called the repartitie. Holland paid for more than half of the troops, and it was known which regiments belonged to its repartitie, though this had no consequences for the operational command, as the army was an institution of the Republic as a whole. The troops were in peacetime usually divided over a number of garrisons in different parts of the country. These garrisons played an important role in local politics, as the officers were Orangists to a man, and the troops in the whole felt a strong allegiance to the stadtholder. The garrison cities, like Nijmegen in Gelderland, The Hague in Holland, and 'Hertogenbosch in "States Brabant" were strongpoints of Orangist influence, even though the surrounding provinces might tend to favor the Patriots. So even without explicitly threatening military violence, the army played an important role in local politics.

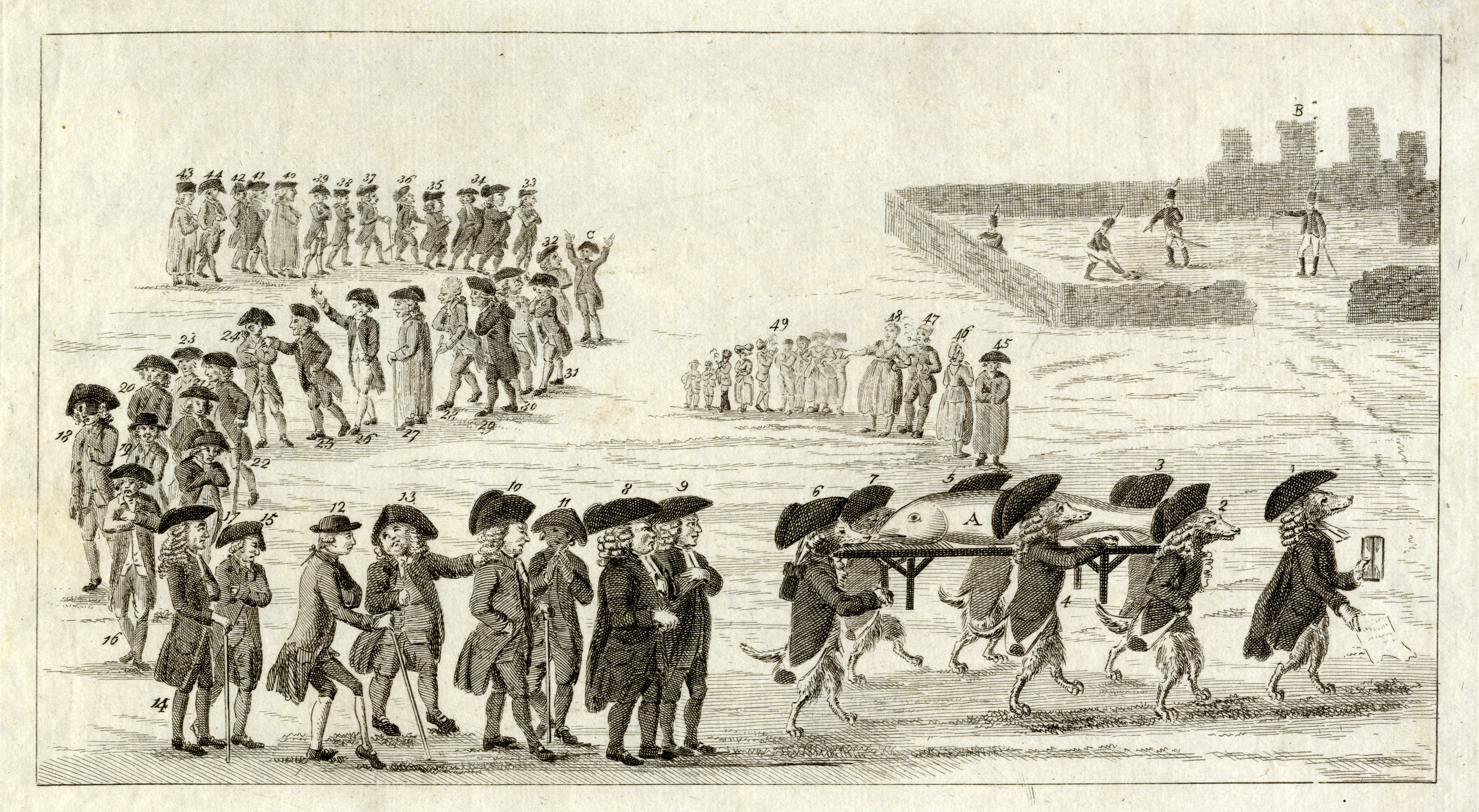
Image of a procession of numbered people on their way to a cemetery. Cartoon on the Rhinegrave Salm and his defense of the city of Utrecht

Before 1784 the States army was the only official standing army in the Republic, but during the so-called Kettle War, a minor military conflict with the Austrian emperor and sovereign of the Austrian Netherlands, Joseph II, the States of Holland lost confidence in the States army under the wavering command of the stadtholder, and decided to raise a separate military formation of brigade strength, outside the States army, under the command of the Rhinegrave of Salm-Grumbach, an officer in the States army, for its own account. This so-called "Legion of Salm" was not subject to the stadtholder as Captain-General of the States army. After the crisis passed, the States of Holland decided to abolish it, as an austerity measure, but several Holland cities, Amsterdam among them, decided to take over the financing for their own account, so that from 1785 on the Legion continued in being as a military unit that was not part of the official military command structure, and also not part of the Free Corps federation, because the members of the Legion were mercenaries, just like the soldiers of the army. The Legion did not play a role, until the Rhinegrave in September 1786 became commander-in-chief of all forces of the province of Holland, including the States army troops under the Holland repartitie, and later also the Free Corps in the provinces of Holland and Utrecht.

The events that gave rise to this development were the following. In September 1785, after a number of riots between Patriots and Orangists in The Hague during the summer of that year, the States of Holland (by then with a slender majority of cities tending toward the Patriot side) decided to deprive the stadtholder of his command of the strong Hague garrison of the States army (though this was only formalized in July 1786). On 15 September 1785 he therefore decided to leave the city and to repair to the Het Loo Palace in Gelderland with his family. Around the same time things had come to a head in Utrecht city and part of the States of Utrecht decided to move to the city of Amersfoort, causing a schism in the States, as the representatives of the city of Utrecht and several other cities remained in Utrecht city. The Amersfoort States subsequently asked the stadtholder to put a garrison of States army troops in Amersfoort and Zeist, which was done in September 1785 with a cavalry division from the Nijmegen garrison.

This remained the status quo until in May 1786 the vroedschappen of the Gelderland cities of Hattem and Elburg refused to seat a number of Orangist candidates in defiance of the stadtholder's right of appointment, and with help of Patriot Free Corps of Kampen, Overijssel, Zwolle and Zutphen started to fortify the cities under the command of the young firebrand Patriot Herman Willem Daendels, a Hattem native. (Note: Daendels' father had been a member of the vroedschap of Hattem, giving him a "right" to succeed his father at his death. But this appointment had been blocked by the stadtholder; Cf. Geyl (1947), p. 141) The pro-Orangist States of Gelderland then asked the stadtholder to lend a hand in suppressing this "insurrection" and on 4 September a task-force of the Nijmegen garrison duly marched to Hattem and entered that city over light opposition the next day. The troops were allowed to loot the two small cities and desecrate the local churches. Stadtholder William V is said to have exclaimed on the news of the success of the operation: "Have they be hanged? Hell and Damnation. Why not hang the Satan's children?".

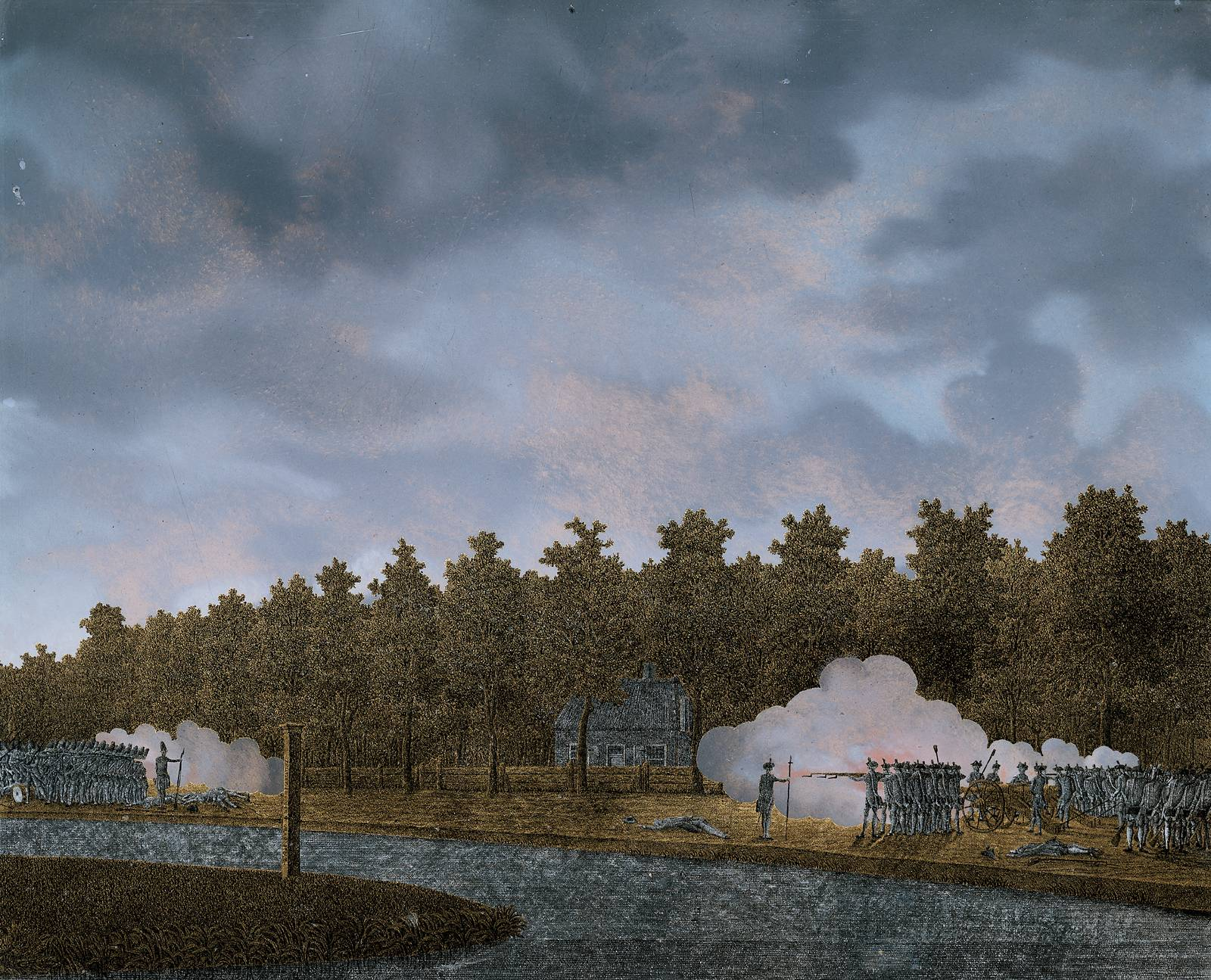
Jonas Zeuner "Firefight on the Vaartse Rijn". Patriots won the Battle of Jutphaas near Utrecht on 9 May 1787.

The "Hattem and Elburg events" electrified the Patriot opposition. Pensionary de Gijselaar (calling the stadtholder "a new Alva") demanded in the States of Holland that the stadtholder would be deprived of his command as Captain-General of the States army (which only the States General could do), and in any case take the troops on the Holland repartitie out of the States army. When this was done this deprived the stadtholder of more than half of his troops, effectively denying him the military means to decide the political conflict. Holland also made a pact with the Utrecht States and the Overijssel cities (the Overijssel States were hopelessly divided) to form a so-called "Cordon" to defend these provinces against military depredations of the rump-States army. The overall command of this Cordon was given to a military commission, headquartered in Woerden, while the Holland troops were put under the command of the Rhinegrave of Salm. Another important political development was that the Amsterdam regenten (still not purged of the Orangist minority) formally adhered to the Act of Association that the Free Corps had promulgated in the summer of 1785.

In Utrecht city the Patriots feared an attack from the Amersfoort and Zeist troops, and started to fortify the city against a siege. The defenders received reinforcements from Holland and other Patriot strongholds, so that by the spring of 1787 they numbered 6,000. When the Utrecht Defense Council learned that the States army had sent a task-force to occupy the hamlet of Vreeswijk near a strategically important sluice (useful to defensively inundate the surrounding countryside) they decided to force a confrontation. On 9 May 1787 the Patriot force under the command of the Utrecht vroedschap member Jean Antoine d'Averhoult attacked the States-army force in the Battle of Jutphaas, and despite several people killed, routed the mercenaries. Though this was only a skirmish, the Patriot propaganda made hay of the victory and the officer killed received a state funeral.

=== Foreign interference ===
The Patriot Revolt did not take place in a diplomatic vacuum. (Note: Though Colenbrander in particular, and the foreign diplomats themselves, have a tendency to exaggerate foreign influences, demoting the Dutch protagonists to mere puppets Dutch historian Pieter Geyl warned that this is an exaggeration and that the foreign influence should not be overrated. Cf. Geyl (1950), pp. 30-33) The Dutch Republic had from its inception been a battlefield of Great Power diplomacy in which the Holland regenten (lately in the guise of the States Party) had been sympathetic to France, and the Orangists usually favored the British. Since the 1688 Glorious Revolution followed by a 1689 naval treaty, the Dutch had been in nominal alliance with the British, while the diplomatic relations with France had been strained due to the Franco-Dutch War and the War of the Austrian Succession. Dutch relations with France had, however, markedly improved during the era of the American Revolutionary War, when the Dutch at first profited from their "neutral-flag" trade of contraband goods with the French and Americans, and later fought alongside the French against the British during the Fourth Anglo-Dutch War that had recently ended. Franco-Dutch relations became even better when France offered its good offices, both to obtain the 1784 treaty of Paris with Great Britain that ended the war, and subsequently to obtain peace with emperor Joseph II, that ended the Kettle War with the Treaty of Fontainebleau. Shortly after that, special envoy Gerard Brantsen, a moderate Patriot, crowned this with the treaty of amity and commerce with France of October 1785.

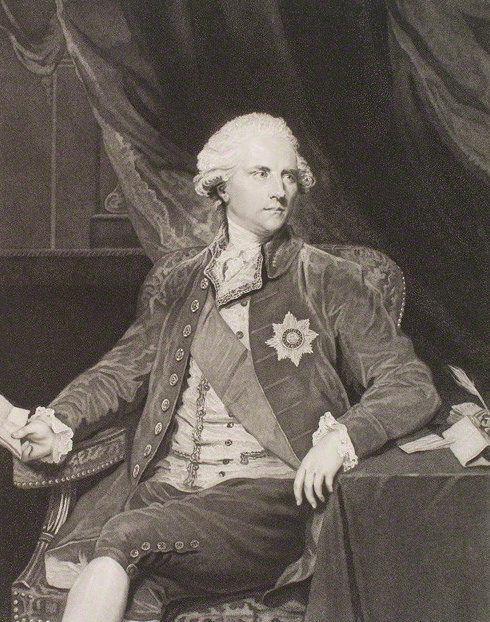
Portrait of Sir James Harris, British Ambassador to The Hague (by Caroline Watson, after Joshua Reynolds)

One person who observed this thaw in Franco-Dutch diplomatic relations with great alarm was the new British ambassador to The Hague, accredited since 1784, Sir James Harris. Harris had a tendency to see French conspiracies everywhere, and in the Dutch case he may have been right. Because the French saw the discomfiture of the Dutch stadtholder with great pleasure, although their enthusiasm was limited to the advance of their old friends, the Amsterdam States Party regenten; they were far less enthusiastic about the democratic designs of the other wing of the Patriot party. With the support of the Cabinet of William Pitt the Younger Harris set about to reestablish British influence in the Dutch Republic, and he did not always limit himself to diplomatic means. One important task was to shore up the morale of the dispirited stadtholder after his departure from The Hague in September 1785. William at that time had two options: either to give in to the Patriot demands and accept some kind of compromise as to the Government Regulations, or to hold on to his "due rights" at any cost. The latter was his favorite option (he was wont to quote the maxim Aut Caesar, aut nihil) and Harris, in concert with William's wife Wilhelmina of Prussia, (Note: A nice piece of trivia about her is that she was a Princess of Orange both through her marriage with William, and in her own right as a descendant in the female line of Frederick Henry, Prince of Orange. In fact the Treaty of Partition that the heads of the House of Orange-Nassau and the House of Hohenzollern (both descendants in female lines, by different daughters of Frederick Henry) concluded in Berlin in 1732, gave the heads of both Houses the right to use the title Prince of Orange.) encouraged him to take this option. But Harris did far more: he was supplied with ample funds from the British Secret Service and he used that money to buy influence left and right, beginning with a generous pension-with-strings-attached of £4,000 per annum for the stadtholder himself. Ably assisted by "confidential agents", of which baron Hendrik August van Kinckel is the best known, he used these funds to subsidize the establishment of Orangist Free Corps in provinces like Zeeland and Friesland where the Orangists were in the majority, which were used to intimidate the Patriot minorities in these provinces. He tried to lure the conservative regenten in Amsterdam away from their anti-Orangist stance with promises of trade concessions by Britain, and promises of concessions from the stadtholder that would safeguard their own privileges, but avoid any "democratic" experiments.

But Harris' most important ploy was an attempt to engineer an alliance with Prussia that would thwart the "French designs". This would kill two birds with one stone: it would keep the stadtholder in power, and it would renew the Anglo-Prussian alliance that had existed during the Seven Years' War. To that end he visited the aging king Frederick the Great of Prussia, Wilhelmina's uncle, in August 1785 in Berlin. But Frederick was loath to endanger good relations with France, and refused to take the bait. "The pear is not ripe," the old king remarked cryptically.

Instead Prussia in concert with France attempted to mediate between the warring parties in the Republic. To that end both countries sent mediators, the ambassadors Vérac and Thulemeyer, who repeatedly attempted to bring the moderates to compromise. For instance, in 1785 they proposed that the stadtholder would cede his military powers to a council, with the Princess, the pensionaries, and the leaders of both the Orangist and "aristocratic" Patriot factions as members (only the democrats would be excluded). But William refused to budge on his "due rights" and without that the Patriots would not budge either.

In 1786 a Prussian minister, Johann von Goertz, came to The Hague with a proposal that might even be acceptable to the democrats, but Harris easily convinced William, already in great spirits after the events of Hattem and Elburg, that this would amount to a "capitulation" and the stadtholder appended conditions that were unacceptable to the Patriots. In other words, Harris was a constant obstacle to any attempts at a peaceful solution.

In any case, Frederick the Great died in August 1786, and was succeeded by his nephew (Wilhelmina's elder brother) Frederick William II of Prussia. Though the new king was not keen to go to war with France, he was less determined to avoid such a development than the old king, and from then on Harris' designs to let the Prussians do the fighting on behalf of Great Britain stood a better chance. And the French game of egging on the Patriots on the one hand, and keeping them in check on the other, became more risky. The French opposite number of von Goertz, the marquis de Rayneval, understood this, and also that a victory of the democrats in the Republic would be against French interests; France became less and less enthusiastic about favoring the Patriots.

Harris meanwhile went on with his policy of confrontation, that stood a better chance of success as also the French foreign minister Vergennes died in February 1787. With both Frederick the Great and Vergennes out of the way it was far more likely that France would allow a Prussian military intervention without a major European conflagration. Between 13 and 18 May 1787 (so shortly after the Battle of Jutphaas) a conference of Orangist notables was held in Nijmegen to decide on a strategy of confrontation. Harris stood ready with a subsidy of £70,000, ostensibly as a loan to the Orangist States of Gelderland), but in reality as a slush fund to finance the Orangist Free Corps, to be used in street rioting, and to buy the favors of the vacillating Overijssel cities to leave the Patriot camp. A kind of de facto "declaration of war" (the Declaratoir (Note: This document was drafted by the tutor of William's young sons, the professor at the University of Harderwijk, Herman Tollius. It was a lengthy and rambling document that among others ordered the founding of a "bureau of correspondence" at The Hague to coordinate the activities of Orangist Free Corps and to organise petition drives; it berated the States of Holland and their Patriot majority and offered the support of the stadtholder to their opponents; and it demanded the restoration of the stadtholder to his office of Captain-General; Cf. Colenbrander, vol. III, pp. 203-204)) was reluctantly signed by the stadtholder on 26 May 1787.

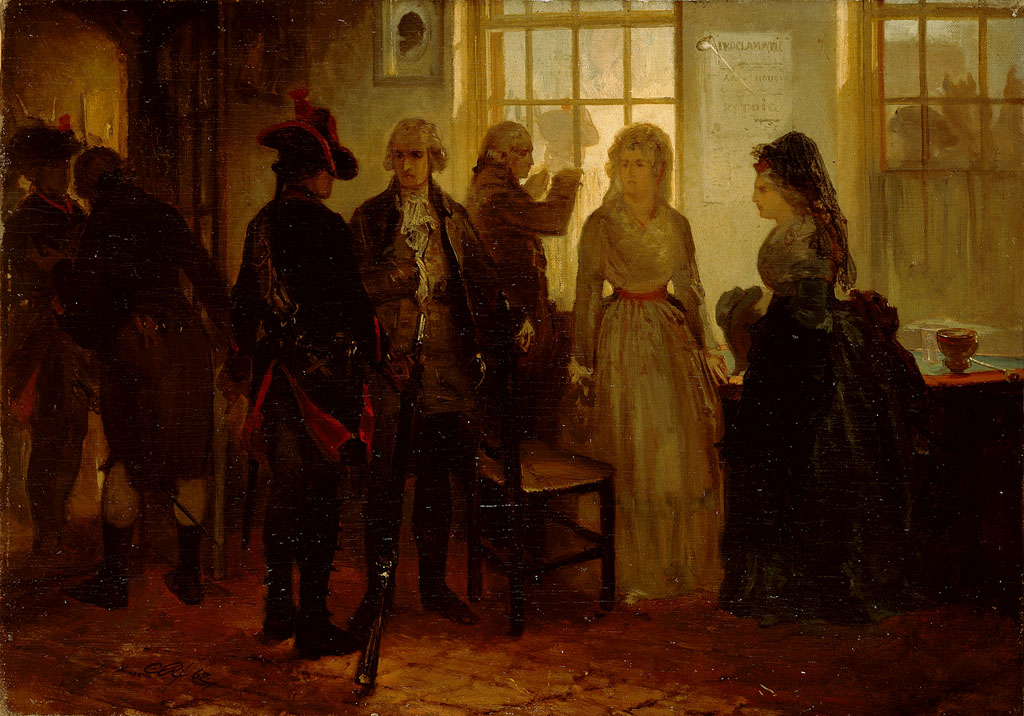
The arrest of Wilhelmina of Prussia

Then, completely unexpected, an event happened that played into Harris' hands. Harris had convinced Princess Wilhelmina that the Orangist forces in The Hague had become strong enough that it might be possible to wrest that city from the hands of the Patriots. Audacious where her husband was irresolute, she decided to make an appearance in The Hague to bring matters to a boil. To that end she planned a trip with a small entourage, but without an armed escort, from Nijmegen to The Hague by way of a route close to the Patriot stronghold of Gouda on 28 June 1787. Fresh horses had been ordered for her carriages at several stops underway, thereby advertising her planned route. To make certain that the Patriots would be aware of what was afoot, several Orangist agents "let slip" to everyone that would be interested, that the Princess was about to pass by. It was therefore no surprise that she was intercepted by a patrol of the Gouda Free Corps near the Goejanverwellesluis in the hamlet of Bonrepas. The Princess was not harmed and she was soon allowed to return to Nijmegen, but the fact that her captors had been impolite (one of them sat unbidden at her dinner table, which was a serious breach of etiquette; another stood with a drawn sabre in her presence) caused great consternation and outrage. Especially her brother the Prussian king now lost his patience with the Patriots, and the Dutch in general, and demanded in a first ultimatum to the States General the immediate reinstatement of the Princess in The Hague, and the exemplary punishment of the culprits of the Lèse-majesté. The States of Holland were less than impressed and urged that the ultimatum would be huffily ignored.

Now the French played a dangerous game. Vergennes' successor Montmorin gave the impression that France would support the Patriots in case of Prussian military intervention and that to this end a military camp was being prepared in Givet, on an invasion route through the independent Prince-Bishopric of Liège, obviating the necessity of entering the Austrian Netherlands. This turned out to be a bluff, and once this became clear to the Prussians and Harris, nothing prevented an invasion of the Republic. But the Patriots, informed of the French intervention plans by yet another French envoy Jean-François de Bourgoing believed in the Givet camp till it was too late, and it steeped them in their resistance to the Prussian demands. An invasion force of around 26,000 Prussian troops under the command of the duke of Brunswick (a nephew of William's old mentor) entered the Republic on 13 September 1787, after a final ultimatum was again left unanswered.

Despite all the martiality of the Free Corps their resistance proved to be negligible. The armed camp of Utrecht, where the Rhinegrave of Salm had personally assumed command a few months earlier, was evacuated without a fight, after Salm on 14 September convinced the Military Commission in Woerden that it was a rat trap, about to be encircled by two Prussian pincers, and that it was strategically necessary to retreat to Amsterdam. This earned the Rhinegrave the enduring opprobrium of the Patriots and all Dutch historians, but he was probably right. The retreat proved, however, a death blow to Patriot morale. Though the Patriots indeed made a stand around Amsterdam (without Salm, however, who was replaced by a French officer, Jean Baptiste Ternant). The Prussians attacked on 1 October and the city capitulated on the 10th, after the French had intimated that no assistance would be forthcoming.

== Aftermath ==
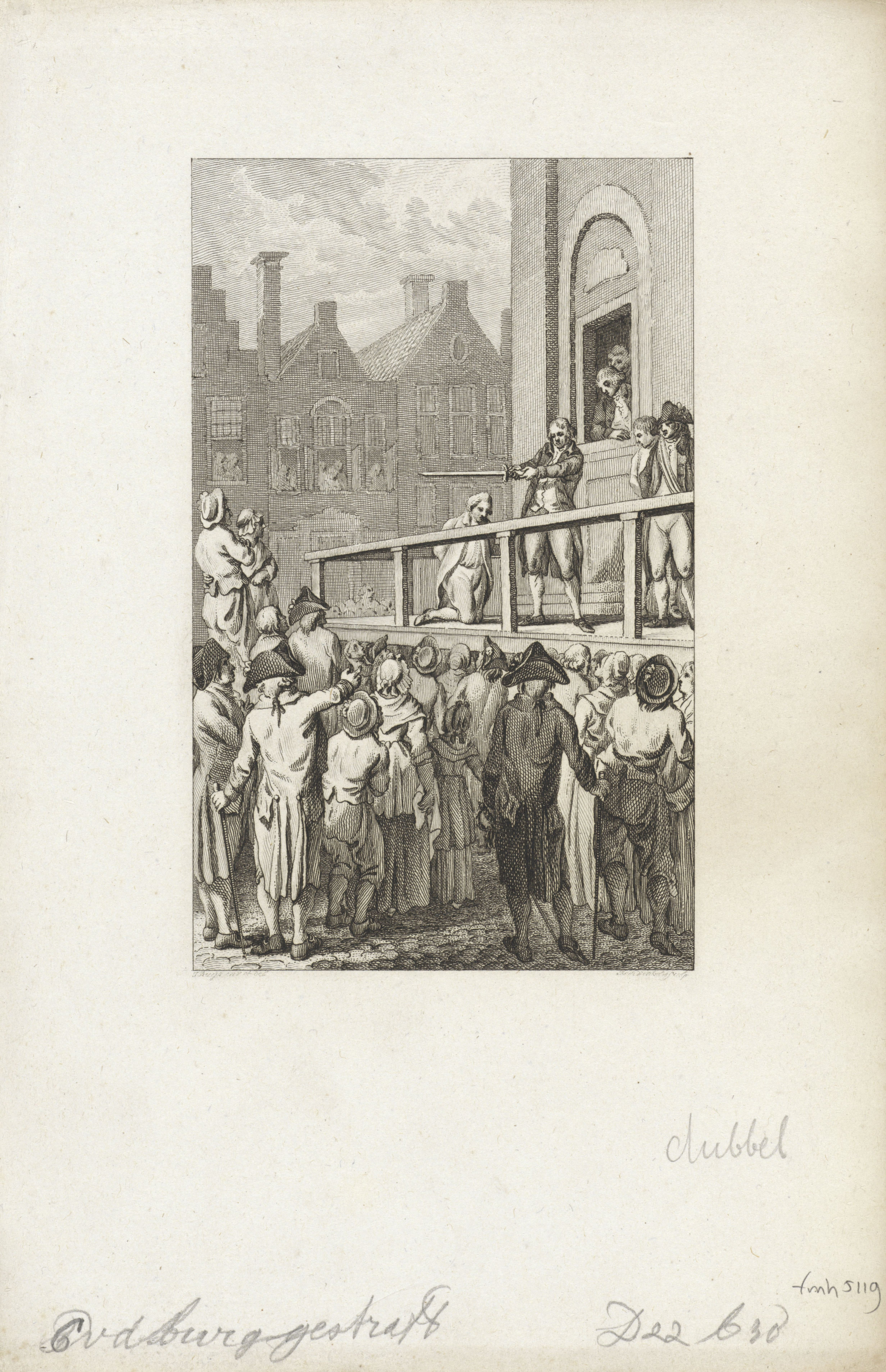
Mock execution of Patriot ex-burgemeester of Bolsward Cornelis van der Burgh at Leeuwarden on 16 May 1789 by Reinier Vinkeles (Note: Van der Burgh was sentenced to 20 years of exile, but only after the executioner had swung his sword over his head in a degrading mock execution.)

The stadtholder returned to The Hague on 20 September 1787 at the head of the States-army troops that had marched together with the triumphant Prussian army. A purge of the States of Holland and the States General, both institutions who had their seat in The Hague, started immediately. The immediate result was that Mappa, who was in charge of the fortress town of Naarden was ordered by the reconstituted States of Holland to surrender it to the Prussians, which he did on 27 September.

Even before the return of the stadtholder the Holland ridderschap (Note: The College of Nobles that had one vote in the States of Holland and was chaired by the Grand Pensionary.) had taken the initiative to have the States repeal all legislation of the preceding years with a "Patriot" imprint. The "Orange Restoration" proceeded apace. Everywhere the Patriot members of the local vroedschappen and city magistracies were purged. The Grand Pensionary of Holland Pieter van Bleiswijk (who had chosen the Patriot side in 1785) was replaced by his Zeeland colleague Laurens Pieter van de Spiegel in November 1787. On the instruction of Princess Wilhelmina and ambassador Harris he started criminal proceedings against a number of Patriot leaders on a list Wilhelmina provided, like Robert Jasper van der Capellen, two burgemeesters, and two Elburg ministers, who were all sentenced to death in absentia. Daendels and Ondaatje were sentenced to perpetual banishment, as were a number of other Patriot leaders. A limited Amnesty was declared in November 1787, but the "extra-judicial" persecution of Patriots was more effective anyway: in Gouda 200 houses were looted by the Orangist mob; in 's Hertogenbosch 829; in Utrecht the bill ran to one million guilders.

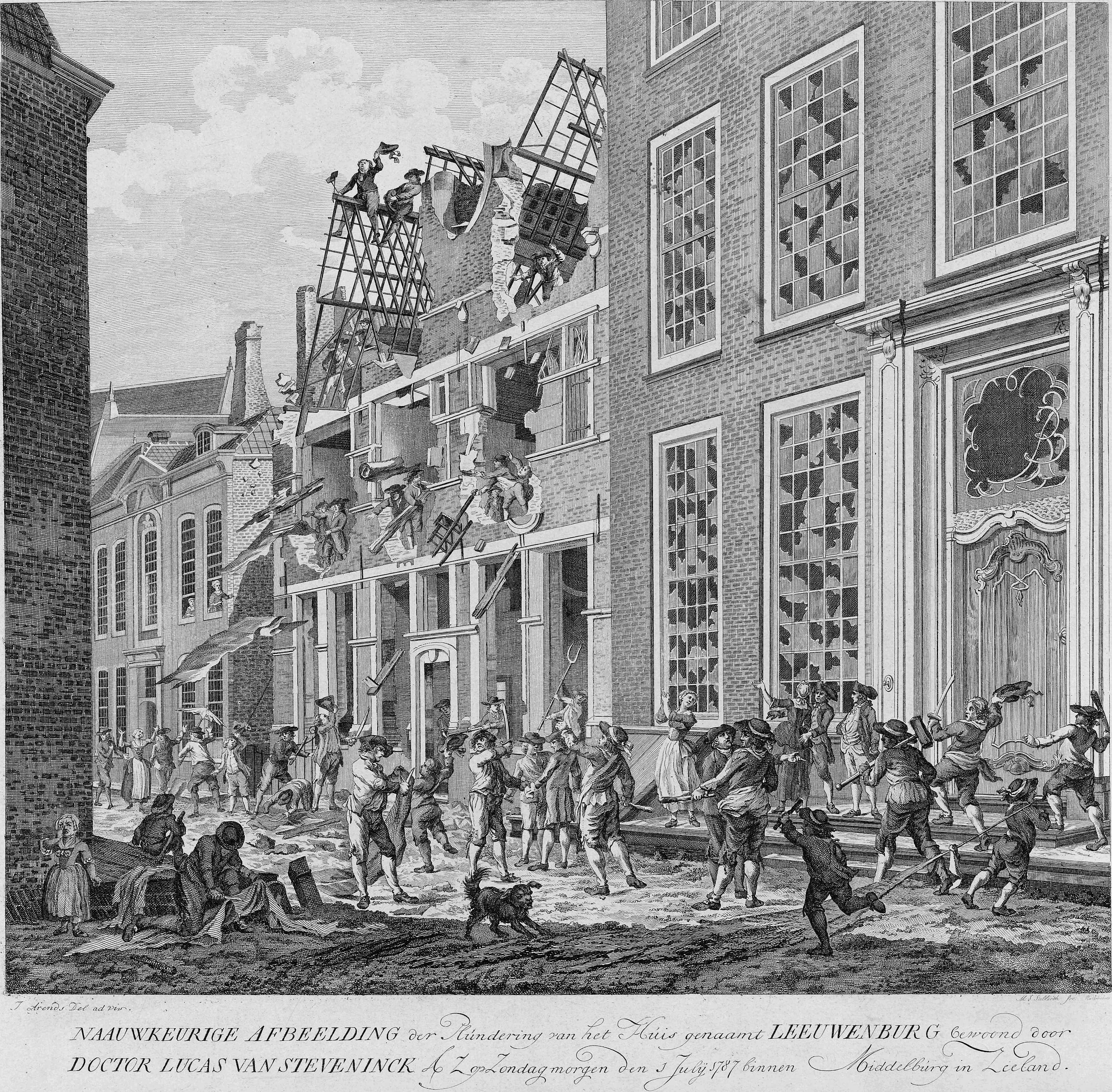
Mathias de Sallieth Looting of a Patriot's dwelling. (Note: Actually, the picture shows the sack of the house of Lucas van Steveninck, a Middelburg physician and Patriot on 1 July 1787, so before the Prussian invasion. Van Steveninck and his servants tried to defend the house against an Orangist mob, but when the besiegers brought on a field gun, provided by the garrison, Van Stevenicnck had to flee for his life; cf. Schama, p. 119)

More than 40,000 Patriots (including women and children) fled abroad to Antwerp and Brussels in the Austrian Netherlands, and from there to towns in French Flanders (in those days still Flemish speaking), like Saint-Omer and Dunkirk, where they were hospitably received by the French government, at the request of Van der Capellen tot den Marsch, who wrote a memorandum (Note: De zaak der verdrukte Hollandsche Patriotten (The plight of the oppressed Dutch Patriots), December 1787.) to King Louis XVI asking for financial support of the refugees. The king provided funding for the financial relief, which was administered by the Frisian Patriots Court Lambertus van Beyma as Commissioner, and Johan Valckenaer, as his secretary. They represented the "democrat" and "aristocrat" wings of the Frisian Patriots, respectively, however, and soon fell out over the disbursements. This led to a schism in the Patriot community in France. The followers of Valckenaer eventually came out on top, as they won the support of the French comptroller-general Charles Claude Guillaume Lambert, who was enraged by Beyma's venality. The two factions, "Valckenisten" and "Beymanisten" split, and formed competing clubs that became embroiled in internal French politics during the French Revolution. Valckenaer became involved in the Batavian Legion that fell afoul of the Jacobins, who distrusted foreigners. But eventually the Dutch Patriots got back in the good graces of the French government after the Thermidorian Reaction and Dutch volunteers formed part of the French army that invaded the Dutch Republic in late 1794. Daendels and Jan Willem de Winter even became générals de brigade.

Other Patriots eventually migrated to the United States, like Mappa, who established a type foundry in New York City, that soon went bankrupt, however. He later became the agent of the Holland Land Company, a vehicle for land speculation founded by Pieter Stadnitski and a number of Amsterdam Patriot financiers in 1789, in Barneveld, New York, where he was joined by François Adriaan van der Kemp, the distributor of Van der Capellen's pamphlet.

The Patriot Revolt, its causes and its denouement in the Prussian intervention were of great interest to the Founding Fathers. This is illustrated by Federalist Paper No. 20, written by James Madison and published under the pseudonym Publius on 11 December 1787 in the context of the debate about the United States Constitution, more particularly about the defects of the Articles of Confederation and similar constitutions. After a description and analysis of the constitution of the Dutch Republic, the paper characterizes it as an example to avoid:

Such is the nature of the celebrated Belgic (Note: In those days it was an often used trope to refer to the Netherlands with the Latin name Foederatae Belgii Provinciae, hence the adjective "Belgic".) confederacy, as delineated on parchment. What are the characters which practice has stamped upon it? Imbecility in the government; discord among the provinces; foreign influence and indignities; a precarious existence in peace, and peculiar calamities from war.

The Paper explicitly refers to the Prussian intervention, but apparently the news of its success had not yet reached the U.S. by the time of the paper's publication, as the wording leaves the hope open that the Patriots will prevail:

The first wish prompted by humanity is, that this severe trial may issue in such a revolution of their government as will establish their union, and render it the parent of tranquillity, freedom and happiness.

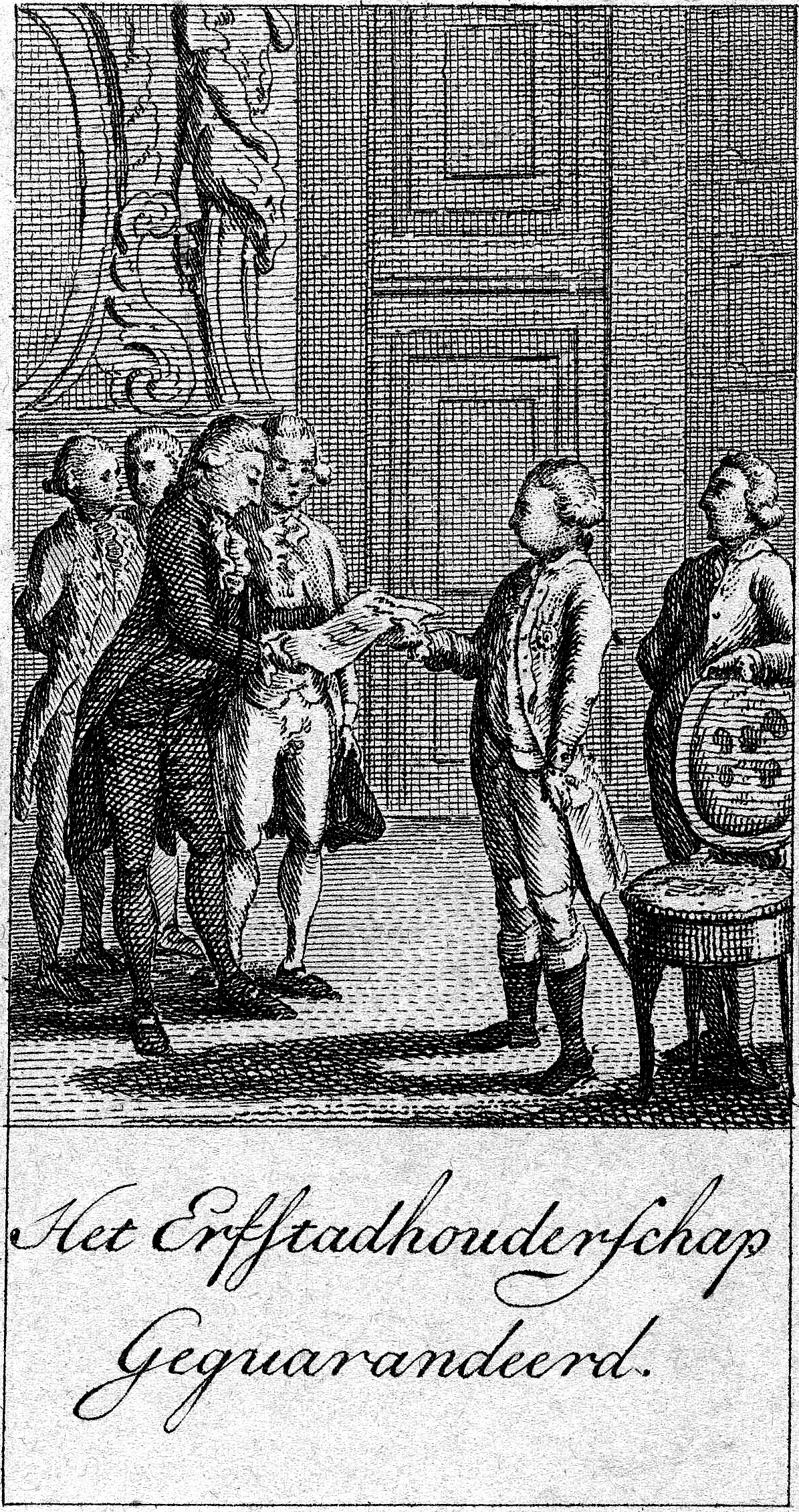
Presentation of the Act of Guarantee by a delegation of the States General to William V on 10 July 1788 at Huis ten Bosch

In the Dutch Republic, meanwhile, Harris worked to ensure that such an outcome would not come about; that there would not be a repeat of the Patriot Revolt; and that the stadtholderian regime would remain on top in perpetuity. (Note: Harris was rewarded for his work in the service of British interests by being created first Baron Malmesbury (of Malmesbury, Wiltshire) on 19 September 1788. His task had not always been agreeable, "...but when one is employed to sweep chimneys one must black one's fingers"; cf. Schama, p. 107, Cobban, p. 111.) To that end he initiated a network of diplomatic treaties that would anchor the regime, beginning with a treaty between Great Britain and the Dutch Republic, signed on 15 April 1788 by Van de Spieghel in London. It guaranteed the stadtholderate to the House of Orange-Nassau in perpetuity and formed a defensive alliance between the two countries. On the same date, at the same hour, a similar treaty was signed between Prussia and the Republic in Berlin. To complete the triangle, Harris brought about a treaty between Great Britain and Prussia during a visit of the Prussian king to his sister at Het Loo on 12/13 June 1788, again guaranteeing the stadtholderian constitution, and renewing the Anglo-Prussian military alliance. This led to the Triple Alliance that was signed on 13 August 1788 between all three countries. Meanwhile, on 10 July 1788 the States General had passed the Act of Guarantee that became a formal part of the Constitution of the Dutch Republic. In this case "perpetuity" only lasted seven years. One of the first actions of the Provisional Representatives of the People of Holland during the Batavian Revolution of 1795, that founded the Batavian Republic, was its repeal and ritual burning on 16 February 1795. The stadtholder had already fled to Kew with his family. He would never return.

== Sources ==
- Adams, J. (1852), The Works of John Adams, Second President of the United States: With a Life of the Author, Notes and Illustrations, Volume 7
- Blaas, P.B.M. (2000). De patriottenbeweging als epiloog: rond Colenbranders "Patriottentijd" in : Geschiedenis en nostalgie: de historiografie van een kleine natie met een groot verleden : verspreide historiografische opstellen (in Dutch). Uitgeverij Verloren. pp. 82–98. ISBN 9065504338.
- Cobban, A. (1954) Ambassadors and secret agents: the diplomacy of the first Earl of Malmesbury at the Hague
- Colenbrander, H.T. (1897). "De patriottentijd: hoofdzakelijk naar buitenlandsche bescheiden". Digitale Bibliotheek voor de Nederlandse Letteren (in Dutch). The Hague.
- Geyl, P. (1950). "De Hollandse Statenpartij. Naar aanleiding van Colenbranders Patriottentijd, in: De Gids, vol. 113". Digitale Bibliotheek voor de Nederlandse Letteren (in Dutch). pp. 30–40.
- Geyl, P. (1947), De patriottenbeweging: 1780-1787 (in Dutch)
- Israel, J.I. (1995), The Dutch Republic: Its Rise, Greatness and Fall, 1477-1806, Oxford University Press,ISBN 0-19-873072-1 hardback, ISBN 0-19-820734-4 paperback
- Jonge, J.C. de, and J.K.J. de Jonge (1861). "Geschiedenis van het Nederlandsche Zeewezen. Deel 4". Google Books (in Dutch).
- Ernst Heinrich Kossmann (2005), De Lage Landen 1780-1980. Twee eeuwen Nederland en België. Deel I: 1780–1914. Amsterdam/Antwerp: Olympus (part of Atlas Contact) (in Dutch)
- Mens, S. (2013), De Patriottentijd. Waarom mislukte de Patriottische opstand? (1781-1787) (thesis) (in Dutch)
- Schama, S. (1977), Patriots and Liberators. Revolution in the Netherlands 1780-1813, New York, Vintage books, ISBN 0-679-72949-6
- Schulte Nordholt, Jan Willem. The Dutch Republic and American Independence, trans. Herbert H. Rowen. Chapel Hill: University of North Carolina Press 1982 ISBN 0807815306
- History of the Eighteenth Century and of the Nineteenth Till the ..., by Friedrich Christoph Schlosser, pp. 373-398
- Pierre de Witt (1886) Une Invasion prussienne en Hollande en 1787. In: Revue des Deux Mondes, 3e période, tome 74, p. 129-164.
