= Constantia van Lynden =

Dutch noblewoman and courtesan

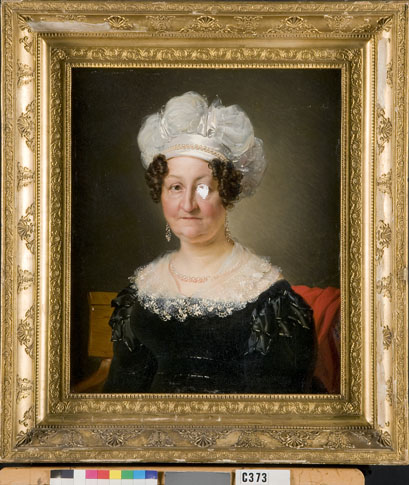
Portrait by Alexandre-Jean Dubois-Drahonet

Constantia van Lynden (1761–1831) was a Dutch noblewoman. She is known as the love interest of William V, Prince of Orange, who courted her in 1779-1782, which caused a scandal and attracted attention in contemporary Netherlands. The affair was used as propaganda by the Patriottentijd for political reasons and she was portrayed as potentially politically influential.
