= Cornelis de Gijselaar =

Dutch politician (1751–1815)

Cornelis de Gijselaar

Cornelis "Kees" de Gijselaar (9 February 1751 – 29 May 1815) was a Dutch politician and patriot, and a leader in the rebellion during the Dutch Republic against the House of Orange.

== Biography ==
Born in Gorinchem, De Gijselaar was educated at the Latin School in Breda and earned a doctorate in Roman and Modern Law from Leiden University in 1774. He was a pensionary (civil servant) in Gorinchem from 26 May 1776 until 1779. From 1779 until 11 October 1787, he was a pensionary of Dordrecht. Together with Adriaan van Zeebergh and Engelbert François van Berckel, pensionaries of Haarlem and Amsterdam, he supported the Dutch Patriots faction, which sought greater autonomy for citizens and less power for the House of Orange during the time of the Dutch Republic. He was a sympathizer with the American Revolution. In the 1780s, he was considered one of the leaders of the faction, and the patriots were nicknamed Kezen after his first name.

Kees had a little dog that followed him everywhere, and with the time became the symbol of this faction, and was known as Keeshond (Kees' dog).

The patriots wore Keeshond pins to signal their allegiance, whereas the Orangists used the orange (tawny) pug as a symbol.

After the Prussian intervention and the restoration of the Oranges in 1787, he lost his leading role and moved to Brussels, where he lived for ten years. He declined offers to become politically active again in 1795 and 1814. He was elected a Foreign Honorary Member of the American Academy of Arts and Sciences in 1809. Cornelis de Gijselaar moved to Leiden after his wife's death, and died there in 1815.
