= Herman Theodoor Colenbrander =

Dutch historian

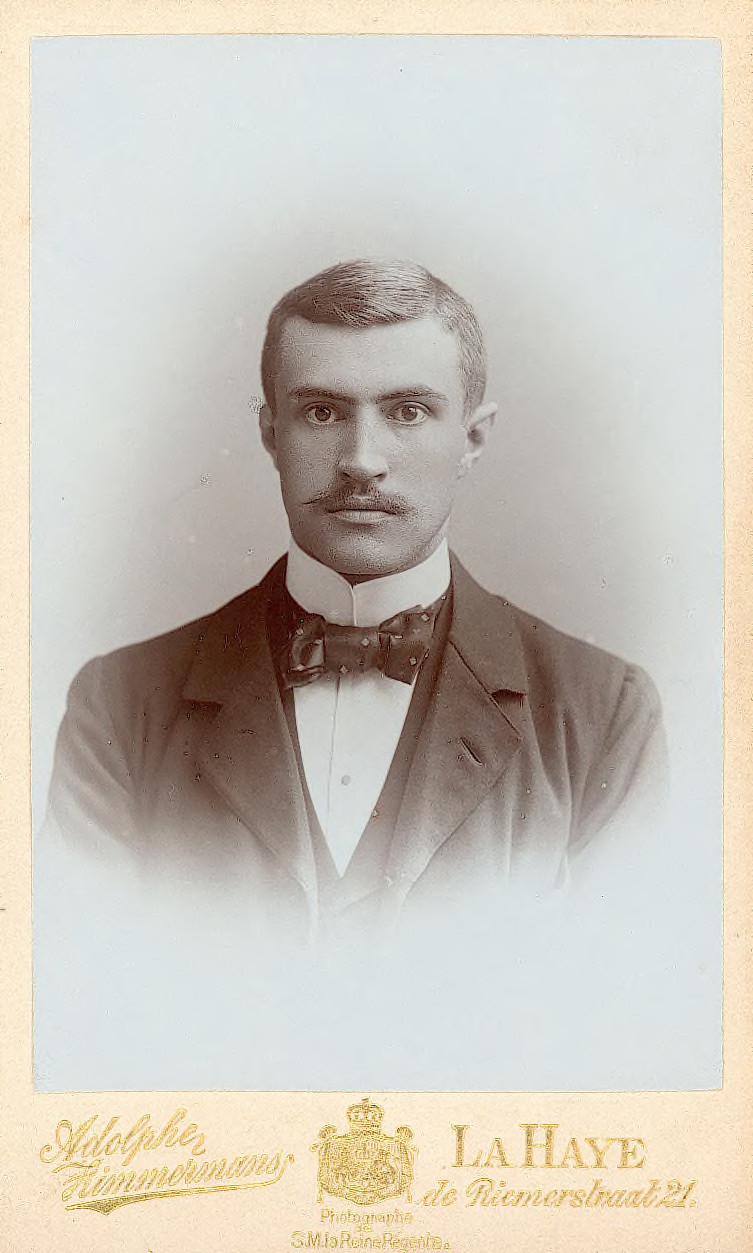
H.T. Colenbrander

Herman Theodoor Colenbrander (13 December 1871 in Drachten – 8 October 1945 in Leiden) was a Dutch historian, the first director of the Commissie van Advies voor 's Rijks Geschiedkundige Publicatiën, which has become the Institute of Dutch History.

In 1908 he became member of the Royal Netherlands Academy of Arts and Sciences.

Between 1918 and 1925 he worked as a History professor at Leiden University, where his subject was "The history of the Dutch East Indies and history of Method in (christian) Mission" (de "geschiedenis van Nederlandsch-Indië en de geschiedenis van de methode der zending"). In 1925 the university promoted him to the Professorship in National History.
