= Joan Derk van der Capellen tot den Pol =

Dutch nobleman

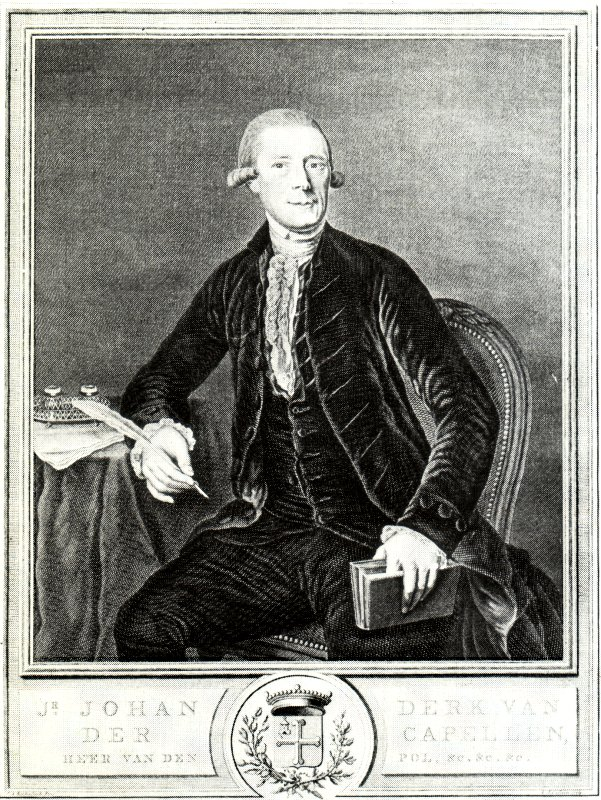
Portrait of Joan van der Capellen tot den Pol

Joan Derk, Baron van der Capellen tot den Pol (Dutch pronunciation: [ˈjoːɑɱ vɑn dər kaːˈpɛlə(n) ˈtɔ dəm ˈpɔl]; 2 November 1741 in Tiel – 6 June 1784 in Zwolle) was a Dutch nobleman who played a prominent role in the revolutionary events that preceded the formation of the Batavian Republic. As a member of the Patriots and inspired by the American Revolution, he wrote the noted pamphlet Aan het Volk van Nederland ("To the People of the Netherlands"), pleading for a more liberal society and the end of the Stadtholder regime, which had been marked by corruption and nepotism. He was also an ardent supporter of the legal recognition of the recently created United States of America.

== Member of the States ==
Van der Capellen became a member of the States of Overijssel in 1772. It was the beginning of his political career. He described himself as a "born regent", but that did not prevent him from being an ardent champion of the Enlightenment ideals and a critic of the Dutch Old Regime.

For that reason, his opponents compared Van der Capellen's public appearance with the style of the English politician John Wilkes. Wilkes criticized the policy of King George III and his ministers, but became very popular. This was partly due to his strategic use of the political press. The press also became a powerful weapon in the hands of Van der Capellen and his patriot friends.

== Abolition of the Drostendiensten ==
As a member of the States Van der Capellen applied himself to the abolition of the so-called "drostendiensten", which compelled the farmers of Overijssel to labour for a pittance a few days every year for the local magistrate, the Drost ("bailiff"). This relic from medieval times was wrongfully applied in his opinion.

In an address to the States in 1778, he pointed out that these rights had been officially abolished in 1631. He ensured his statement was distributed widely and free of charge among the farmers in the Twenthe region. The reverend François Adriaan van der Kemp was his assistant or ghostwriter.

In the end he won his case but his fellow members in the States excluded him from participation in their deliberations until November 1782.

Van der Capellen coat of arms.

== Support for the American Revolution ==
Previously, van der Capellen and other Patriots had greatly disagreed with William V, Prince of Orange and his fellow stadtholders when William proclaimed that he was against expanding the Royal Netherlands Navy, favoring the Dutch States Army as an institution that should be expanded and better funded than the navy instead, and took action to back up his statements on the matter.

In 1776, King George III asked the Dutch Republic whether he could borrow the Scots Brigade and use them in the ongoing American Revolutionary War; van der Capellen voted against sending the regiment to North America. His overt support for the American revolutionaries was not appreciated either. Nevertheless, van der Capellen continued to dedicate himself to supporting the Americans, regarding their struggle as an example for Dutch patriots.

To lend support to his views, he translated the text Observations on Civil Liberty by the Welsh philosopher Richard Price into Dutch. The book was an important inspiration to the American revolutionaries. The translation was banned by the Dutch government in 1789, together with other patriot writings. In 1782, van der Capellen arranged a loan for the American cause. A consortium was set up by Nicolaas van Staphorst and Wilhelm Willink. Eventually an amount of two hundred thousand guilders was raised. Van der Capellen contributed twenty thousand guilders himself.

== To the People of the Netherlands ==
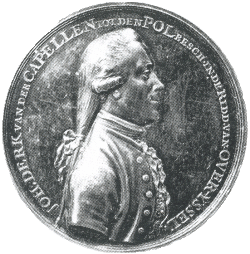
Medal in honor of Joan van der Capellen tot den Pol by Johann Georg Holtzhey in 1783.

The year 1781 was to be the most important in his political career. In that year a pamphlet appeared entitled "Aan het Volk van Nederland" ("To the People of the Netherlands").

In this anonymous pamphlet the disadvantages of the hereditary stadholderate were explained. It should be replaced by a democratic society, based on popular sovereignty. Within a month after publication the pamphlet was banned. Besides, a substantial reward was offered to whoever would report the author. In spite of these measures it was illegally reprinted and distributed three times, and even translated into French, English and German. It was to exert a lasting influence on the democratic movement in the Netherlands.

Van der Capellen, the author of the pamphlet, was forced to enjoy its success in silence, as well as the fact that the authorities failed to identify him as the author. With unflagging zeal he continued to propagate the American cause. Partly thanks to his influence, John Adams and with him the young American Republic were recognized in 1782 by the States General.

Van der Capellen died of intestinal disease in 1784, though his influence and legacy continued to have effects well beyond the grave. A few years later, Orangists blew up his monument in Goor. Van der Capellen's authorship of the pamphlet was revealed 100 years after it had been published.

== Influence ==
The pamphlet is considered the beginning of Dutch democracy.

Politician Pim Fortuyn (1948–2002) was deeply inspired by Van der Capellen. In 1992 Fortuyn wrote his own "To the people of the Netherlands" and declared himself to be the successor of Van der Capellen, as one who had to struggle against the political elite of his time.

In 2015, the so-called Burgerforum-EU published another "To the people of the Netherlands", a pamphlet against the European Union. Dutch politician Thierry Baudet wrote the preface of this booklet.
