= States of Friesland =

Sovereign body in the Dutch Republic

Coat of Arms of the States of Friesland (Note: This was the coat of arms Philip II of Spain as Lord of Friesland had used, but with the royal crown replaced with a crown of a count; Cf. Vries, H. de. "Het Wapen van Friesland". Heraldica civica et militara De Rode Leeuw (in Dutch).)

The States of Friesland were the sovereign body that governed the province of Friesland under the Dutch Republic. They were formed in 1580 after the former Lordship of Frisia (a part of the Habsburg Netherlands) acceded to the Union of Utrecht and became one of the Seven United Netherlands. The Frisian stadtholder was their "First Servant" (mostly in military matters, as he had few other powers before 1748, when the Government Regulations for Friesland were promulgated by then-stadtholder William IV, Prince of Orange). The board of Gedeputeerde Staten (Delegated States) was the executive of the province when the States were not in session (which was most of the time). The States of Friesland were abolished after the Batavian Revolution of 1795 when the Batavian Republic was founded. They were resurrected in name (but not in substance) in the form of the Provincial States of Friesland under the Constitution of the Kingdom of the Netherlands.

== Background ==
After the Lordship of Frisia (formerly enjoying Imperial immediacy in the Holy Roman Empire, but given as a fief to the father of George, Duke of Saxony in 1498 by Maximilian I, Holy Roman Emperor, then still King of the Romans, and sold by duk George to Charles V in 1515), became part of the Habsburg Netherlands, its government followed the general Habsburg model of a stadtholder with a Council (in this case the Court of Friesland). But as in other provinces of the Netherlands a States was periodically convened to send representatives to the States General of the Netherlands to deliberate about the granting of extraordinary subsidies to the central government (called Beden), and as in other provinces the three Estates: Clergy, Nobility, and Third Estate were represented in that body. In Friesland the Third Estate was formed by representatives of the three Goas that made up Friesland: Westergo, Oostergo, and Zevenwouden. These representatives were elected by eigenerfden (comparable to freeholders) who possessed a hornleger (a farmhouse and yard), with a parcel of land attached that was taxed for the verponding or floreen (a land tax that was comparable to the French Taille). The "electoral districts" were formed by the 30 Grietenijen into which Friesland was subdivided. Originally the citizens of the eleven cities were mixed in with the peasants and nobles in the grietenijen, but just before the accession of Friesland to the Union of Utrecht in 1580, they were allowed to form a separate fourth "quarter", apart from the three Goals just mentioned, by then-stadtholder George de Lalaing, Count of Rennenberg, and have their own representation in the States. After the revolutionary period of the accession to the Union in 1579-1580 the Clergy and Nobility no longer participated in the States, at least as separate Estates.

The Gedeputeerde Staten (Delegated States) also predated the Dutch Republic. Already in the 1530s they were formed by the States as a counterweight against the Court of Friesland (then still mainly a kind of Privy council for the stadtholder, and secondarily the court of highest instance in the Lordship). During the first years of the Dutch Revolt they achieved a permanent existence when Rennenberg in 1577 formally recognized them after the Pacification of Ghent. Initially they consisted of two members for each of the "quarters" of Friesland, but in 1584 the quarter of the cites was given three representatives, bringing the total number of members to nine. They formed the true "Executive" on a daily basis and were directly responsible to the States.

== Organisation and powers ==
The States of Friesland were the assembly of the thirty grietenijen and eleven cities (Note: Leeuwarden and Dokkum in Oostergo; Harlingen, Franeker, Bolsward, Sneek, IJlst, Workum, Hindeloopen, and Stavoren in Westergo; and Sloten in Zevenwouden.) of Friesland. Each had one vote in its respective Quarter and each of the four Quarters had one vote in the States of Friesland. (In comparison, the States of Holland and West Friesland were made up of eighteen cities and the ridderschap (College of Nobles) of the County of Holland, each having one vote). Other than most other provinces, Friesland did not have a Ridderschap as part of its States, and the Clergy was also no longer represented as such (though individual nobles and clergymen could of course be delegates). Every grietenij and every city was allowed to send two delegates to the annual session of the States, that was known as the Landdag (Landtag or Diet (assembly)). The grietenijen elected such delegates, called Volmachten (which literally means Proxy) in elections in which owners of a taxable parcel of land of a certain minimum size, with a farmhouse on it (so-called eigenerfden), could take part. The minimum size varied with time. In the Government Regulations adopted in 1748 the minimum size was put at five pondematen (Note: One pondemaat was 0. 3674 hectare, so slightly less than an acre; Cf. Wierdsma, p. 16, note 3.) of clay soil, or ten pondematen of woodland.

The vote was tied to the land and was transferred when the land was sold or otherwise transferred. The minimum size of the taxable parcel so determined the number of votes in the grietenij. The system was open to the abuse of amassing these taxable parcels to amass votes in the grietenij elections. Indeed, vote collectors would buy the plots with borrowed money, giving a mortgage to the lender, and then immediately renting it out to a tenant, who would not be eligible to vote. The hornlegers on this land were rented out in perpetuity for very low rents (sometimes the value of two roosters) and still allow the new owner to use the vote attached to the land (so-called "rooster votes"), but for this reason the Regulation of 1748 stipulated that the new owner should own the house for at least a year, before he could use its vote.

Not everybody who owned such a taxable parcel was allowed to vote, however. Excluded were members of religious denominations that were "not-admitted". The only admitted denominations were the Dutch Reformed Church (and its French-language equivalent, the Walloon church); the Lutheran church, and the Mennonites. Minors could be represented by their guardians. Otherwise, everybody (women, as well as men, natural-born citizens as well as aliens) could exercise the vote.

Passive suffrage was more restricted. In the first place, one of the Volmachten of every grietenij had to be an eigenerfde (i.e. a commoner), while the other had to be a "nobleman." But this immediately posed the problem that Friesland did not have a nobility in the usual sense of families who had received a feudal fief from a liege lord, or people who had been knighted, for lack of a feudal history. However, Friesland did have notable families of great substance, who lived on castles known as Stinsen, and enjoyed the respect of the local population, whose "natural leaders" they were. These people (though not having pieces of paper, such as patents of nobility, to prove their claim) were generally considered members of the domestic nobility, and they often used noble titles like baron or jonkheer. On the other hand, members of foreign (Note: "Foreign" in this case could mean being a citizen of one of the other provinces of the Dutch Republic, as well as of foreign countries.) nobility could be "recognized" as nobles. But all in all, the qualification was vague and gave occasion to much litigation before the Gedeputeerde Staten (who acted as the competent court in disputes about accreditation).

The volmachten representing the cities also were of two kinds: one had to be a member of the city vroedschap; the other a member of the city magistracy, like a burgemeester. These delegates were, however, elected by the combined vroedschap and magistracy, not by each separately. In sum, the Landdag usually consisted of 84 members (60 for the grietenijen and 22 for the cities). But as so much in Friesland this was not strictly enforced, and often the number of delegates was (much) larger, though the number of votes remained fixed at (30 + 11 =) 41.

For all volmachten was required that they be:

- either natural-born citizens of Friesland, or naturalized former aliens, who had resided at least ten years in Friesland;
- at least 20 years of age (though the minimum age, was sometimes put as high as 25);
- an avowed Patriot;
- a member of the Dutch Reformed Church (so this was more restrictive than the requirement for active suffrage, mentioned above);
- finally, there were a number of incompatibilities, like the ineligibility of officers of cities as delegates of the land-quarters, and of officers of the grietenijen and land-quarters as delegates for the cities; and delegates, closely related by blood or marriage, could not be delegates in the same body at the same time

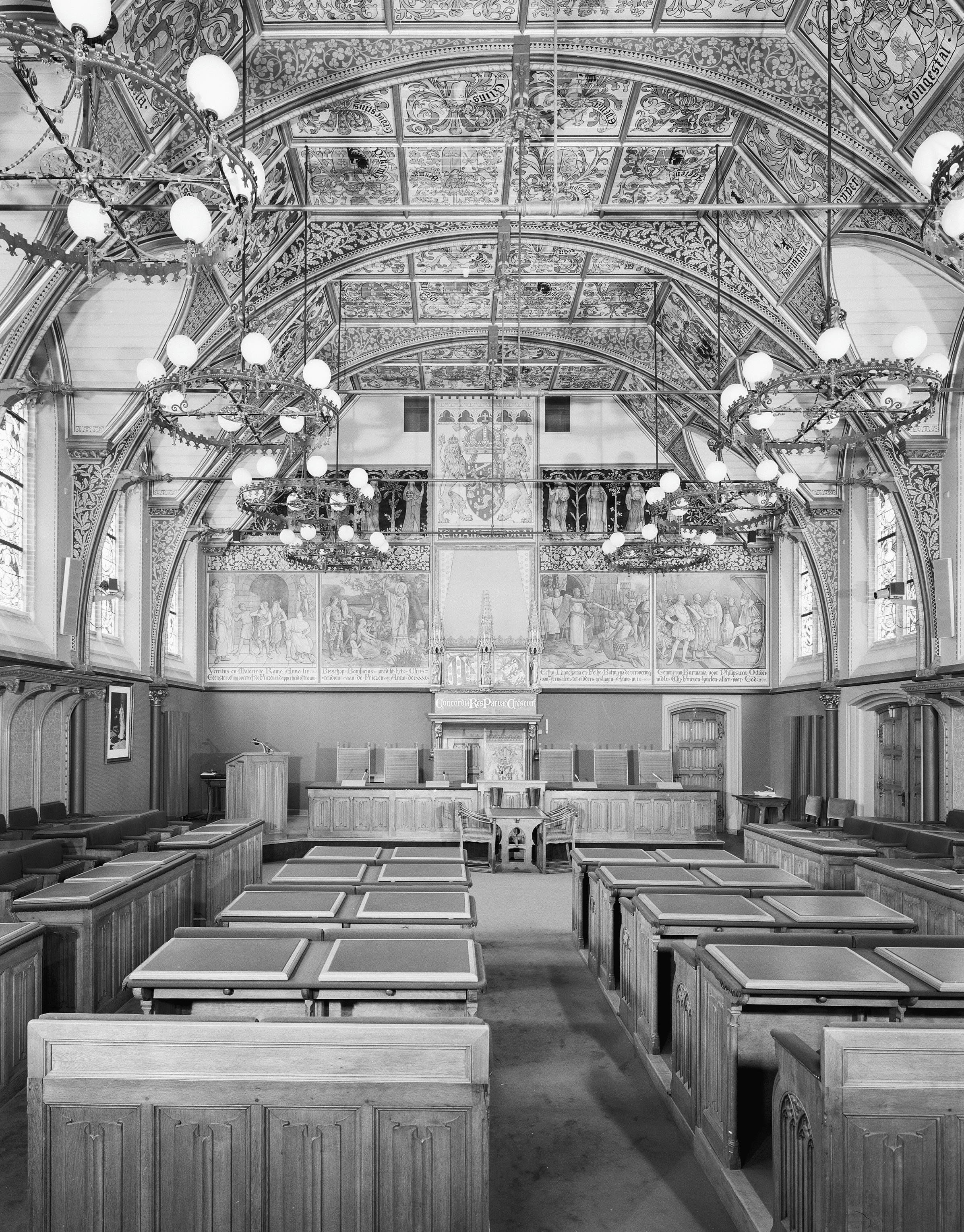
Interior of the restored Meeting Hall of the States of Friesland (still in use by the modern States) (Note: There are Polonceau trusses under the roof.)

The Landdag was usually convened once a year (in January), by a summons issued by the Gedeputeerde Staten to the Grietmannen of the grietenijen and the city governments, who were charged with organizing the elections. The summons usually specified the agenda for the session also, though this would not bind the Landdag. After the elections had taken place the volmachten would convene at the Landshuis in Leeuwarden at the appointed day and time. After the opening of the session they would divide themselves up in four "chambers" (one for each "quarter"), who would start their deliberations in four rooms assigned to these quarters.

The work of the Landdag on a daily basis was organized by a steering committee of eight volmachten (two for each quarter) called the Mindergetal (literally "smaller number" as they were a committee from the States that was smaller than the number of the delegates in the Landdag). Initially this committee was elected by the Landdag at the beginning of the deliberations, but later they were appointed for a number of years, according to a schedule of rotation. All documents for the States (such as petitions) first had to be submitted to the Mindergetal, whose members would convey them to their own Chamber, and report back to the Mindergetal with the advice from the Chamber. The Mindergetal also drafted Resolutions for the Landdag, which were then submitted to the Chambers for deliberation and consent. The Mindergetal also advised the States on documents from the States General and the Council of State.

As elsewhere in the Dutch Republic the "center of gravity" of government was located in local government (i.e. the cities and villages). Sovereignty was supposed to be located "in the People" and to percolate upward from there to the States of the province by way of the local authorities, where it was eventually "reposited". The States were (at least after 1588, when the last of the Governors-General, who before then were considered the founts of sovereignty, Robert Dudley, 1st Earl of Leicester, left Dutch territory forever) considered the governing bodies where sovereignty ultimately resided (Note: And therefore not, as often is incorrectly assumed, in the stadtholders of the several provinces.) But under the Union of Utrecht the seven provinces had concluded a defensive alliance in 1579 and delegated certain sovereign powers upward to the States General of the Netherlands, such as the common defense and foreign policy. For these common matters the provinces had to supply financial contributions and these contributions were with their consent determined in the States General. The States of the provinces were therefore in the first place responsible for the representation of their province in the States General, and for providing the agreed contributions. Legislating about the necessary taxation in each province was therefore an important task of the States (though the collection of those taxes was usually left to the local authorities, who in turn, before 1748, outsourced that task to tax farmers). The States were generally the legislature on the provincial level, though most civil and criminal law already existed under the system known as Roman-Dutch law, that was enforced by the courts with the Court of Friesland at their apex. As the notion of Separation of powers did not (yet) exist, the States were also the Executive on the provincial level.

It is often assumed that the provincial stadtholder (an office held over from the Habsburg Netherlands) was the true "Executive", but this was only the case in any meaningful sense of the word after the Orangist revolution of 1747. Before that, the actual powers of the Frisian stadtholder were very limited by the Instruction the States drafted at the appointment of each of those stadtholders. Ironically, Friesland was the only province that always had a stadtholder, even during the First Stadtholderless Period (1650–1672) and the Second Stadtholderless Period (1702–1747), when other provinces had abolished the office of stadtholder. After 1588 the Frisian stadtholders were always members of the House of Nassau-Dietz, beginning with William Louis, Count of Nassau-Dillenburg. The office was even made hereditary in Friesland for members of this House in 1675. After William the Silent Friesland never had a stadtholder who was a member of the original House of Orange, that expired with William III of England (Note: During William's stadtholderate in the other provinces Henry Casimir II, Prince of Nassau-Dietz was stadtholder in Friesland.) who was never a stadtholder of Friesland. Before 1747 (when the then-Frisian stadtholder, William IV, Prince of Orange, was made stadtholder of all the other provinces also), the competence of the Frisian stadtholder was usually limited in wartime to being Captain-General of the Frisian contingent of troops in the Dutch States Army, usually subordinated to the stadtholder of Holland. In peacetime his duties were even less onerous. All of this changed, however, with the Government Regulations that were promulgated by William IV in 1748 at the express "request" of the Frisian States. After that a large number of powers of appointment that previously had belonged to the States themselves, or the Gedeputeerde Staten, were taken over by the stadtholder. But the States retained the monopoly of creating and abolishing offices for the discharge of tasks on the provincial level, which may be seen as the principal "executive" function of the States.

== History ==
=== Attempts at constitutional reform ===
The "constitution" of Friesland, as in the other provinces of the Republic, was not one written document, but a quilt of medieval charters, ordinances that predated the Union of Utrecht (like the Placard of 30 October 1539, that regulated the elections in Friesland, treaties (like the Peace of Münster), and customs, and legal precedents from Roman-Dutch law. But certain problems with these largely unwritten norms formed an impetus for several attempts at constitutional reform in the form of the promulgation of a written Government Regulation. These problems were widely felt abuses like the trade in votes in the grietenijen and the sale of offices, or in general rampant corruption. The trade in votes led to a situation similar to that of the Rotten and pocket boroughs in the United Kingdom before the Reform Act 1832. The sale of offices was a universal abuse that is known as Simony in the context of the Church, and in many countries elicited periodical attempts at suppression (like e.g. the Sale of Offices Act 1551 in England). But there were other forms of corruption also, that needed to be addressed. Also, the "rules of the game" embedded in the existing system favored certain political players over others, and this led to attempts to arrive at a more equitable set-up. In Friesland these attempts at constitutional reform came to a head during three periods with a "revolutionary flavor": 1627, 1672, and 1748.

In 1627 the proximate cause of the reform movement were new taxes that were introduced in connection with the war situation. (Note: The Eighty Years' War had resumed in 1621 and in 1626-1627 the Spaniards and their allies in the context of the Thirty Years' War approached the Frisian borders. In 1627 Dutch troops under the Frisian stadtholder Ernest Casimir I, Count of Nassau-Dietz captured Oldenzaal. The Spanish successes, however, necessitated an enlargement of the Dutch States Army, first with 7,000 new troops in 1626, and in 1627 to equality with the Spanish Army of Flanders at 58,000 men. This necessitated far larger contributions from Friesland to the financing of the war, and hence to imposition of new taxes by the Frisian States. Cf. Israel, pp. 498-499) As so often, the taxpayers rebelled at this, especially those in the cities, who felt unfairly imposed upon. The oligarchy of the grietmannen was blamed for this, and this led to a movement to diminish their power.

The States appointed a commission of inquiry on 13 December 1626 that had to gather comments from the population about its grievances through the intermediary of the grietmannen and the city governments, and report by 30 January 1627 (i.e. at the time the new Landdag was to be convened). This procedure resulted in a Resolution of the States of 17 April 1627, which became known as the Appeal about Abuses. This formed the basis for the so-called poincten reformatoir (reform points) of 1627, a terminology that was repeated at later occasions.

The most important of these 28 points were the following:

- A Volmacht could no longer be appointed to an Office;
- Votes recruited with corrupt means would be invalid;
- Accumulation of offices was prohibited;
- Written contracts to acquire an office were prohibited, as was the sale of offices;
- Officers could not be absent for periods of more than eight weeks;
- Gedeputeerde Staten were no longer allowed to create paid offices or pensions; this was exclusively a matter for the States;
- There was a quorum for decisions in all official bodies;
- Strict regulations about public accountancy were introduced;
- Strict regulations about the muster of troops were to be enforced;
- In case of vacancies of grietmannen and other grietenij offices, the Gedeputeerde Staten would speedily organize an election in which the voters of the grietenij would draw up a slate of nominees, and the Gedeputeerde Staten would speedily appoint one of these nominees to the vacant office. (Note: Though the office of Grietman was in principle an elective office, the actual election was done, not by the voters, but by a supposedly "neutral" institution that was supposed to be "above the local politics." In this case the appointing institution was not yet the stadtholder (as would be the case after 1748), but the Gedeputeerde Staten. Cf. Wierdsma, p. 54)

These points were promulgated by the Resolution of the States of 15 June 1627.

Unfortunately, these reforms, though impressive on paper, were honored primarily in the breach. They formed the basis for new attempts at reform in 1672 therefore, when a bad war situation again roiled public sentiments. A petition of representatives of the cities of 12 September 1672 to the States referred explicitly to the Appeal about Abuses of 1627. The States had already on 2 March 1672 formed a commission to draw up proposals for military and financial reform, but without result, so the petition may be explained from the frustrations of the population at this inaction. The military situation became threatening for Friesland when on 25 June 1672 the troops of the Prince-Bishopric of Münster, led by Christoph Bernhard von Galen, who had invaded the Dutch Republic from the East, came near to the Frisian border. The danger was soon averted, but the Countess Albertine Agnes of Nassau, Regent (Note: The Frisian stadtholderate was not yet hereditary at this time, but the boy's father had persuaded the States before his death in 1664 to accept him as future stadtholder at his majority in 1675. When William Frederick unexpectedly died in 1664, the mother was treated by the States "as if" she was his regent.) for her son Henry Casimir II, Prince of Nassau-Dietz, the putative stadtholder after the death of her husband William Frederick, Prince of Nassau-Dietz, had already petitioned the States on behalf of her son, to inundate the countryside as a means to stop the enemy. This harebrained scheme was averted, but by then the population was in full revolt.

In Leeuwarden the mob put pressure on the Magistrate to promote the appointment of the only 15-year old Prince as Frisian stadtholder, and this was actually done on 13 July 1672. (Note: Around the same time Prince Henry Casimir's cousin William III was appointed stadtholder in Holland and Zeeland, ending the First Stadtholderless Period.) This did not satisfy the reformers, however, and in September 1672 the Leeuwarden Magistrate was forced to allow the convening of a commission that soon came up with proposals for reform. A petition was handed over to the States and on 18 September 1672 the Landdag appointed a commission to deliberate the 53 points in this petition. Around this time the eminent Frisian jurist Ulrik Huber published a brochure, entitled Spiegel van Doleancie en Reformatie ("Mirror of Appeal and Reform") in which he pleaded for a rational and constitutional/legal approach to reform, instead of the wild "revolutionary" approach of the reformers. He proposed that either the States or the Court of Friesland would take the initiative.

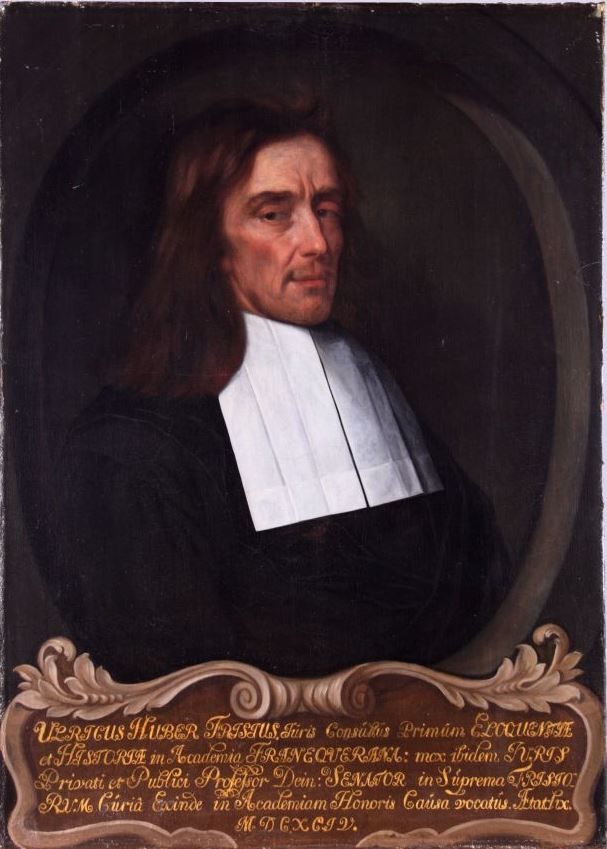
Portrait of Ulrik Huber

His most useful contribution as a legal scholar was, however, that he discussed the poincten reformatoir of 1627 to decide what was still relevant. Among those points he counted:

- the prohibition of the accumulation of offices;
- a minimum age for all offices of 23 years;
- prohibition of corrupt practices at elections (an example was to "liquor up" entire villages at election time);
- prohibition of the sale of offices;
- prohibition of long absences, and the requirement that officers live in the place where they work;
- appointment of representatives of the States in the States General for at least three years.

From this brochure it may be inferred that the abuses were indeed serious. In any case, the commission of the States indeed included many of the points from the 1627 poincts reformatoir recommended by Huber in her proposal, and added a large number of new ones, not always of great import, (Note: One of the proposals was to abolish the office of inspector of stud horses as an economy measure. Cf. Wierdsma, p. 71) but sometimes of great consequence, like the proposed prohibition of grietmannen standing for election as volmacht. This was intended to diminish the power of the grietmannen and would cause great problems when the proposals were adopted under pressure of the Leeuwarden mob by the States in the Resolution of 27 September 1672.

The new Landdag was convened for 14 October 1672, elected under the new Resolution, hence without grietmannen. However, the excluded grietmannen now started a fight over the letters of accreditation of the newly elected volmachten, in which they managed to bring the whole accreditation process to a standstill. The old volmachten, with the support of the new stadtholder and his mother, then convened the States in the city of Sneek for 7 November 1672. The old volmachten defended this schism in the States with the argument that they had been elected for the entire year of 1672, so the recent elections had been illegal, as was the Resolution of 27 September 1672. The two competing Landdagen (in Leeuwarden and Sneek) then published so-called Deducties (Arguments) in pamphlet form in which they pleaded their cases during November and December 1672. The quarrel threatened the safety of the Union, so the States General sent a commission to mediate between the warring Landdagen. That commission arrived on 4 January 1673 in Leeuwarden and offered its services to both the Sneek and Leeuwarden groups. Sneek accepted immediately, but Leeuwarden rejected the offer. The Leeuwarden States preferred mediation by the Court of Friesland. However, this ploy failed and the commission from the States General on 21 January 1673 sent an ultimatum to the Leeuwarden States to accept their mediation. After some hesitation this was accepted on 25 January.

The commission (augmented with the boy-stadtholder) then started with the compilation of a new set of poincten reformatoir with resulted in a draft-Resolution for the States of 105 articles, presented on 8 February 1673 to the States. But this draft did not meet with approval. On 17 February the newly elected Landdag was opened with a speech by one of the commissioners from the States General, but the commission left Leeuwarden on 1 March 1673, without having attained a result. The Gedeputeerde Staten then proposed to the States to put the matter in the hands of a commission of the States, formally chaired by the boy-stadtholder, consisting of one representative of each of the land quarters, and two representatives of the city quarter (one of which was Allart Pieter van Jongestall). This commission took the report of the mediation commission as a starting point and came (after some culling) up with 97 articles, which were promulgated by the Resolution of the States of 19 March 1673.

The new Regulation contained the following important points:

- The stadtholder assumed the rights of his ancestors;
- All disputed decisions of the States of the previous year were annulled;
- The minimum age for a volmacht would be 20 years;
- Grietmannen were eligible for all offices (including volmacht) with exception of member of the Gedeputeerde Staten;
- Aliens could be naturalized after ten years residence;
- Offices could not be transferred to others;
- The offices of Land's Advocate (Grand Pensionary) and fiscal of the Gedeputeerde Staten were abolished;
- An Amnesty was declared in connection with the events of the preceding year.

Furthermore, a large number of articles from the previous poincten reformatoir were included. The whole was called the poincten decisoir of 1673. However, despite this seemingly decisive result the new Regulation was again (like the one of 1627) honored in the breach.

A new political crisis, the one of 1748, was needed to finally arrive at a written constitution that was effective. To understand that crisis the situation during the Second Stadtholderless Period should briefly be recapitulated. After the death of king-stadtholder William III in 1702 the stadtholderate was abolished in all provinces, except Friesland and Groningen, and a regime of Dutch States Party regenten came into power that would stay there until the French invasion of 1747, which caused a popular revolt. During this long period, Friesland retained a stadtholder with the usual limited powers. This was first John William Friso, Prince of Orange, who inherited the office in 1696 (still a minor) and died in 1711. At the time of his death his wife, Landgravine Marie Louise of Hesse-Kassel, was pregnant with their son William IV, Prince of Orange, who was born six weeks later. He also inherited the office of stadtholder in Friesland and Groningen, but evidently was unable to serve, and his mother acted as a regent until his majority in 1731. During this time Gelderland in 1722 also indicated its willingness to accept him as its stadtholder. Between 1731 and 1747 he therefore was already stadtholder in three of the seven provinces of the Republic, but for each separately, and without powers at the national level. In the four other provinces and on the national level the States party dominated, and it also had great influence in the three provinces that had appointed William, which contributed to a steady erosion of his prerogatives in those provinces, according to complaints of his Orangist partisans.

The French invasion of 1747 showed the military unpreparedness of the Republic, as in 1672, and as in 1672 the population revolted against the States party and demanded that a stadtholder be appointed to take charge of the country's defenses. The only likely candidate was William IV, and despite great misgivings the States of Holland and the other three provinces appointed him in their vacant stadtholder's offices in May 1747. He then moved his court from Leeuwarden to the Hague, and started to consolidate his political position by deftly exploiting the disarray of his political opponents and replacing them with his own partisans, often helped by judiciously applied street violence of Orangist mobs to intimidate his opponents. Friesland was spared this violence, apart from a few riots against the tax farmers, which in other parts of the Republic also had drawn the ire of the population. The States asked for military protection against the mob violence from the stadtholder, but like in other cases where he deemed that violence convenient for his purposes, he refused to send troops.

This mob violence was in Friesland, however, canalized into a movement to reform the old regime, starting with a deputation that on 1 June 1748 was sent by the city of Harlingen to the States in Leeuwarden, with a petition, containing the following demands:

- Making the office of Frisian stadtholder hereditary in the House of Orange-Nassau in both the male and female lines, (Note: To avoid misunderstandings, making the office hereditary did not mean that the succession was automatic: the States still appointed the stadtholder, and drew up a new Instruction at each occasion. But there was only one candidate for the position: the current Erfprins of Nassau-Dietz (later Orange-Nassau). Making the office hereditary in both lines did not mean that male descendants did not still have priority, as illustrated by the fact that in 1751 not Princess Carolina succeeded, but her younger brother William V. The provision about the female line was only introduced to avoid a situation as arose in 1890, when Queen Wilhelmina of the Netherlands could not succeed her father William III of the Netherlands as Grand Duke of Luxembourg. The office of Frisian stadtholder had been hereditary in the male line only since 1675.) as had in 1747 been done in the other provinces;
- repeal of a number of taxes, to be replaced with a so-called quotisatie; (Note: This was a form of Poll tax.)
- abolition of the tax farms;
- a request to the stadtholder to draw up written Government Regulations to codify the constitutional arrangements.

These demands were accepted by the hastily assembled States on 5 June, but meanwhile a large number of citizen-delegates from all over Friesland had assembled in Leeuwarden to present further grievances. These so-called gecommitteerden marched to the States and presented a number of demands, partly overlapping with the ones just mentioned, but also that the poincten reformatoir of 1627 and the poincten decisoir of 1672 would be brought into force, and that the authorities would indicate their willingness to accede to future petitions, or would allow the populace to approach the stadtholder with their grievances. (Note: The States had on 11 June 1748 requested the stadtholder to come up with a draft for new poincten reformatoir; Cf. Wierdsma, pp. 96, 117) Even more consequential than these demands (that were immediately granted) was that the gecommitteerden charged a number of commissions from their midst to formulate new proposals. This led to a number of further reforms in the following months, such as the new rule that the stadtholder would have a tie-breaking vote in the Landdag.

On 5 July 1748 the gecommitteerden went to the States in solemn procession, and presented a further list of 72 demands, and another list of 47 demands on 25 July. These lists contained (in random order) the usual forms of redress of grievances against the combination of offices; forms of official corruption, like sale of offices; appointment of minors in offices as sinecures; election abuses; the abolition of the regulation of stud horses (which appears to have been an enduring grievance); accountability in the public finances, including the mustering of the troops; reduction of the standing army in peacetime; increase of the minimum size of the parcel of land attached to a vote, to ten pondematen clay soil and twenty pondematen woodland, but only for new cases; the prohibition of payments by the authorities in the form of paper money or IOUs; incompatibilities of all kinds of public offices, especially for grietmannen; abolition of a number of privileges; and many others of more or less importance. Most of these demands were accepted by the States, but with the proviso that these decisions would be approved by the stadtholder. The gecommitteerden saw this as too much wiggle room, and demanded that the reforms would be guaranteed by the stadtholder, which the States hastily consented to.

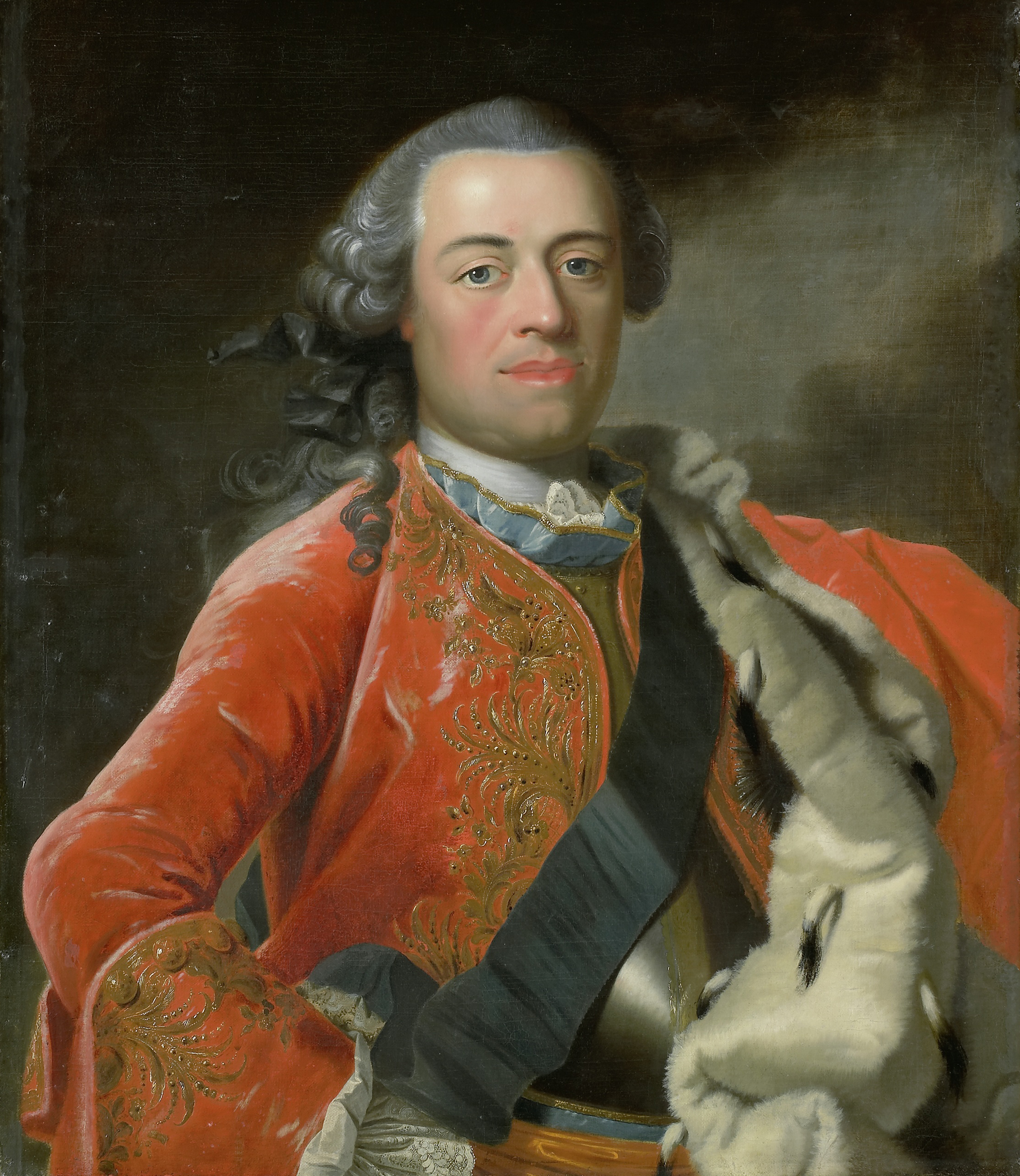
Portrait of stadtholder William IV

These reforms seemed a great success for the "democratic" forces in Friesland, and a defeat for the old oligarchy. But then the stadtholder intervened. He had already restored the Regeringsreglementen (Government Regulations) that the States of Gelderland, of Overijssel and of Utrecht had been forced to accept in 1674 as the price of their re-admission to the Union after their occupation by the French army in 1672, and which had given then-stadtholder William III far-reaching powers of control over their provincial governments. These Regulations had lapsed under the stadtholderless regime, but were now re-introduced for the benefit of William IV. They gave him the right of appointment, or at least approval of appointments, of magistrates on the local level (from a slate of nominees, drawn up by the local vroedschap, but he was not bound by those nominations), and of officials on the provincial level, among whom delegates to the States General. William also tamped down on "democratic" movements among his followers in other parts of the country.

In August 1748 he did send troops "to restore order" (though the disturbances had ceased by then) and delegated a commission of the States General to hold an inquiry into the causes of the unrest in Friesland. (Note: This was quite a constitutional reversal: in olden days the States General had sent stadtholders on such a mission, not the other way around.) This commission consisted of a number of his henchmen from other provinces: Schimmelpenninck van der Oye (delegate for Gelderland), Gevaerts (Holland), Verelst (Zeeland), Perzoon (Overijssel). They arrived in Leeuwarden at the end of August and immediately started hearings of a number of people specifically selected by William himself (mostly grietmannen from well-known noble families) to inform them about what had been going on. It should not cause much surprise that the first conclusion the Commission arrived at after its inquiry was that the main cause of the disturbances had been "the little authority, left to the stadtholder, because of which the authority of the States had become overweening"

Little happened after the departure of the Commission at the end of September, however, as everybody seemed to be awaiting the arrival of the stadtholder himself, which was delayed until December 1748. On 21 December 1748 he gave a forceful speech to the Landdag and handed over his already completed Reglement reformatoir, a Government Regulation for Friesland after the model of the Regulations for the other provinces mentioned before. (Note: This was a novum for Friesland, as it had never had such a Government Regulation imposed.) After referring to the request of the States of 11 June 1748, the stadtholder enumerated 60 articles, among which were the following:

- The minimum size of a vote-carrying parcel of land would again be 5 pondematen of clay soil, or 10 pondematen of woodland (i.e. half the size the gecommitteerden had laid down in July), and a number of other regulations concerning elections;
- The stadtholder (no longer the Gedeputeerde Staten) appoints the Grietman from the slate of nominees drawn up in the grietenij elections;
- An ordinary session of the States could last no longer than six weeks, and a number of other regulations concerning the rules of order of the deliberations of the States; extraordinary sessions could only consider the agenda made up by the Gedeputeerde Staten;
- In case of conflicts between chambers of the Landdag the stadtholder decides, and also in conflicts of an administrative or political nature, where the Court of Friesland will no longer be competent;
- As the tax farms have been abolished, which causes a crisis in the public finances, the States will decide on new taxes to replace these revenues, and a number of reforms of public accountancy and of the collection of taxes were ordained;
- The old guilds were to be restored in the cities with regulations updated to modern circumstances;
- Only officially established weigh houses were to be tolerated;
- All old laws not contrary to this Regulation will remain in force;
- All officials will swear an oath to maintain this Regulation;
- The stadtholder is the only person who may interpret and explain this Regulation (but he was not authorized to amend. it on his own in future)

William left Leeuwarden for The Hague at the end of 1748 in the belief that he had finally laid down a written constitution for Friesland that would actually be observed. However, this appears not to have been the case, as shown by the facts in the Apologie ("Apologia") of Frisian politician Court Lambertus van Beyma, published during his exile in Saint-Omer in 1790. Many corrupt practices were continued, and the hoped for forceful government of William IV as a benevolent dictator in the Republic did not materialize. After his unexpected death in 1751 his infant son William V, Prince of Orange formally succeeded him as stadtholder in all provinces of the Republic, but the government was exercised as Regent by his mother Anne, Princess Royal and Princess of Orange until her death in 1759. During this time a so-called "Frisian cabal" of her courtiers made the stadtholderian regime infamous for its corrupt practices. One especially corrupt official was her equerry Douwe Sirtema van Grovestins, who once sold the governorship of Dutch Ceylon for 70,000 guilders. When William V came of age in 1766 and was duly appointed stadtholder in all provinces, he remained under the tutelage of his equally corrupt mentor Duke Louis Ernest of Brunswick-Lüneburg, with whom he concluded the Acte van Consulentschap. (Note: The Frisian States tried to claw back some of their independence at the occasion of their appointment of William as the Frisian stadtholder in 1766, when they formulated a restrictive Instruction. But the Duke of Brunswick easily deflected this attempt at insubordination. Cf. Israel, p. 1092) This regime eventually provoked the Patriot Revolt during the Patriottentijd.

=== The schism during the Patriottentijd ===
The system of suffrage for the States facilitated the accumulation of votes in a few hands of people who bought up land parcels to which votes were attached. To finance these land purchases they generally took out mortgage loans. In any case, around the 1770s the main investors in these mortgage loans were wealthy members of the Mennonite religious minority, who were discriminated against in public life. Though they could vote in elections, they were not allowed to stand for those elections, which formally deprived them of political influence. But materially they did use their hold over the mortgagors to strongly influence the elections. They were strongly opposed to the stadtholderate that they saw as the main obstacle to their own emancipation. Through their influence the States had a large minority of Patriot members, and at times even a majority.

One example of this Patriot hold over the States was seen in February 1782 when the States accepted the letters of accreditation of the envoy of the "Rebel" United States of America, John Adams, as the first province in the Union (and the second sovereign body in Europe, after the Kingdom of France), and instructed their delegates in the States General to do likewise. This helped convince the latter body to recognise the United States on 19 April 1782, against the will of the stadtholder, which represented an important diplomatic coup for Adams.

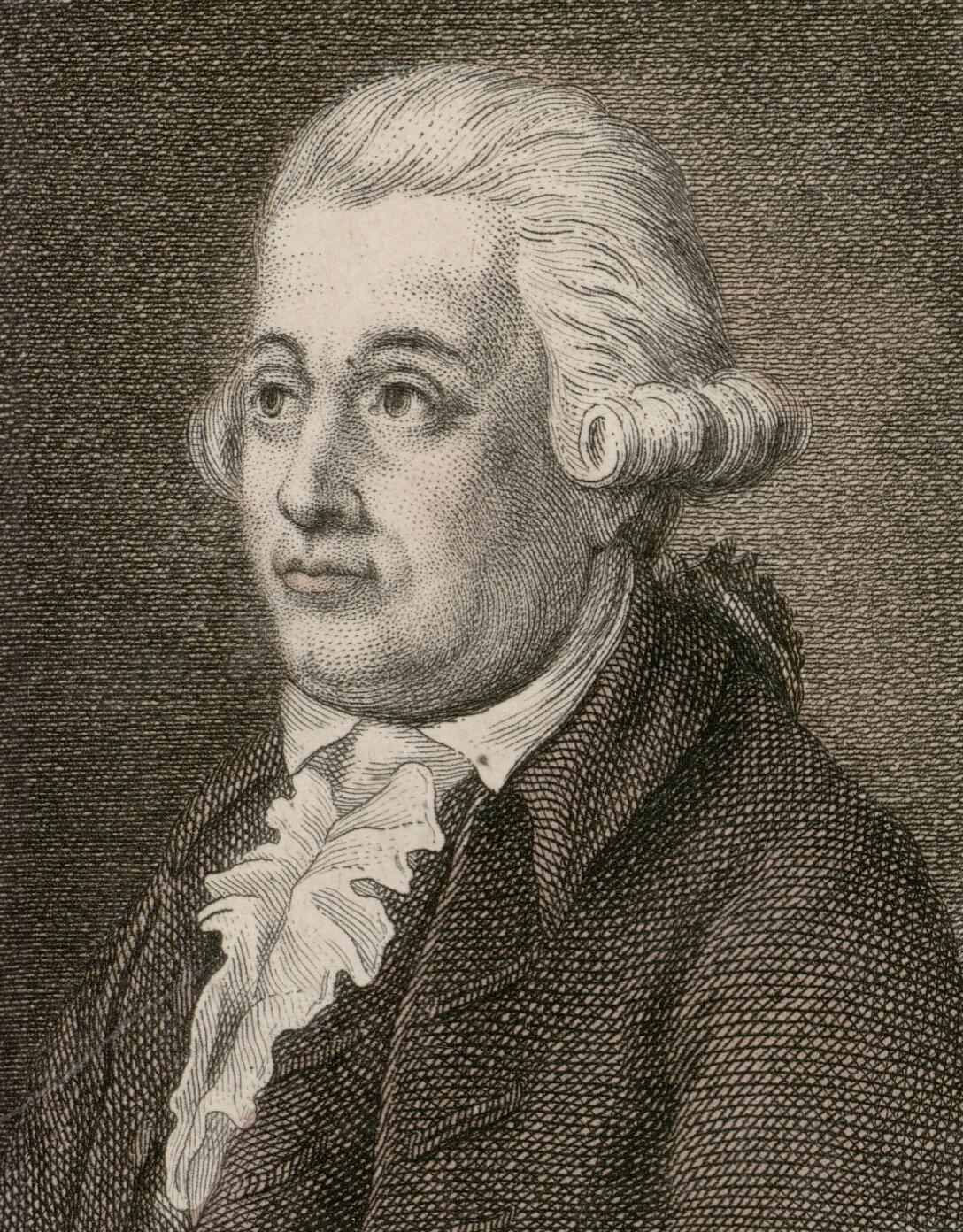
Portrait of Court Lambertus van Beyma

But usually the Patriots and the Orangists in the States were more or less in balance and around 1787 the Orangists had a definite majority, though this was uncertain enough that the British ambassador in the Republic, Sir James Harris, who had by then a mandate from the government of William Pitt the Younger to subvert the Patriots, and had the use of a slush-fund of £70,000 to further that end, embarked on a scheme to buy up enough mortgages of Pro-Orangist voters in Friesland, to break the hold of the Mennonites, and secure a definite Orangist majority in the States.

However, the elections of January 1787 had already resulted in an Orangist majority in the States, which was immediately used to legislate against the Patriots: Patriot petitions were prohibited as were Patriot demonstrations. But the Patriots did not take this attempt at suppression lying down. Van Beyma mobilized the Patriot civic militias that helped protect the centers of Patriot opposition against the States against repression by the States Army garrison in Leeuwarden. One of those centers was the University of Franeker where the faculty and students were strong Patriot partisans. The faculty member Johan Valckenaer was dismissed by the States for his political views in May 1787, which caused the students to riot. This recommended Franeker as a safe place for Patriots. When a split developed in the States of Utrecht in the Summer of 1787, with rival States, one from Amersfoort, the other from Utrecht city, vied for recognition as the "true" representatives of that province in the States General, van Beyma tried to do the same in Friesland.

About twelve Patriot volmachten went to Franeker to constitute themselves as the "Franeker" States in opposition to the rest of the volmachten who remained in Leeuwarden. Valckenaer opposed this, because he thought that militarily Harlingen, where the arsenal of the Admiralty of Friesland was located, was a better choice. The opportunity passed, however, when the Leeuwarden States had Harlingen occupied by States Army troops on 4 September 1787. Meanwhile, Franeker had been reinforced with Patriot militia from Holland, and the city prepared for a siege. While the Leeuwarden States recalled States Army troops, paid for by Friesland, to the province, both sides started anathematizing each other, both claiming to be the "true and only legitimate" States of Friesland.

Before the civil war could begin in earnest, however, the Prussian invasion of Holland started on 13 September 1787, and soon the resistance of the Frisian Patriots collapsed. Those that could get away, fled to Amsterdam, led by van Beyma and Valckenaer, to take part in the last stand of the Patriots. After the fall of that city on 10 October 1787 most of the Frisian Patriots fled to France, where most congregated in Saint-Omer in the next few years, often feuding among themselves.

But they returned "with a vengeance" in 1795 when the old Republic was overturned by the Batavian Revolution. On 7 February 1795 a Committé Révolutionair Provinciaal met for the first time. This took over the powers of the Frisian States. Soon, after the example of the Provisional Representatives of the People of Holland a similar assembly of Provisional Representatives of the People of Friesland formally took over from the States on 19 February 1795. This was replaced by the National Assembly of the Batavian Republic in April 1796.

== See also ==
- States of Holland and West Friesland

== Sources ==
- Cobban, A. (1954). Ambassadors and secret agents: the diplomacy of the first Earl of Malmesbury at the Hague.
- Colenbrander, H.T. (1899). "De patriottentijd. Deel 3: 1786-1787". Digitale Bibliotheek der Nederlandse Letteren (in Dutch).
- Geyl, P. (1947). De patriottenbeweging: 1780-1787 (in Dutch).
- "Gewestelijke bestuursinstellingen van Friesland 1580-1795". Archieven.nl (in Dutch).
- Huber, U. (1672). "Spiegel Van Doleancie En Reformatie, Na den tegenwoordigen toestant des Vaderlandts". Google Books (in Dutch).
- Israel, J.I. (1995). The Dutch Republic: Its Rise, Greatness and Fall, 1477-1806. Oxford University Press. ISBN 0-19-873072-1.
- Wierdsma Schik, P. (1857). "Akademisch proefschrift over de staatsregtelijke geschiedenis der Staten van Friesland van 1581 tot 1795". Google Books (in Dutch). W. Eekhoff.
