= Pieter 't Hoen =

Dutch journalist, poet and politician

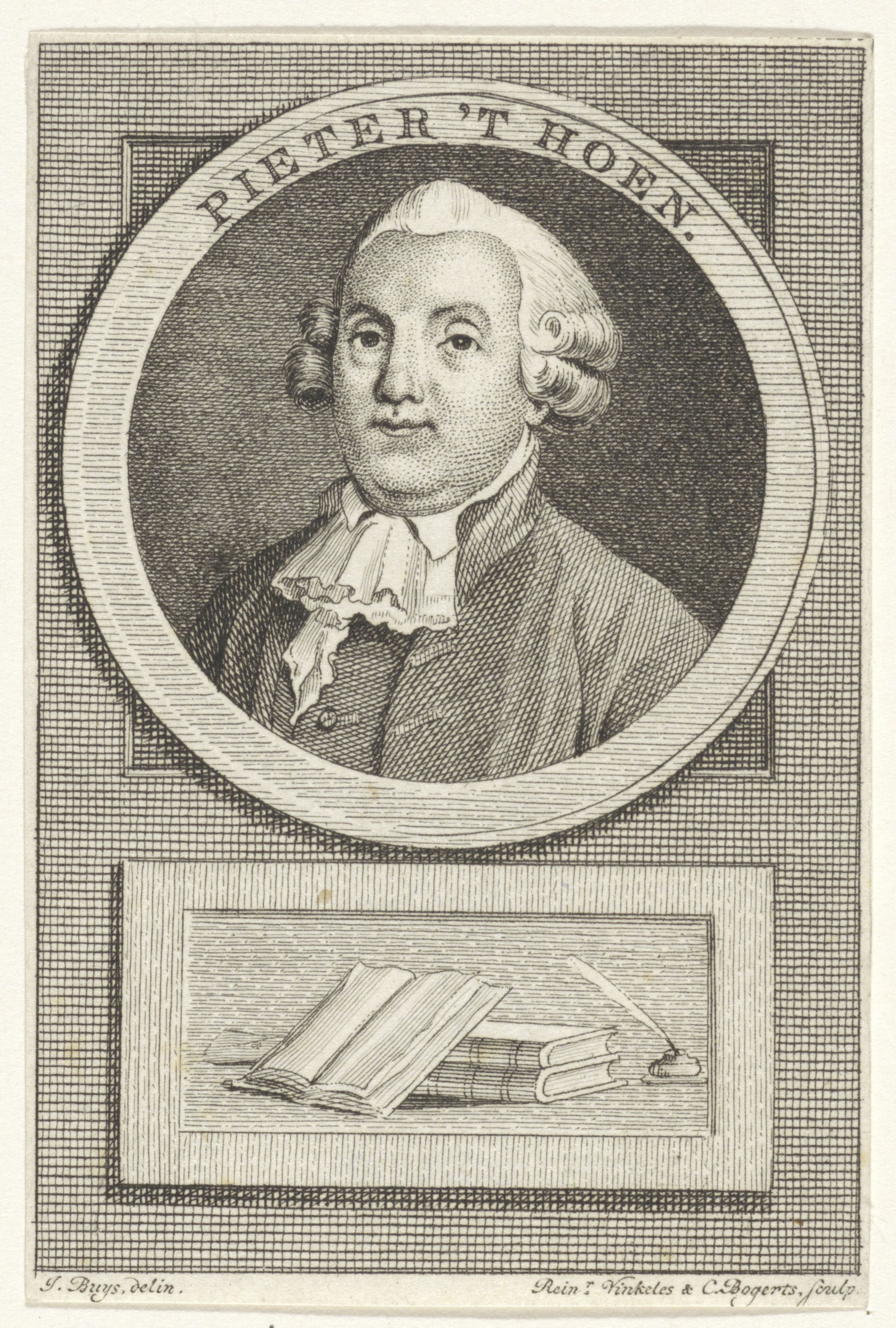
Portrait of the Dutch Patriot journalist, poet and politician Pieter 't Hoen (1744-1828) by Reinier Vinkeles

Pieter 't Hoen (baptized 18 October 1744 in Utrecht – 9 January 1828 in Amersfoort) was a Dutch journalist, poet, and politician who played an important role during the Patriottentijd as the editor of De Post van den Neder-Rhijn.

== Personal life ==
't Hoen was the son of the Utrecht grocer and cheese merchant Reinier 't Hoen, and Johanna Masman. He started his studies at the elite Hiëronymusschool (a Latin school in Utrecht) in 1755, but was so unruly that his father had him put in a borstal, called De Vurige Kolom (The Fiery Column) for a year on 29 December 1761, but he was allowed to leave after less than a year in November 1762. Soon hereafter, in April 1763, he married the then 17-year-old Annemietje Nihof, daughter of a Leiden textile merchant. They would remain married for almost 63 years, and have four sons and four daughters between 1764 and 1781. The couple moved in with his parents at the Neude in Utrecht, and he probably worked in his father's business until 1777

== Career ==
To compensate for his spoiled scholastic career 't Hoen indulged in self-study in his spare time and tried to gain entry to the literary circles of his time, which was difficult for someone without scholastic credentials. He therefore made an attempt to draw the attention of the Leiden poet Johannes le Francq van Berkheij by writing an Ode dedicated to this person in October 1774. The poet indeed took him under his wings and introduced him in polite society. Together with twelve other amateurs, 't Hoen started the Utrecht society for poetry Volmaakter door den tijd (More perfect through time). In the next few years, he became a successful writer of poetry (especially verse for children (Note: 't Hoen is seen by literary critics as an epigone of Hieronymus van Alphen, and not a very good one;Cf. Ros, pp. 1-3)) and plays. As he received a sinecure in the form of the stewardship of the Collegium Willebrordi, a boarding school associated with the Hiëronymusschool, in March 1777, he had more time to dedicate himself to his literary work. (Note: One of the perks of the job was the use of an apartment in the building of the College.) The office also gave him an entry in the world of the Utrecht regenten and Utrecht politics.

Between 1778 and 1780 he wrote a number of moralizing and political essays under the pseudonym J.A. Schasz, M.D. (Note: According to Theeuwen this pseudonym would later be appropriated by the Patriot journalist Gerrit Paape. However, Ros claims that the pseudonym was always Paape's and the early plays with the pseudonym were also written by Paape. Cf. Ros, p. 2) He also wrote four political comedies, inspired by the American Revolution and the American Revolutionary War, with an anti-British tenor, under this pseudonym. These plays were popular under the pro-American citizenry of the Dutch Republic at this time. Those sympathies were not shared by the regime of stadtholder William V, Prince of Orange who was related to the British king George III of the United Kingdom (Note: He was a grandson of king George II of Great Britain, just like George III himself, through his mother, Anne, Princess Royal and Princess of Orange.) and therefore preferred a pro-British and anti-American/French policy. Despite this official policy of the Republic, Great Britain was so displeased with a number of pro-American Dutch policies that it declared war on the Republic in December 1780. This war did not go well for the Dutch, and the population blamed the stadtholder. 't Hoen, sharing this feeling, started a publication, entitled De Post van den Neder-Rhijn, on 20 January 1781, which in the following six years would become a thorn in the side of the stadtholder's regime. (Note: One of the scoops of De Post was the publication of the secret Acte van Consulentschap in 1784)

De Post was published by the printer's firm G.T. van Paddenburg & Zoon in Utrecht (who used his own name). Most of the contributors to the journal (that was published weekly in a format of 8 Octavo pages, and cost 1 1/2 stuiver) used pseudonyms, however, because of the risk of prosecution for "sedition". The weekly soon enjoyed a wide circulation (2400 copies per issue) in the entire Netherlands, probably because of its moderate and reasoned presentation of radical points of view. (Note: It was less of a scandal sheet than its competition, such as the Politieke Kruyer from Amsterdam.) It became one of the leading Patriot journals in Utrecht, with great political influence.

In November 1782 't Hoen became a member of the Patriot club Getrouw voor het Vaderland (Loyal to the Fatherland), a leading Utrecht political society, together with Pro Patria et Libertate in which the other Patriot leader in Utrecht Quint Ondaatje was an officer. He also in November 1785 took up a commission as a lieutenant in the Utrecht schutterij in the Turkije company. As such he got engaged in the exercitiegenootschap-movement that was important in Patriot politics. De Post published a large number of articles about this movement in this period. It became one of the major organs of Patriot propaganda in this way.

Both as journalist and political activist 't Hoen became involved in the democratization process of the Utrecht city and provincial government in 1784–1785, which led to the first democratically-elected city government in the Dutch Republic in August 1786. The adherents of the stadtholder, the Orangists formed a rival States of Utrecht in December 1785 that moved to Amersfoort under the protection of a garrison of Dutch States Army troops that repeatedly threatened Utrecht. On 9 May 1787 't Hoen, with his company of schutters took part in the Battle of Jutphaas to repel one of those threatening moves. This success was, however, soon followed by the Prussian invasion of Holland, during which Utrecht was given up to the Prussians without a fight. 't Hoen followed the Patriot troops in their retreat to Amsterdam in September 1787. After the fall of Amsterdam on 10 October, 't Hoen fled like many other Patriots to first Brussels, and later French Flanders with his family. In 1789 he was sentenced in absentia to 25 years banishment.

In France he received a pension of 2,400 livres from the French government in recognition of his work as a journalist, who had often been supportive of French policies. He lived for short periods of time in Saint-Omer, Gravelines, Dunkirk, and eventually Watten near St. Omer, where he joined a "commune" of other Dutch Patriots, like his colleagues Wybo Fijnje and Gerrit Paape. In this period he remained active as a journalist. He started a new publication, entitled Gedenkschriften van Martinus Scriblerus den Jongen (Memoirs of Martinus Scriblerus the Younger) that had an anti-clerical character. He also cooperated with the journalist Joost Vrijdag in editing the periodical Duinkerksche historische courant (Dunkirk historical journal), but this went bankrupt, according to Vrijdag because of 't Hoen's financial incompetence. When the new French government ended his pension in 1793 't Hoen started a tobacco factory, and sold his real estate in Utrecht. He was sufficiently successful as a writer that he could live from his writings. In 1793 he published Kort historisch verhaal en onzydige aanmerkingen over de gesteltenis van Braband (Short historical narrative and neutral remarks about the situation of Braband) by Jan Frans Vonck.

Meanwhile, 't Hoen became embroiled in the internal strife of the exiled Patriots between the followers of Johan Valckenaer and Court Lambertus van Beyma on the side of Valckenaer. Together with the latter and several other Dutchmen he became active in French revolutionary politics as a member of the Jacobin party in Watten, though he kept apart from the turmoil of the Reign of Terror of Maximilien Robespierre c.s. He followed the French army that in November 1794 and early 1795 overran the Dutch Republic, and helped found the Batavian Republic as the secretary of the Provisional Representatives of the People of Utrecht (the Utrecht equivalent of the Provisional Representatives of the People of Holland) in February 1795. This was made permanent when on 17 March 1795 he was made secretary of the Finance Committee. On 18 April 1796 he was appointed secretary of the new provincial government of Utrecht. Meanwhile, he also founded a new journal, De Nieuwe Post van den Neder-Rhijn. This weekly would have 260 issues with a circulation of 1,400 copies between 10 March 1795 and 6 December 1799.

In this new journal he published a draft for a new constitution for the Batavian Republic that had a decided '"unitarist" slant in that it proposed the abolition of the federal structure of the Republic. This was an important issue in those days. The strife between the "federalists" and "unitarists" would in January 1798 issue into a coup d'etat that brought the '"unitarists" in power. 't Hoen supported this overturn of the political order, and he was as a result confirmed in his post as secretary of the new regional government that in 1799 replaced the old provinces of Utrecht and Gelderland with a department that encompassed both. In this same period 't Hoen promoted religious emancipation of dissenters and Roman Catholics, who under the old Republic had been discriminated against in favor of members of the Dutch Reformed Church in De Nieuwe Post.

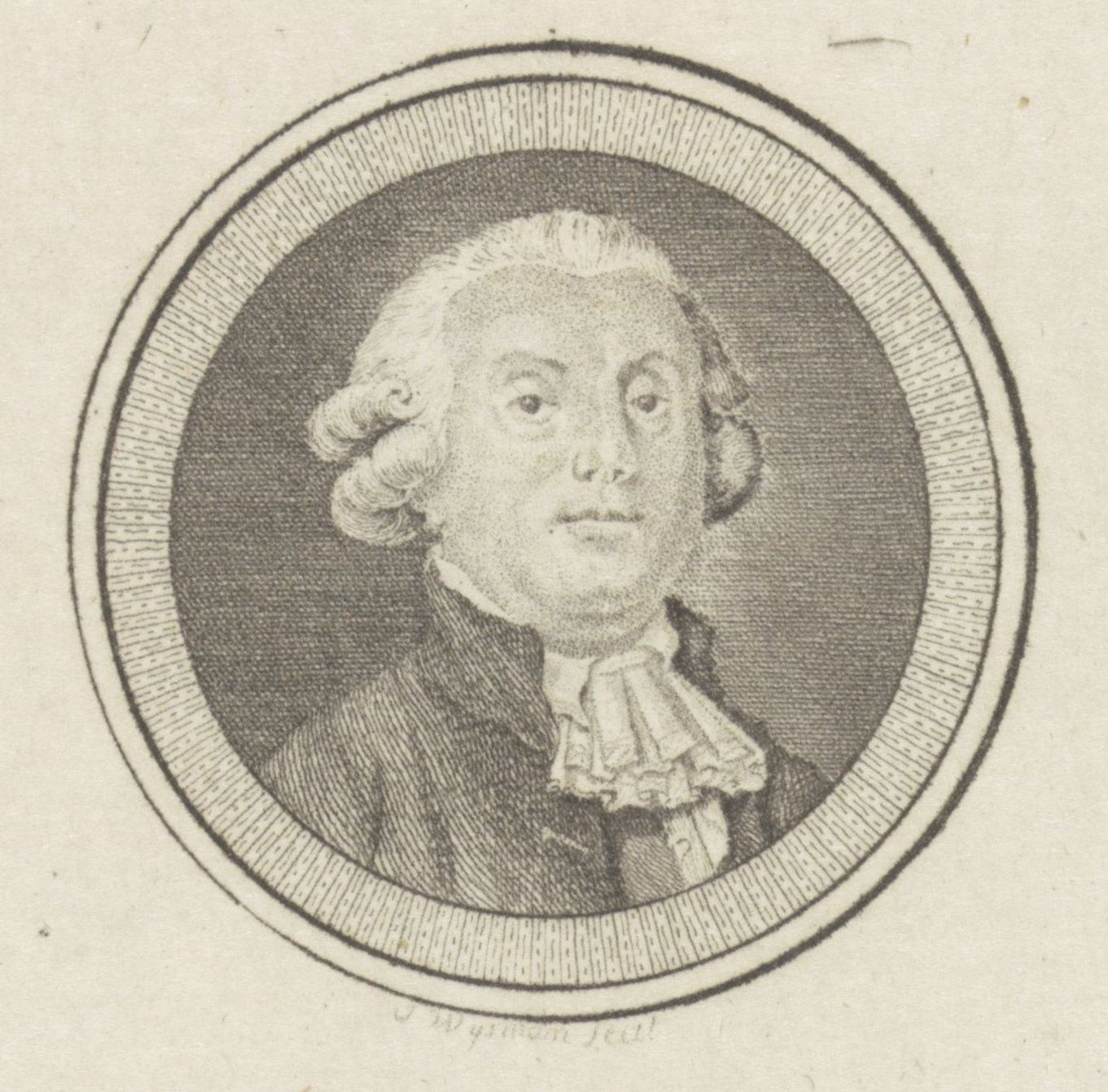

In the Summer of 1799 't Hoen, as secretary of the departmental government, got very busy with defensive measures against a threatening invasion by Orangist Émigrés from Germany, in support of the Anglo-Russian invasion of Holland. For that reason he was forced to neglect his work for De Nieuwe Post and this caused the cessation of its publication in December 1799.

The coup d'etat of October 1801 brought a far more conservative regime in the Batavian Republic to power, which attracted many former Orangists. 't Hoen lost his post as secretary and was demoted to Commies (clerk), with a large diminution of salary in 1802. 't Hoen lost his political influence and returned to private life. He started writing plays again, but ceased his literary work in 1806.

In 1811 (after the annexation of the Netherlands by the First French Empire) 't Hoen managed to obtain a post as clerk of the court in Amersfoort. He and his wife lived in a comfortable home in this city until their deaths (his wife died in 1826). His last years were difficult because of financial troubles, and because six of his children predeceased him. He himself died on 9 January 1828, 83 years old.

== Works ==
- Het Boeren Gezelschap of de Gehekelde Hekelaars (play, 1775)
- Nieuwe proeve van klijne gedichten voor kinderen (children's poems, 1778–1779)
- Jurjen Lankbein. Of de Mof commis (farce, 1778)
- Het Engelsche en Amerikaansche kaart-spel (political comedy, 1778)
- De verdrukte wildeman (political comedy, 1778)
- De misrekening (political comedy, 1778)
- De Geplaagde Hollander (political comedy, 1778)
- Het Verdrag ( political comedy, 1778)
- (As "Taco Brans"), Catechismus der natuur, ten gebruike van kinderen (children's book, 1779)
- Holdwich. Of de Mof, commis door bedrog (farce, 1779)
- Ter glorierijke nagedachtenis van Van Bentinck (essay, 1781)
- Nieuwe spectatoriaalse schouwburg, behelzende oorspronkelijke toneelstukken ter verbetering der Nederduitsche zeden (plays, 2 vols., 1782–1789)
- De Vlugtende Wysgeer (letters, c. 1790)
- Vaderlandsche schouwburg, bevattende oorspronglijke toneelstukken (plays, 3 vols., 1790–1793)
- Godefroy de Dwingeland of de Redder van zijn vaderland (play, 1793)
- Het verjaaringsfeest, of de te Amiens geslooten vreede (play, 1803)
- Mars in de boeyen of het herstel van den vreede (play, 1803)
- Fabelen en kleine gedichten voor kinderen (children's poems, 1803))

== Sources ==
- Aa, A.J. van der (1867). "Pieter 't Hoen, in: Biographisch woordenboek der Nederlanden. Deel 8. Tweede stuk". Digitale Bibliotheek voor de Nederlandse Letteren (in Dutch). p. 866.
- Laan, K. ter (1952). "Pieter 't Hoen, in: Letterkundig woordenboek voor Noord en Zuid". Digitale Bibliotheek voor de Nederlandse letteren (in Dutch).
- Ros, B. (2014). "P 't Hoen in: J. van Collie, W. van der Pennen, J. Staal, and H. Tromp (eds), Lexicon van de jeugdliteratuur(1982-2014)". Digital Bibliotheek voor de Nederlandse Letteren (in Dutch). pp. 1–4.
- Theeuwen, P. (2013). "Hoen, Pieter 't, in: Biografisch Woordenboek van Nederland: 1780-1830". Huyghens ING (in Dutch).
- Zuidema (1911). "Hoen, Pieter 't, in: P.J. Blok, P.C. Molhuysen (eds), Nieuw Nederlandsch biografisch woordenboek. Deel 1". Digitale Bibliotheek voor de Nederlandse Letteren (in Dutch). p. 1127.
