= Hulshoff =

Hulsoff is a surname. Notable people with the surname include:

- Barry Hulshoff (1946–2020), Dutch footballer
- Maria Aletta Hulshoff (1781–1846), Dutch patriot, feminist, and pamphleteer
