= Ulrik Huber =

Dutch legal scholar (1636–1694)

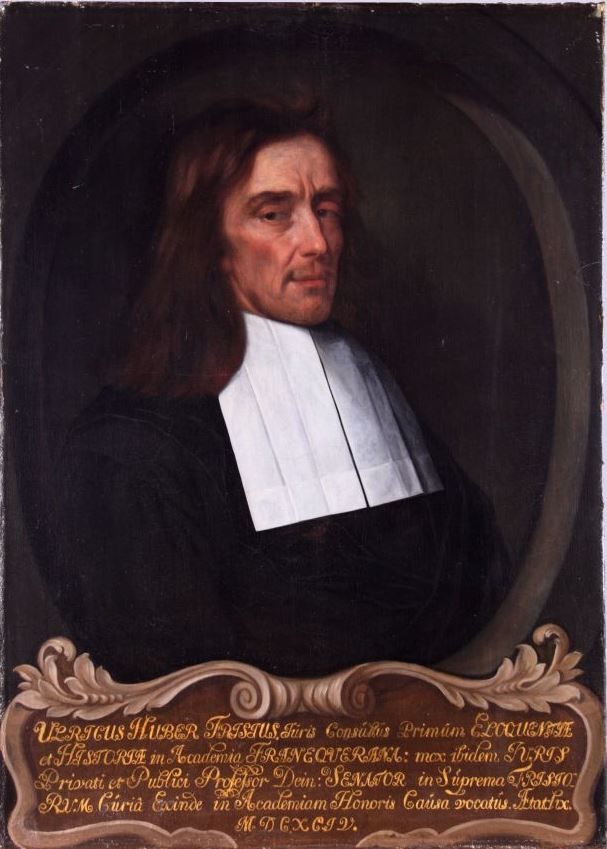
Ulrik Huber

Ulrik Huber (13 March 1636 in Dokkum – 8 November 1694 in Franeker), also known as Ulrich Huber or Ulricus Huber, was a Dutch Frisian professor of law at the University of Franeker and a political philosopher.

Huber studied in Franeker, Utrecht and Heidelberg. He started in 1657 – at a very young age – as professor of Eloquence and History at the University of Franeker and, as of 1665, he became professor of law. From 1679 to 1682, he was a judge at the Court of Appeal of Friesland and thereafter returned to his position as professor of law until his death in 1694.

His major work, De jure civitatis libri tres, was published initially in 1672 and continued to be revised until 1694. Huber considered captivity in war, criminal conviction, voluntary renunciation of liberty, and birth from a female slave legal grounds for slavery. Apart from this work, he was internationally well-known for his studies on Roman law. In the Netherlands, he is also well known for his work Heedensdaegse Rechtsgeleertheyt soo elders, als in Friesland gebruikelijk (1686, 1768) (The Jurisprudence of My Time). In this work, he presents a complete overview of the law system of Friesland at that time. In 1672, he became engaged in the public polemic about the Frisian constitution then raging in and around the States of Friesland with his pamphlet Spiegel Van Doleancie En Reformatie, Na den tegenwoordigen toestant des Vaderlandts (Mirror of Appeal and Reform, concerning the current situation of the Fatherland).

Huber's short treatise on the conflict of laws, Conflictu Legum Diversarum in Diversis Imperiis, was a highly influential work, with a large impact on conflict of laws in English and American jurisprudence.

Cornelius van Bynkershoek was one of his students at University of Franeker.

He is considered the greatest jurist of the Dutch province of Friesland ever known. At the University of Groningen, one of the institutes of the Faculty of Law is named after him.
