= Acte van Consulentschap =

1766 Secret contract between stadtholder William V and Duke Louis Ernest

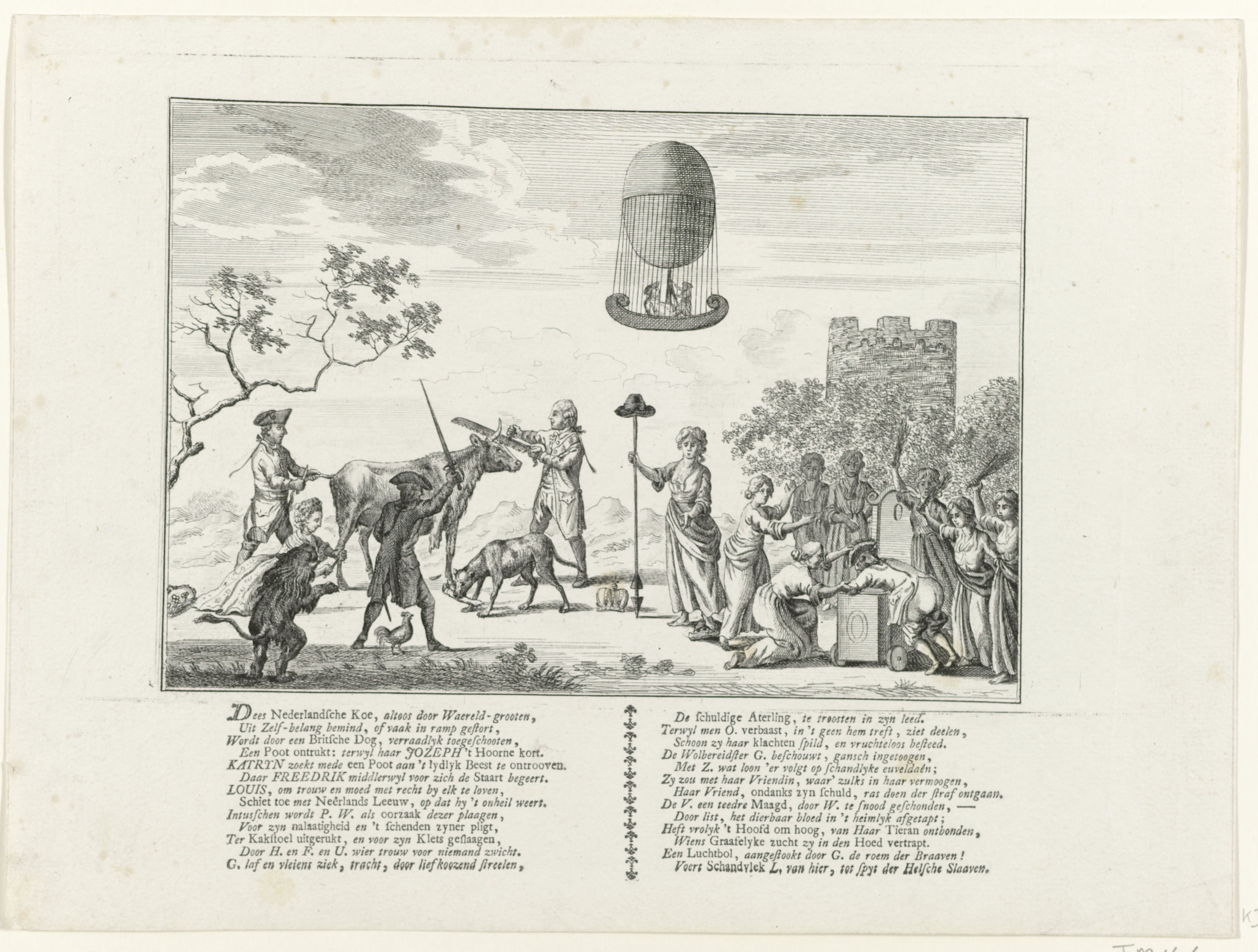
The cartoon shows an allegory about the dire state of the Dutch Republic in 1784, around the time the scandal, caused by the publication of the Acte van Consulentschap, broke.

The Acte van Consulentschap (Dutch pronunciation: [kɔnsyˈlɛntsxɑp]), in English historiography variously known as Act of Advisership, or less correctly, as Act of Consultation, was a secret, private contract between stadtholder William V, Prince of Orange of the Dutch Republic and his mentor and former guardian Duke Louis Ernest of Brunswick-Lüneburg, concluded on 3 May 1766 (shortly after William's majority), in which the latter was informally given continued powers of guardianship over the stadtholder in his private and public capacity. When the document became public in 1784, it caused such a scandal that the stadtholder's regime was almost fatally undermined in the political upheaval of the Patriottentijd.

== Background ==
When William V's father William IV, Prince of Orange died in 1751, the young prince was only three years of age. His mother Anne, Princess Royal and Princess of Orange became Regent for her son in as far as the hereditary office of stadtholder was concerned. Before his death, however, William IV had already made arrangements to give the Duke a role as her adviser. In any case, the ancillary office of Captain-General of the Dutch States Army could not be exercised by a woman, and the Duke was appointed its Captain-General. (Note: An honor which even the Duke of Marlborough had not received when he was only appointed lieutenant-Captain-General of the States Army in 1702.) The Duke remained in this position during the subsequent regencies of Landgravine Marie Louise of Hesse-Kassel and Princess Carolina of Orange-Nassau. During this entire period he had great influence on the prince's education, and an almost father-son relationship developed between the two.

== The Act and its influence ==
In the eyes of contemporaries the young prince had not fully matured before he reached his majority on 8 March 1766, and became stadtholder in his own right. The class of ruling Regenten therefore felt anxious about his taking the reins of power unchecked, and the pensionary of Delft, Pieter van Bleiswijk, a leading member of the States of Holland and the States General of the Netherlands for Holland, together with other grandees, like the Grand Pensionary Pieter Steyn took the initiative of making an arrangement in which "for the time being" the influence of the Duke would be informally continued. This was formalized in a contract (which later became known as the Acte van Consulentschap or Act of Advisorship), drawn up by van Bleiswijk, and concluded between the Prince and the Duke on 3 May 1766. Both signed it, and the Duke swore to it, according to the witness, the Princes' secretary, F.J. de Larrey (Note: The text of the Act is included as Appendix IV to chapter VIII, pp. 255-256 in Nijhoff.)

The Act consisted of our articles.

1. The Duke promised to advise and assist the Prince in military matters, and matters pertaining to all other departments of state, whenever required or needed;
2. The Duke would be obliged to advise and assist the Prince so as in good conscience to preserve the prerogatives and rights of the Prince, and to promote the welfare of the Dutch Republic, without showing bias in favor of any of the provinces, cities, members of the several States and public colleges, or private interests and citizens, all while keeping the public interest in view under all circumstances;
3. To that end the Duke would permanently accompany the Prince (especially on a tour of the country which was about to begin);
4. The Prince promised to indemnify the Duke from all accountability and responsibility to others than himself for whatever he would advise or do in the fulfillment of his responsibilities under the Act, because he did not want the Duke to account to anybody but himself, and, in case the Prince would die, the Duke would only be obliged to hand over the state papers in his possession at that time, without any obligation to give an account of his actions to the Prince's heirs.

All of this until further notice from either party.

The Act remained secret for a long time, but of course the inner circle around the Prince knew about it. If necessary, the Duke would brandish it, if challenged by other courtiers, like Willem Bentinck van Rhoon. The immediate effect of the Act was that an attempt to saddle the stadtholder with an "advisory council" was thwarted. As will be clear from the above account of the contents of the Act, it did not give the Duke formal powers over the stadtholder, but it helped him exploit the natural ascendancy he had enjoyed over William from an early age. The relationship helped to perpetuate the dependence of the younger on the older person to an "unhealthy" extent, as was recognized by many in their environment. The Duke was instrumental in obtaining the hand in marriage of Wilhelmina of Prussia, Princess of Orange, a niece of the Prussian king Frederick the Great, whom William married on 4 October 1767, but the Princess soon started to resent the Duke's influence, and she became one of his main opponents.

The Duke had many other enemies, who blamed him for many of the mistakes the Prince made. The conduct of the Fourth Anglo-Dutch War was seen as one of his main failures, and in other military respects, like the encroachments of the new emperor of Austria, Joseph II, in the Austrian Netherlands. This caused the dismissal of the Duke as Captain-General on 24 May 1782, though he remained governor of the fortress of 's-Hertogenbosch until the crisis of the Kettle War in 1784. Because of this removal the Act was no longer operational, and in any case the Duke no longer was a convenient lightning rod for the political opposition from the Patriots, who from then on more and more attacked the stadtholder himself.

When in the issues of 19, 23, 26, and 30 June 1784 of the De Post van den Neder-Rhijn, a Patriot newspaper, its editor Pieter 't Hoen published the previously secret text of the Act, a tremendous scandal broke out in the Republic, which made the position of the Duke untenable, and severely harmed the political position of the stadtholder. The fact that it was a private contract that never gave due deference to the position of the true sovereign of the country, the States General, drew 't Hoen's stentorian criticism. It proved in his eyes that the Duke (and by extension the Prince) from the beginning of William's stadtholderate had denied the true constitutional relationships within the Republic, and arrogated a "monarchical" position for the Prince, which was contrary to what that position in the eyes of the Patriots ought to be.

The scandal gave his opponents the opportunity to engineer the Duke's definitive removal. Princess Wilhelmina demanded his dismissal. The States of Holland on 18 August 1784 declared the Act null and void. In the States General they proposed his dismissal as field marshal of the States Army, a rank he still held after his dismissal as Captain-General in 1782, and his deportation from the country. The States of Friesland already had demanded this on 11 June. The Duke resigned his commission on 14 October 1784, and left the Republic for Aachen.

== Sources ==
- Klein, S.R.E. (1995). "Patriots Republicanisme. Politieke cultuur in Nederland (1766-1787)". Digitale Bibliotheek voor de Nederlandse Letteren (in Dutch).
- Nijhoff, D.C. (1889). "De Hertog van Brunswijk: eene bijdrage tot de geschiedenis van Nederland gedurende de jaren 1750-1784". Google Books (in Dutch).
- Schama, S. (1977). Patriots and Liberators. Revolution in the Netherlands 1780-1813. New York: Vintage books. ISBN 0-679-72949-6.
- Theeuwen, P.J.H.M. (2002). Pieter 't Hoen en de Post van den Neder-Rhijn (1781-1787): een bijdrage tot de kennis van de Nederlandse geschiedenis in het laatste kwart van de achttiende eeuw (in Dutch). ISBN 9065506772.
