= Johan van den Sande =

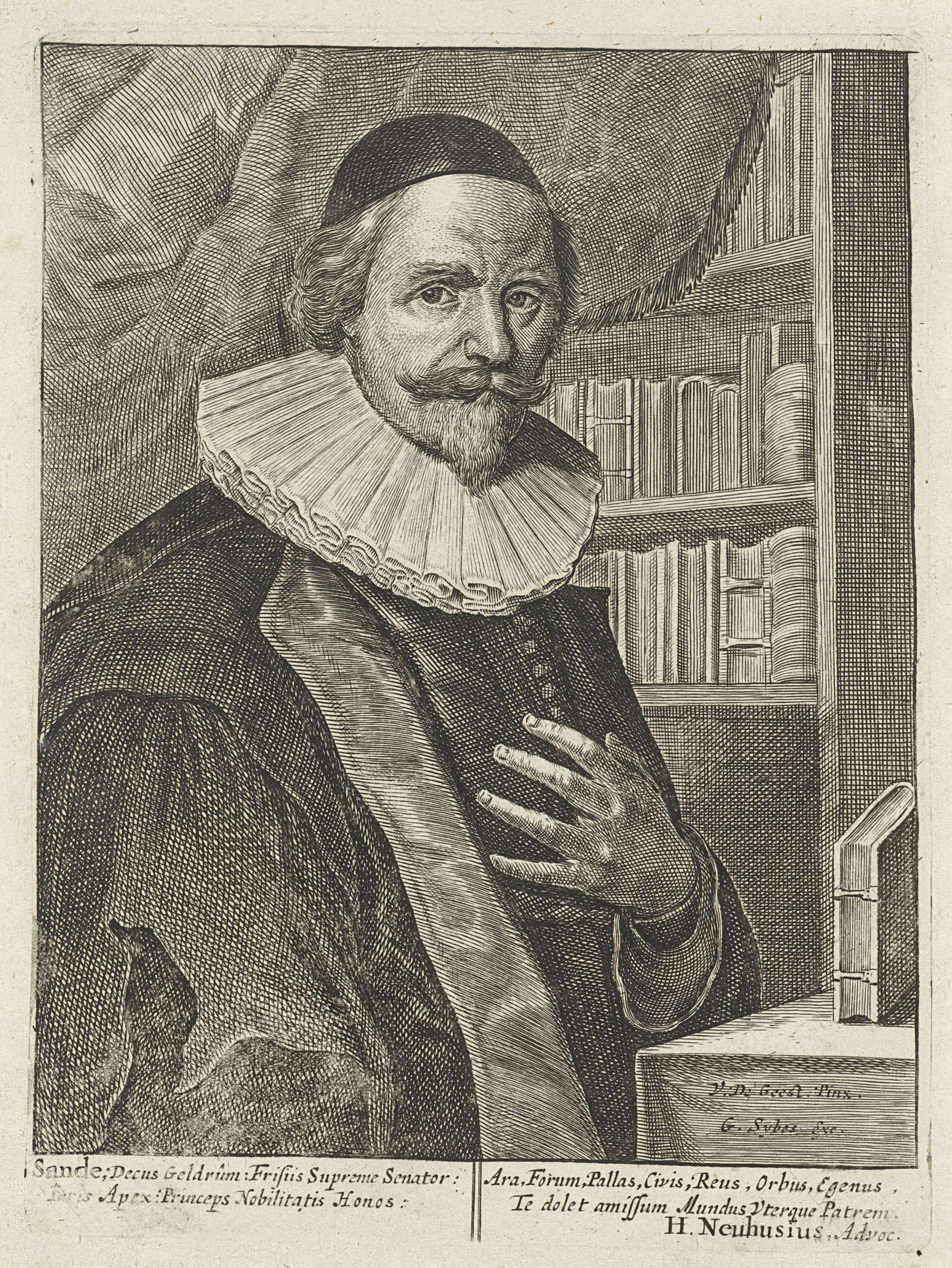
Johan van den Sande

Johan van den Sande (or Jan van Sande, in short; June 28, 1568, in Arnhem – November 17, 1638, in Leeuwarden) was a prominent writer of the common law of Friesland, one of the Dutch provinces, as well as a historian. He was born in Arnhem in the province of Gelderland and studied at the Universities of Wittenberg and Leiden. At the age of thirty he became professor at the University of Franeker (Friesland). He later became a member of the Court of Friesland. His Decisiones Curiae Frisiccae is a treatise on the law in force in Friesland illustrated with decisions of the Frisian court. He quoted from a number of other sources and a wide variety of European writers.

== Works (selection) ==
- Joannis à Sande: Commentarii duo singulares, quorum primus est De actionvm cessione. Franecherae, 1633
- Joannes à Sande: Decisiones Frisicæ siue Rervm in svprema Frisiorum curia iudicatarum. Leovardiæ, 1639
- Johan van den Sande: Kort begryp der Nederlantsche historien. 3en druk. Leeuwarden, 1651
