= University of Franeker =

Former university in the Netherlands

Coordinates: 53°11′8.66″N 5°32′20.62″E

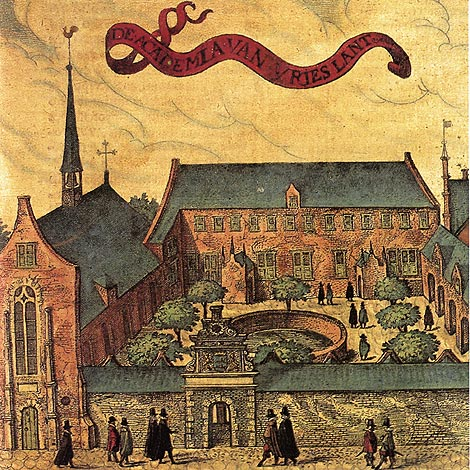
De academia van Vrieslant (Friesland Academy), 1622

The University of Franeker (1585–1811) was a university in Franeker, Friesland, the Netherlands. It was the second-oldest university of the Netherlands, founded shortly after Leiden University.

== History ==
Also known as Academia Franekerensis or the University of Friesland, it consisted of departments of Theology, Law, Medicine, Philosophy, Mathematics and Physics. Among its well-known students was Peter Stuyvesant, last director-general of the Dutch colony of New Netherland, as well as René Descartes.

Initially the university had an excellent reputation, attracting students from far and wide, but from 1700 its fortune changed. The university was disbanded by Napoleon in 1811, along with the Universities of Harderwijk and Utrecht. After the end of the French régime, the university was not restored. Instead, an Athenaeum illustre was founded, which did not have the right to issue doctoral degrees. In 1843, the Athenaeum itself was disbanded because of a lack of students.

== Legacy ==
Today, Franeker has no institute of higher education, although postgraduate students from the University of Groningen are permitted to defend their thesis in the Franeker Martinikerk, provided they are Frisian or their thesis subject has a connection to Friesland.

Two institutions continue the legacy of University of Franeker, the Academie van Franeker (established in 2018 by The Municipality of Franekeradeel, the Campus Fryslân of the University of Groningen, the Protestant Community of Franeker, and the Foundation for the Management of Diaconal Goods Franeker), and the Euler-Franeker Memorial University (chartered by the government of Curaçao, a constituent island country within the Kingdom of the Netherlands).

== Notable professors and alumni ==
- Jean-Nicolas-Sébastien Allamand (1713-1787), professor of philosophy (1747-1749) then professor of mathematics and philosophy, University of Leiden
- Lieuwe van Aitzema, historian and diplomat
- William Ames, theologian
- Willem Baudartius, theologian
- Balthasar Bekker, theologian
- Court Lambertus van Beyma, delegate of the Frisian States
- Govert Bidloo, anatomist and personal physician of William III of Orange-Nassau, Dutch stadholder and king of England
- Cornelius van Bynkershoek, jurist and legal theorist, president of the Supreme Court of the Netherlands
- Steven Blankaart Dutch physician and entomologist
- Johannes Bogerman, professor for theology, president of the Synod of Dort
- Sebald Justinus Brugmans, professor of physics and mathematics 1785
- Petrus Camper, professor of philosophy, anatomy and surgery in 1750
- Johannes Cocceius, professor for Hebrew and theology, 1643
- René Descartes (1596-1650), student (1629-1630)
- Johannes van den Driesche, professor of Oriental languages at Oxford in 1575 and in Franeker in 1585
- Nathaniel Eaton (1632), first professor of Harvard College in 1638
- Sicco van Goslinga, Dutch statesman and diplomat
- Willem van Haren, poet and politician
- Daniel Heinsius, student and later professor in Leiden
- Tiberius Hemsterhuis, professor of Greek and history, 1720–1740
- Ulrik Huber, professor of law and a political philosopher
- Theodorus van Kooten, professor of Latin language and history, poet and politician
- Johann Samuel König, professor for mathematics and philosophy, 1744–1749
- Joannes Antonides van der Linden, physician and medical bibliographer, 1639-1651
- Sibrandus Lubbertus, professor of theology 1585-1625
- Johannes Maccovius, professor of theology in 1615, brother in law of Saskia van Uylenburgh
- Adriaan Metius, mathematician and astronomer, professor extraordinarius in 1598
- Jacob Perizonius, professor eloquence and history 1682-1693
- Murk van Phelsum, physician
- Johan van den Sande (1568-1648), professor of law
- Petrus Stuyvesant (1612-1672), governor of New Amsterdam
- Jean Henri van Swinden, professor of physics and philosophy in 1766
- Johan Valckenaer, lawyer, patriot and diplomat
- Lodewijk Caspar Valckenaer, professor of Greek 1741-1765
- William IV, Prince of Orange (1711-1751), stadtholder of the Netherlands
- Eise Eisinga (1724-1828) amateur astronomer who built the Eise Eisinga Planetarium in his house in Franeker, later became professor of astronomy

== See also ==
- List of early modern universities in Europe
