= Cornelius van Bynkershoek =

Dutch jurist and legal theorist

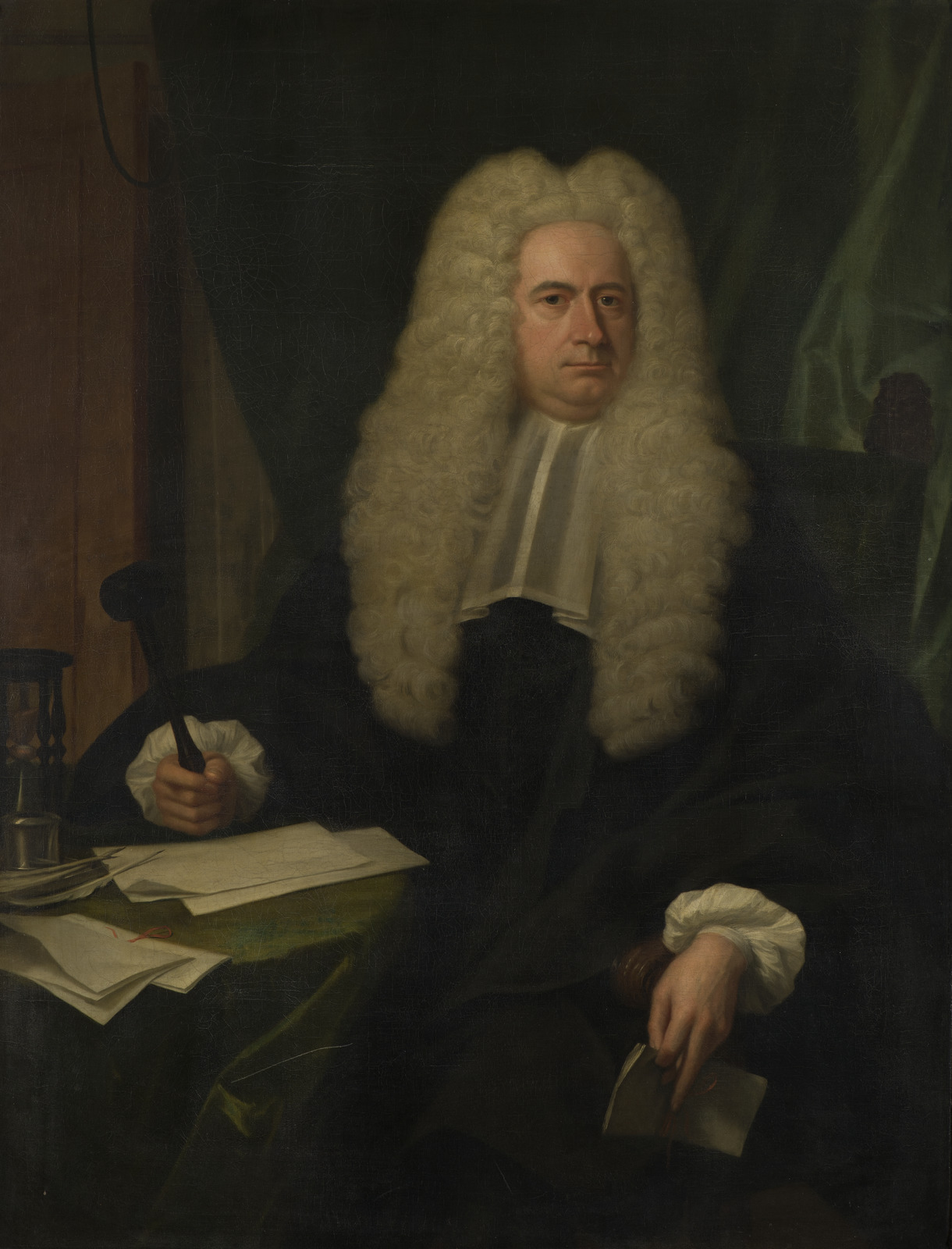
Portrait of Van Bynkershoek by Philip van Dijk, 1733 (Collection Cultural Heritage Agency of the Netherlands).

Cornelis van Bijnkershoek (a.k.a. Cornelius van Bynkershoek) (29 May 1673, in Middelburg – 16 April 1743, in The Hague) was a Dutch jurist and legal theorist. He contributed to the development of international law, in particular the development of the Law of the Sea.

== Early life ==
His father was a merchant. He was educated at the University of Franeker where he studied under Ulrik Huber.

== Career ==
After two years study, he began to apply himself to jurisprudence. He resolved to reform the common law of his country, and took as the basis of a new system the principles of Roman law.

He later contributed to the development of international law in works like De Dominio Maris Dissertatio (1702); Observationes Juris Romani (1710), of which a continuation in four books appeared in 1733; the treatise De foro legatorum (1721); and the Quaestiones Juris Publici (1737). Complete editions of his works were published after his death; one in folio at Geneva in 1761, and another in two volumes folio at Leiden in 1766. He was appointed a judge of the Hoge Raad van Holland en Zeeland (Supreme Court of the Dutch Republic) in 1703 and served as president of the court from 1724 to 1743.

Van Bynkershoek was especially important in the development of the Law of the Sea. In particular he furthered Hugo Grotius' idea that coastal states have a right to the adjoining waters the width of which had to correspond to the capacity of exercising an effective control over it, that he expressed in his famous book De Iure Belli ac Pacis. Bynkershoek translated Grotius idea into practical terms, by arguing that such effective control has to correspond to the range of the coastal state's weapons: "terrae potestas finitur ubi finitur armorum vis". However, instead of him, it was Italian Ferdinand Galiami who calculated the range of the most advanced cannon at the time to three nautical miles or a league. This idea became common practice and was known as the "cannon shot rule" and was regarded as the internationally accepted measure of the width of the territorial sea.

He has been commomorated in The Netherlands e.g. with a road named after him in Utrecht.
