= De Post van den Neder-Rhijn =

Magazine

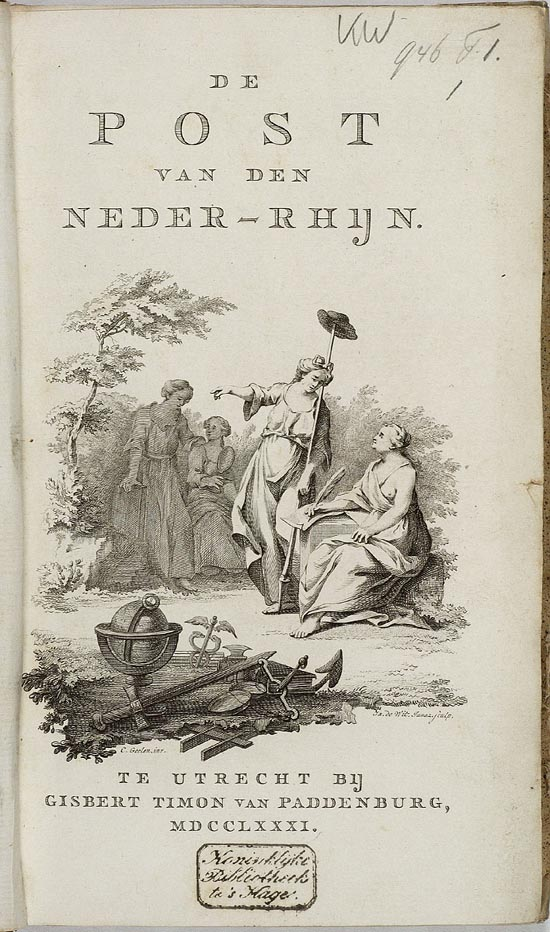
- Frontispiece of the magazine in 1781.
- Editor-in-chief: Pieter ’t Hoen
- Categories: politics, patriotism, republicanism
- Frequency: weekly
- Circulation: 3,000
- Publisher: Gisbert Timon van Paddenburg
- First issue: 20 January 1781
- Final issue: 14 September 1787 (December 1799)
- Country: Dutch Republic
- Based in: Utrecht
- Language: Dutch

De Post van den Neder-Rhijn ("The Post of the Nether Rhine") was a Patriot magazine from 1781 to 1787, at the end of the Dutch Republic. It was one of the first opinion weeklies in the Netherlands, and was edited by Pieter 't Hoen (1744–1828).

Through the first publication of De Post van den Neder-Rhijn in January 1781 the periodical political opinion press was born in the Netherlands.

After the Prussian invasion of Holland in September 1787 and the following Orange Restoration, the paper initially tried to placate the stadtholder William V, Prince of Orange by welcoming his return, but shortly thereafter the publication was discontinued, and 't Hoen fled abroad (probably France or the Southern Netherlands). In March 1795, after Revolutionary France's successful Flanders campaign and the proclamation of the Batavian Republic, he returned and resumed the publication of what was now called De nieuwe post van den Neder-Rhyn ("The New Post of the Nether Rhine") until December 1799. A separate editorial staff without 't Hoen published a few more issues in 1797 en 1798 using the magazine's old title.
