= Maria Aletta Hulshoff =

Dutch Patriot, feminist, and pamphleteer

Maria Aletta Hulshoff (pen name, Mietje; 30 July 1781 in Amsterdam – 10 February 1846 in Amsterdam) was a Dutch Patriot, feminist and pamphleteer.

== Life ==
Maria was the daughter of the Mennonite preacher Allard Hulshoff (1734-1795) and Anna Debora van Oosterwijk (1745-1812), and for her whole life held onto her father's democratic, Patriotic and anti-Orangist views.

Her first pamphlet, writes her biographer Geertje Wiersma, was a dissertation on democracy written by the prominent patriot Samuel Iperusz Wiselius - it is possible it was published under her name to protect Wiselius, the real author. She was taken into custody but because the authorities understood that the young woman was not the real author and the evidence against Wiselius was insufficient, the affair came to nothing.

She wrote her second pamphlet, Oproeping aan het Bataafse volk ("An Appeal to the Batavian People", 1806), under her own name. She took up the task when she heard rumours that Napoleon was considering making one of his brothers king of Holland, and wrote in it against the imposition of Louis Bonaparte as king of Holland and for the Patriot Johan Valckenaer as her choice for the leadership of the Batavian Republic, making a prediction in the introduction which later came true:

Who has not heard the rumours? The rumours that prince Louis Bonaparte will rule under the title of king over the Batavians....Since the Eighty Years' War, we have been oppressed by the princes of Orange. With help of the French, we could finally have dismissed the hated stadholder eleven years ago. Truly. For they wanted to give us back the rights that belonged to us.... Over us, one man wants to hand a sceptre to a strange sovereign. We will turn into a province [of the French empire]. One man will make us slaves. The state will fail. Trade will dry up. Our sons will be conscripted as soldiers of a strange ruler, led away to the slaughterhouse in faraway lands.

All but five copies of this pamphlet were destroyed by the authorities. Maria Aletta Hulshoff's family therefore kidnapped her and took her to safety in Bentheim, Germany, but - in combative mood - she escaped the grip of her family and returned to Holland. She sought the publicity that a trial would bring and demanded in a letter that she immediately be arrested. The strategy of her defenders Valckenaer and Willem Bilderdijk was not based on her birth, but was an apologia founded on the mental disturbance of a clergyman's daughter, stating that she was "in such a way touchingly thrown away from her naturally calm state of mind by her body" ("zodanig een aandoenlijk en door aandoenlijkheid buiten de natuurlijke staat van geestbedaardheid geworpen juffer"). The background to this defence is the 19th-century view that an unsatisfied uterus (hystera being the Greek for uterus) makes a woman hysterical. This defense would make the unmarried Mietje unconvincing as a politician and so she dismissed Bilderdijk and Valckenaer and mounted her own defence.

During the trial Mietje suffered a nervous breakdown, which became apparent when, at the moment the judges ordered her to apologise, she suddenly could not produce a single word. With no defence, she thus was condemned on 18 July 1806 to two years at her own expense in the stadsverbeterhuis (city house of correction), a sentence she served. The pious minister's daughter passed the time singing "clean religious and republican songs". When freed, she published a pamphlet against the Napoleontic conscription that characterized it as a "terrible and hateful requirement" ("verfoeilijke hatelijke requisitie"). This attack on the backbone of the Bonapartes' military dictatorship put her on its list of enemies of the regime, and she was to have been locked up in the castle at Woerden, one of the prisons for political adversaries of Napoleon's regime, but she got to know of this and - disguised as a man - fled to Amsterdam before she could be imprisoned. The description given of her broadcast by the authorities after her escape read:

Maria Aletta Hulshoff, 27 Years old, short and slight of figure, a little crooked; dark of complexion, dark brown hair, nose and mouth average,

She was taken in and helped by her relation Wiselius and her mother's seamstress. Mietje then established herself in London where she got to know her Mennonite relations. Reports that she wanted to try to murder Napoleon in 1810 in his palace in Amsterdam or Apeldoorn appear to be unsupported by trustworthy sources, for the sources make clear he was well-guarded during his stays. From 1811 until 1820 she lived as a voluntary exile in New York City in the United States, where she wrote and published in English her "Handbook for pacifist-republicans" under the title "Republicans' Peace Manual". The subtitle of this work was borrowed from Propertius' Latin motto "In magnis volvisse satis" (or "sat est"), meaning "It is enough to have aimed for great things". The progressive Maria Aletta Hulshoff returned to the Netherlands in 1820 to take on further political activities. In 1827, in her last pamphlet, she wrote in favour of hygiene and vaccination against smallpox.

Like many Mennonites, Maria remained single her whole life and had no children. In her rooms at the Egelantiersgracht by the Lijnbaansgracht, on the upper storey of number 99, all that was found after her death was "an empty cabinet, a desk with some female clothes of little value, two boxes of books and writings, a rag-blanket, two old chairs, a bed with two cushions, a few further bits of undignified junk". Yet was she rich, for she owned 22,400 guilder in paper money that she had left with Wiselius and other friends.

== Reception ==
Contemporaries named her "geëxalteerd", "dweepzuchtig" or "hysterisch" ("hysterical"), since it was then considered that a woman should always hold her tongue on everything in the male-controlled domains of science, morals and politics. Hulshoff was happy to compare herself with Joan of Arc and, like Joan, she played some part in bringing on herself some of the dangers she encountered.

== Works ==
- De "Verzameling van brieven, gewisseld tusschen Valerius Publicola te Amsterdam en Caius Manlius te Utrecht" 1804
- Oproeping van het Bataafsche volk, om deszelfs denkwijze en wil openlijk aan den dag te leggen, tegen de overheersching door eenen vreemdeling, waarmede het vaderland bedreigd wordt (Amsterdam 1806). (This was probably the work of Samuel Wiselius, but the pamphlet only appeared under her name.)
- Droevige klagt van een aalmoeseniers-weeskind (z.p. 1808).
- Waarschouwing tegen de requisitie, welke men in ons vaderland wil invoeren [...] (Haarlem 1809).
- Peace republican’s manual, or the French constitution of 1793 and the Declaration of the rights of man and of citizens […] (New York 1817).
- Gevolgen der voldoening, of iets over de vrage: Verkondigt Gods heilig woord, dat een gedeelte van het menschelijk geslacht, hier namaals, zonder einde boosaardig en lijdend zal blijven; of verkondigt hetzelve de eindelijke zaligheid van alle menschen? [...] (Amsterdam 1820).
- De koepok-inenting beschouwd, en tien bedenkingen overwogen: voor minkundigen (Amsterdam 1827).

== Sources ==
- "Mietje Hulshoff was geen mietje", article by Saskia Jansen in het Handelsblad, 6-8-2007
- P. van Limburg Brouwer, "Het leven van Samuel Iperuszoon Wiselius" (Groningen 1846).
- J.A. Sillem, "Het leven van mr. Johan Valckenaer" (1759-1821). Naar onuitgegeven bronnen bewerkt 2 (Amsterdam 1876) 203-211 en bijlage xxv.
- J. van den Bergh van Eysinga-Elias, "Het intellectueele leven der Nederlandsche vrouw in 1813", in: Tentoonstelling ‘De Vrouw 1813–1913’. Twaalf voordrachten (Zaltbommel 1913) 191-220.
- J.M. H[ulshoff] en H.Ch. H[ulshoff], de beschrijving van het geslacht Hulshoff in de reeks Nederland’s Patriciaat (het "Blauwe boekje", deel 28 (1942).
- Johanna Stouten, "Willem Anthonie Ockerse" (1760-1826). Leven en werk (Amsterdam 1982).
- Johanna Stouten, "Maria Aletta Hulshoff" (1781-1846), dweepster of idealiste?". Tijdschrift over Nederlandse letterkunde I (1984) 2, 72-79.
- Johan Joor, "De adelaar en het lam". Onrust, opruiing en onwilligheid in Nederland ten tijde van het Koninkrijk Holland en de inlijving bij het Franse keizerrijk (1806-1813) (Amsterdam 2000).
- Geertje Wiersma, "Mietje Hulshoff of De aanslag op Napoleon" (Amsterdam 2003).
- Dr. A.J.C.M. Gabriëls, "Maria Aletta Hulshoff (1781-1846), politiek activiste en publiciste", in het Digitaal Vrouwenlexicon van Nederland, een digitale publicatie uit 2004.
- Willem Frijhoff, Marijke Spies, Dutch Culture in a European Perspective, p233
