= Johan Valckenaer =

Dutch professor who specialized in Roman law

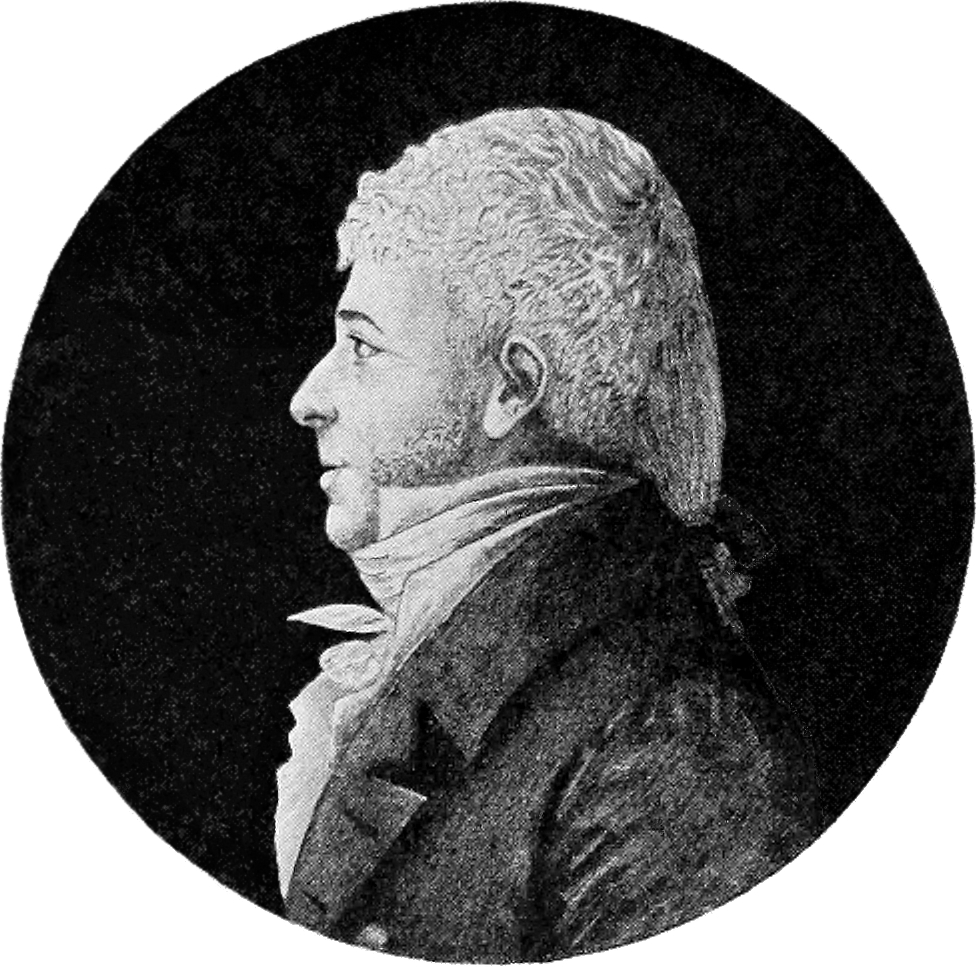
Physionotrace of Johan Valckenaer by Edme Quenedey des Ricets

Johan Valckenaer (Franeker, 21 January 1759 – Bennebroek, 25 January 1821) was a Dutch professor who specialized in Roman law. He was a passionate and combative patriot who promoted the right to bear weapons. In 1787 he went in exile in France and in 1793 he made proposals for a constitutional monarchy. After his return in 1795 he became professor in Constitutional law, a member of National Assembly, a diplomat and financial counsellor.

== Life ==
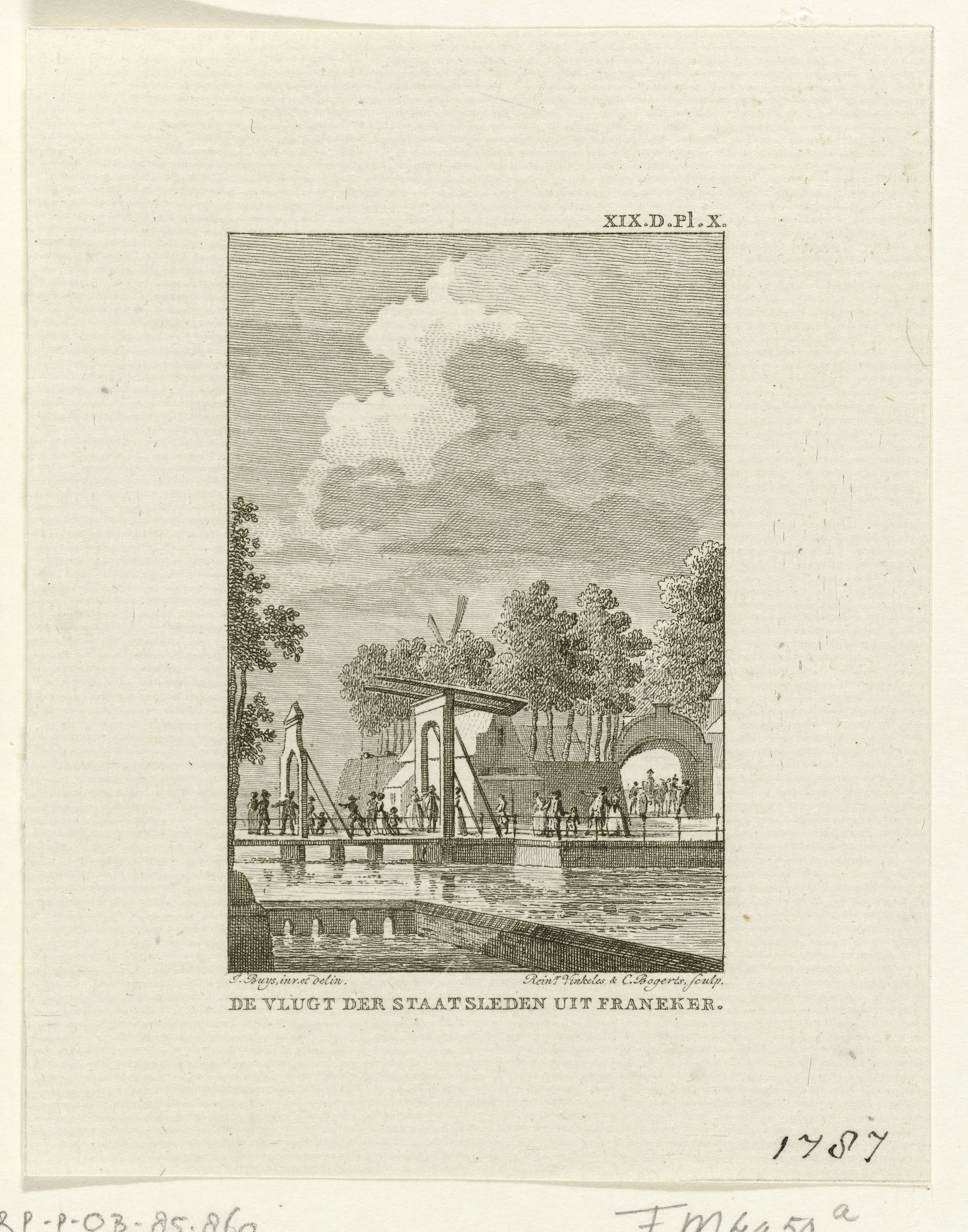
Flee of patriots from Franeker, 1787

His father Lodewijk Caspar Valckenaer was Franeker university professor in Old Greek and, in 1766, was appointed to succeed Tiberius Hemsterhuis at Leiden. His family was related to the Luzacs, publishers of the internationally renowned newspaper Gazette de Leyde – Emilie Luzac and her father Johan were Valckenaer's relatives. Johan became deeply interested in classical and French writers such as Voltaire and Rousseau. He graduated in 1781. In 1785 he married Rutgera Joanna de Lille.

In 1782, Valckenaer was appointed at the University of Franeker, and on 23 September 1785 he gave a speech when it celebrated the bicentennial with an armed parade; the anxious stadtholder cancelled his visit. In May 1787 was discharged for his membership of an exercitiegenootschap. He was appointed in Utrecht (in Natural law), then a democratic stronghold. Early September Valckenaer supported Court Lambertus van Beyma, trying to create an alternative Provincial States at Franeker. A few weeks later, after the Prussian invasion of Holland, many patriots fled in the first place to Amsterdam, then to Brussels and Saint-Omer in northwest France. The leaders of the Patriots, such as Valckenaer, Wybo Fijnje, H. W. Daendels, and Adam Gerard Mappa lived temporarily in a castle in Watten and formed a kind of commune, that jointly bought a billiards set, restored the rooms and grew vegetables.

== France ==
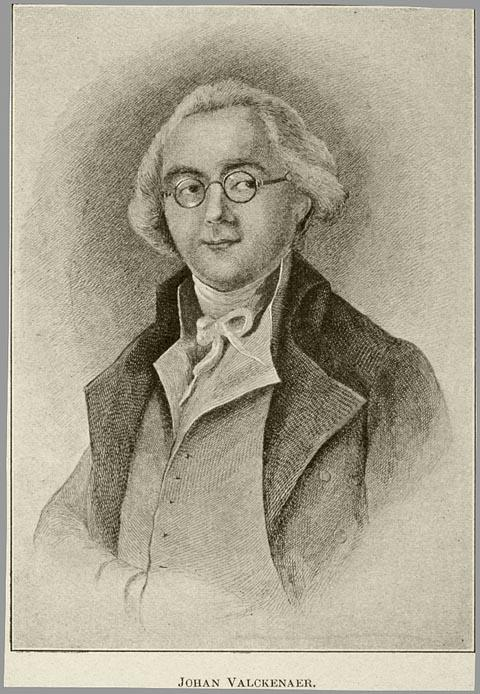
Johan Valckenaer.

In between Valckenaer and Van Beyma were no friends anymore. In his flight from Franeker, Van Beyma forgot to take signed and extremely chargeable documents with him, so that a large group of Frisian patriots could be jailed and within two years condemned. Valckenaer was furious. Then both men also got into a quarrel over the distribution of the travel expenses. Nevertheless, Van Beyma and Valckenaer both organized the benefit payments originating from the French state. A difference of understanding between Valckenaer and Van Beyma about leadership in politics, the establishment of an employment project, a shipbuilding enterprise in Gravelines, the care of the administration and the size of the payments brought about an even more violent break between them, with Valckenaeristen and Beymanisten factions of Patriots fighting each other in pamphlets. The dispute reached a climax in 1791. Valckenaer got no payment from Van Beyma, but did get the support of the aristocratic patriot members of the former political establishment and so won the dispute. The commune was dissolved and Valckenaer traveled to Lyon (November 1791), Montpellier, Bordeaux, the Dutch Republic (April 1792), and Paris (January 1793), where a Batavian Revolutionary Committee was set up, which lost support from the French revolutionary government. Valckenaer attended the Jacobin Club and was influenced by Camille Desmoulins. In June 1794, during the Great Terror, he, Nicolaas van Staphorst and others left for Switzerland. After the fall of Robespierre they returned to Paris. They met with Lazare Carnot, and Courtois, members of Comité du salut public and Dutch diplomats whose intention was to hasten an invasion. Johan Valckenaar, who lived in Bièvres, Essonne, presented himself as a key figure who handed out jobs.

== Batavian Republic ==
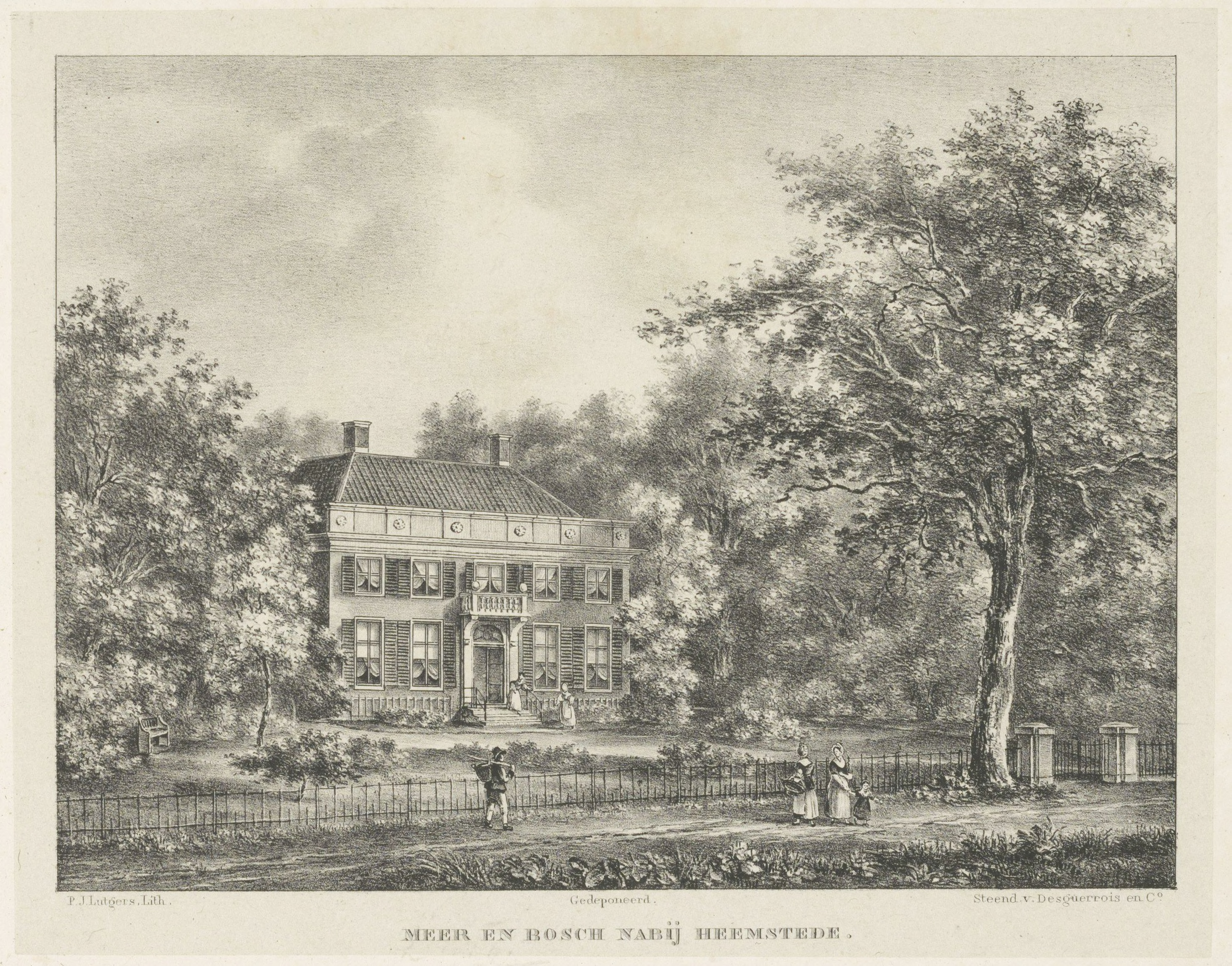
Meer en Bosch near Heemstede, lithography.

In January 1795, the Armée du Nord carried out a velvet revolution in Holland. Within a few months he was appointed at the University of Leiden, where he prepared papers for a conviction of Laurens Pieter van de Spiegel and the stadtholder. Valckenaer was more engaged in political activities than in tutoring the students. In 1796, he was chosen as a member of the National Assembly of the Batavian Republic. He was influenced by the French Constitution of 1791, and not long after he was of opinion that the revolution had come to an impasse. Before the end of the year he accepted an embassy to Madrid, and attempted to get Spanish support against England.

In the Netherlands, he retired and chose to be a diligent worker on his estate. In 1801 he lived near Noordwijkerhout. In 1805 he had contact with Maria Hulshoff. Under king Louis Bonaparte, he became a financial counsellor. Till 1810 he lived at "Meer en Bosch" in Heemstede. He was elected in the water board of the area. He moved to another mansion outside Bennebroek, where he invited his friends Theodorus van Kooten (who died there), Johannes van der Palm, Samuel Iperusz Wiselius, Willem Bilderdijk and Anton Reinhard Falck.

== Sources ==
- This article is based entirely or partially on its equivalent on Dutch Wikipedia.
- J.A. Sillem (1883) Het leven van mr. Johan Valckenaer (1759-1821)
- Rosendaal, J. (2003) Bataven! Nederlandse vluchtelingen in Frankrijk 1787-1795
- Schama, S. (1977) Patriots and Liberators. Revolution in the Netherlands 1780-1830, p. 120, 121, 133, 143, 144-52, 154-5, 160-1, 198-200, 202, 213, 260, 267-8, 272-3, 290, 324-5, 328, 382, 418, 476, 499, 582, 613, 631, 643, 651-3.
