= Court Lambertus van Beyma =

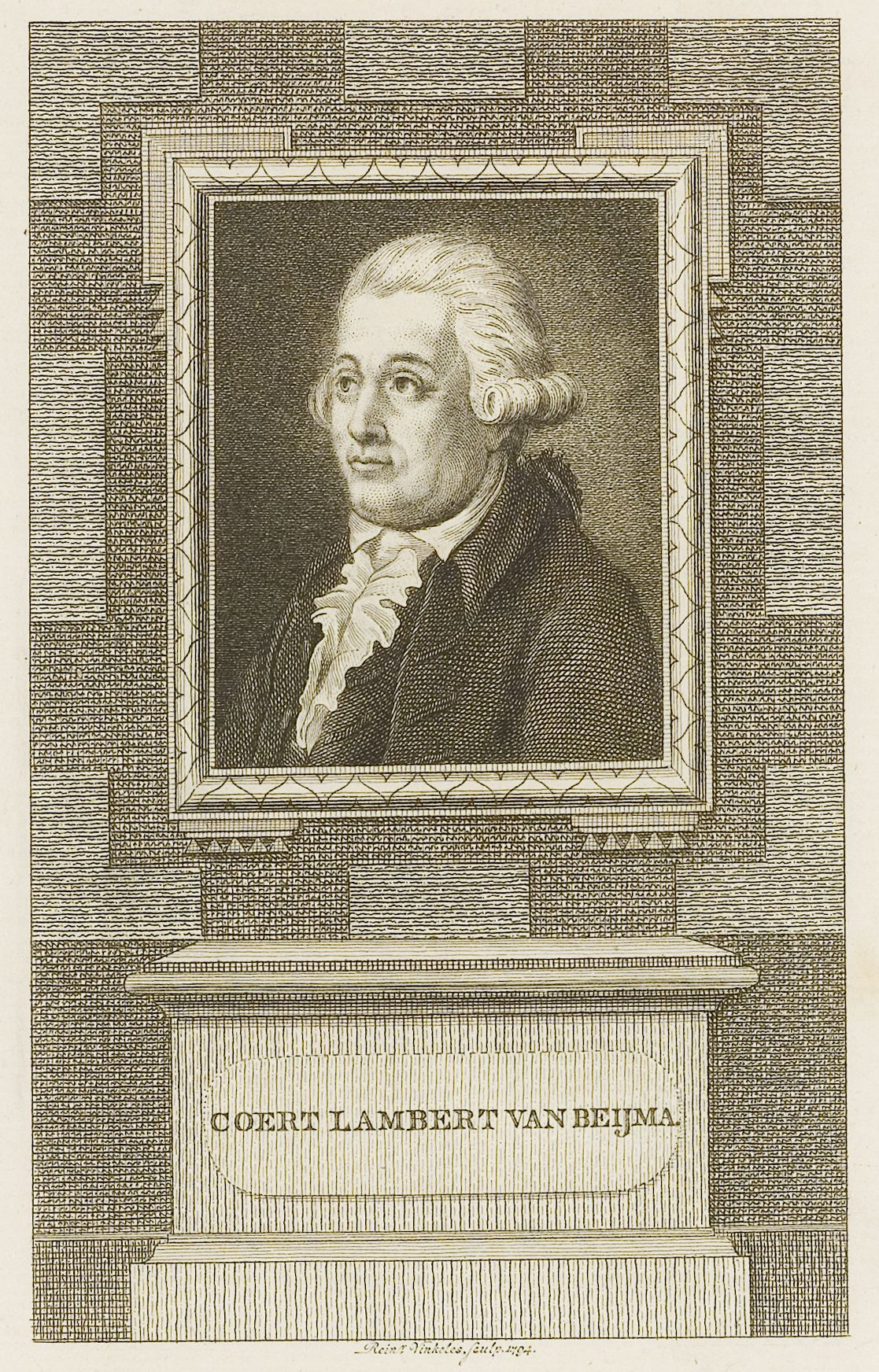
Coert Lambertus van Beyma, engraving by R. Vinkeles and C. Bogerts

Coert or Court Lambertus van Beyma (Harlingen, 5 February 1753 – Dronrijp, 7 September 1820), son of Julius Matthijs van Beyma and Fokel Helena van Burmania, was a public notary and auctioneer, delegate and representative of the Frisian States, and the radical leader of the Frisian patriots. He was the initiator of a Frisian coup and spent seven years in exile in north-western France. On his return to the Netherlands in 1795, he became a delegate to the National Assembly of the newly established Batavian Republic.

== Life ==
His father had been Secretary to the Admiralty of Friesland in Harlingen, and his mother equally descended from a Frisian noble grietman family. As a law student, Van Beyma gave a speech in 1769 during the visit of stadholder William V to Franeker. He continued his studies in 1774 at Leiden University. Court Lambertus became a delegate to the Frisian States in 1776. In 1780, he however failed to become the grietman of West-Dongeradeel, though he did achieve the position of Secretary. In that capacity, he corresponded with Joan van der Capellen tot den Pol. Together they planned petitions for the built-up of a provincial army, the recognition of the new United States of America and to restrict the power of the stadtholder. In February 1782 Van Beyma undertook an attempt in the Frisian States to put into practice article VIII of the Union of Utrecht, which would effectively allow for a general arming of the population. When Van Beyma in 1783 achieved a successful alliance between eight Frisian cities, the Patriots gained further influence and power. Through the development of a fixed time-table schedule, the important posts within the Provincial States were subsequently attributed in a more democratic manner.

A provincial army, established a few months after the Kettle War and the subsequent departure of Ludwig Ernst van Brunswick-Lüneburg-Bevern in 1784/85, lead to strong resistance among the aristocracy. Most aristocrats were republican, but with little sympathy for the democratising movement. The Frisian States were increasingly divided over the newly formed local and provincial militia. Within a few weeks of the stadtholder and his family visiting Leeuwarden, a new city council regulation was introduced, which came into effect on 1 June 1787, providing stricter requirements for the election of new members of the vroedschap (i.e. banning Catholics, Mennonites and poor Patriots from being appointed).

=== Utrecht ===
Early August 1786, Van Beyma, J. Roorda, A.C.J. de Beere, C. van den Burg and J. L. Huber attended a national meeting of the vrijcorpsen and exercitiegenootschappen in Utrecht, 'only to hear and to see'. The Utrecht Patriots made skillful use of the presence of more than 13,000 of its members and of many important public figures. Present among them were H.W. Daendels, still a young lawyer from Hattem, but also Gerrit Paape, the journalist from Delft, Pieter Vreede, a textile manufacturer from Leiden, and John Adams, the American envoy at the time. On Wednesday morning, 2 August 1786, in the presence of the assembled exercitiegenootschappen, sixteen "democratically" chosen Patriots were elected to the Utrecht vroedschap. Van Beyma left the next day and handed over the presidency to Jacob van Manen, secretary of the Utrecht vrijcorps. Probably Van Beyma, who - according to advertisements in the "Leeuwarder Courant" from those days - led weekly public auctions, no longer could or wanted to be present in person at the parades and celebrations.

=== Franeker ===
Mid August 1787, Friesland's disavow of Holland, which was threatened with an occupation by a Prussian army of 26.000 because it had refused to apologize after the apprehension of Wilhelmina of Prussia, lead to a crisis. Van Beyma subsequently led a coup against the Frisian States out of Franeker, a local University town. Franeker was put in a state of defence and the coup leaders organized the supply of a wagon-train with munitions via Makkum, a small port. A flying-column of volunteers occupied a number of the Frisian cities, putting their internally divided vroedschappen under pressure to recognize the so-called Pretense Staten in Franeker. On the approach of the Prussian troops, Van Beyma panicked and threatened to breach the dike near Lemmer, so that the Prussians would be halted by the resulting floodings. On Sunday, September 23, 1787 - after the religious service - the Patriots in Friesland however came to realize that there had been insufficient support, that their financial means were limited, and that France would not come to their aid, as hoped for. They therefore fled and retreated to Amsterdam and Northern France. As a consequence of their hurried retreat, either Van Beyma, or his secretary Van Altena, left behind a bundle of important and highly compromising petitions concerning the recovery of rights and freedoms. Thus, two years later it became very easy for a court to convict the leading group of Patriots from Friesland (19 from Franeker, 12 from Bolsward and two from Leeuwarden). Johan Valckenaer, the professor in Roman law, who had been van his travelling-companion between Amsterdam and Brussels, took van Beyma's carelessness very hard.

=== Saint-Omer ===
On 15 May 1791 van Beyma held a speech in the Jacobin club and asked the French for support. After his visit to Paris, Van Beyma was put in charge of the management of the payments to the Dutch émigrés in Pas-de-Calais. A new quarrel arose with Valckenaer who meanwhile defended the French Constitution of 1791. The exiles, divided into 'Valckenaerists' and 'Beymanists', fought it out through pamphlets. The dispute reached a climax when Valckenaer - still not getting payment from Van Beyma - considered emigrating to the USA. Valckenaer won the support of the aristocratic Patriots who had been members of the former political establishment but also of the committees in Paris. Van Beyma was involved in the "Comité Révolutionaire Batave", organized the Batavian Legion in connection with Jean Conrad de Kock. In February 1794 Van Beyma and four others were imprisoned, but released in September.

=== The Batavian Republic ===
Between the summer of 1795 and early 1796 van Beyma was not politically active but he returned to the political scene when the new National representatives were elected, winning five out of eleven districts. As Secretary to the First National Assembly he turned out, however, to be mainly preoccupied with indemnity claims and taking vengeance over his old adversaries, the former regents. In a subsequent fight between the Federalists (to which van Beyma belonged) and the more centrally-oriented Unitarists in December 1797, the first fraction lost and van Beyma was removed from his function and effectively detained. After his release on August 22, 1798, he obtained the position of 'Advokaat-fiscaal' at the former Admiralty of Friesland in Harlingen, which he kept until 1806. He died at his house Schatzenburg in Dronrijp on September 7, 1820.
