= 1693 =

1693 in various calendars
- Gregorian calendar: 1693; MDCXCIII
- Ab urbe condita: 2446
- Armenian calendar: 1142; ԹՎ ՌՃԽԲ
- Assyrian calendar: 6443
- Balinese saka calendar: 1614–1615
- Bengali calendar: 1099–1100
- Berber calendar: 2643
- English Regnal year: 5 Will. & Mar. – 6 Will. & Mar.
- Buddhist calendar: 2237
- Burmese calendar: 1055
- Byzantine calendar: 7201–7202
- Chinese calendar: 壬申年 (Water Monkey); 4390 or 4183 — to — 癸酉年 (Water Rooster); 4391 or 4184
- Coptic calendar: 1409–1410
- Discordian calendar: 2859
- Ethiopian calendar: 1685–1686
- Hebrew calendar: 5453–5454
- Hindu calendars
- Vikram Samvat: 1749–1750
- Shaka Samvat: 1614–1615
- Kali Yuga: 4793–4794
- Holocene calendar: 11693
- Igbo calendar: 693–694
- Iranian calendar: 1071–1072
- Islamic calendar: 1104–1105
- Japanese calendar: Genroku 6 (元禄６年)
- Javanese calendar: 1616–1617
- Julian calendar: Gregorian minus 10 days
- Korean calendar: 4026
- Minguo calendar: 219 before ROC 民前219年
- Nanakshahi calendar: 225
- Thai solar calendar: 2235–2236
- Tibetan calendar: ཆུ་ཕོ་སྤྲེ་ལོ་ (male Water-Monkey); 1819 or 1438 or 666 — to — ཆུ་མོ་བྱ་ལོ་ (female Water-Bird); 1820 or 1439 or 667

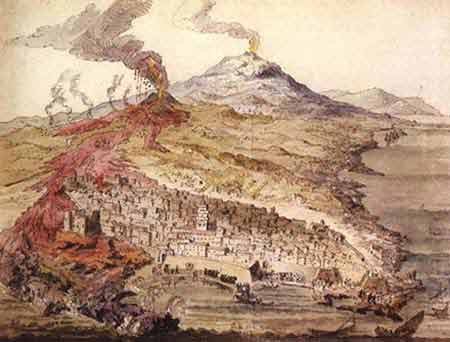
January 11: Mount Etna volcano erupts in Italy, leading to earthquake that kills 60,000 people.

1693 (MDCXCIII) was a common year starting on Thursday of the Gregorian calendar and a common year starting on Sunday of the Julian calendar, the 1693rd year of the Common Era (CE) and Anno Domini (AD) designations, the 693rd year of the 2nd millennium, the 93rd year of the 17th century, and the 4th year of the 1690s decade. As of the start of 1693, the Gregorian calendar was 10 days ahead of the Julian calendar, which remained in localized use until 1923.

== Events ==
=== January–March ===
- January 11 – The Mount Etna volcano erupts in Italy, causing a devastating earthquake that kills 60,000 people in Sicily and Malta.
- January 22 – A total lunar eclipse is visible across North and South America.
- February 8 – The College of William & Mary in Williamsburg, Virginia is granted a Royal charter.
- February 27 – The publication of the first women's magazine, titled The Ladies' Mercury, takes place in London. It is published by the Athenian Society.
- March 27 – Bozoklu Mustafa Pasha becomes the new Grand Vizier of the Ottoman Empire, after Sultan Ahmed II appoints him as the successor of Çalık Ali Pasha.

=== April–June ===
- April 4 – Anne Palles becomes the last accused witch to be executed for witchcraft in Denmark, after having been convicted of using powers of sorcery. King Christian V accepts her plea not to be burned alive, and she is beheaded before her body is set afire.
- April 5 – The Order of Saint Louis, the first medal to be awarded in France to military personnel who are not members of nobility, is created by order of King Louis XIV, and named after his ancestor, King Louis IX.
- April 28 – The 90-gun English Royal Navy warship HMS Windsor Castle is wrecked beyond repair on the Goodwin Sands.
- April – Tituba, a slave who had been convicted at the Salem witch trials of practicing witchcraft after making a confession, is released from jail in Boston after 13 months when an unknown purchaser pays her jail fees.
- May 18 – Forces of Louis XIV of France attack Heidelberg, capital of the Electorate of the Palatinate.
- May 22 – Heidelberg is taken by the invading French forces; on May 23 Heidelberg Castle is surrendered, after which the French blow up its towers using mines.
- June 5 – The first performance of the opera Didon by French composer Henri Desmarets takes place at the Théâtre du Palais-Royal in Paris.
- June 27 – Nine Years' War – Battle of Lagos off Portugal: The French fleet defeats the joint Dutch and English fleet.

=== July–September ===
- July 17 – A total lunar eclipse is visible in New Zealand and across the Pacific Ocean.
- July 29 – Nine Years' War – Battle of Landen: William III of England is defeated by the French (with Irish Jacobite mercenaries).
- August 21 – The Indian Ocean port of Pondicherry, capital of French India is captured by a 17-ship fleet from the Netherlands and 1,600 men under the command of Laurens Pit the Younger.
- September 9 – Francesco Invrea, King of Corsica, begins a two-year term as the Doge of the Republic of Genoa in Italy, succeeding Giovanni Battista Cattaneo Della Volta.
- September 10 – France begins the siege of the Spanish Netherlands (now Belgium) fort of Charleroi.
- September 14 – King Louis XIV of France sends a letter to Pope Innocent XII announcing the rescission of the Declaration of the Clergy of France issued in 1682.
- September 23 – Manuel Afonso Nzinga a Nlenke, ruling as King Manuel I of the Kingdom of Kongo (in present-day northern Angola) is executed on orders of the new king, Álvaro X.

=== October–December ===
- October – William Congreve's comedy The Double-Dealer is first performed in London.
- October 4 – Battle of Marsaglia near Turin in the Duchy of Savoy: A French force under the command of General Nicolas Catinat defeats the Savoyard forces, leaving 10,000 dead or wounded, while sustaining only 1,000 casualties.
- October 11 – Charleroi falls to French forces.
- October 29 – The Great Storm changes the course of rivers and alters the coastline from Virginia to Long Island in America.
- November 7 – King Charles II of Spain issues a royal edict providing sanctuary in Spanish Florida for escaped slaves from the English colony of South Carolina.
- November 14 – General Santaji Ghorpade of the Maratha Empire in India is defeated by General Himmat Khan of the Mughal Empire near Vikramhalli, and retreats. A week later, after regrouping his troops, Santaji defeats Himmat at their next encounter.
- November 21 – The 46-gun Royal Navy frigate HMS Mordaunt founders off of the coast of Cuba.
- November 29 – A fleet of 30 English and Dutch ships captures the French port of Saint-Malo
- December 16 – Diego de Vargas, Spanish colonial governor of Santa Fe de Nuevo México (now the area around the capital of the U.S. state of New Mexico), returns to the walled city of Santa Fe and requests the Pueblo people to accept the authority of the colonial government. Negotiations fail and a siege begins on December 29. The Pueblo defenders surrender the next day and the 70 rebels are executed soon after. The 400 civilian women and children are made slaves and distributed to the Spanish colonists.
- December 27 – The new 80-gun English Navy warship HMS Sussex departs Portsmouth on its maiden voyage, escorting a fleet of 48 warships and 166 merchant ships to the Mediterranean Sea. The fleet runs into a storm on February 27, 1694, and on March 1, Sussex and 12 other warships sink, along with a cargo of gold.

=== Date unknown ===
- China concentrates all its foreign trade on Canton; European ships are forbidden to land anywhere else.
- A religious schism takes place in Switzerland, within a group of Swiss and Alsatian Anabaptists led by Jakob Ammann. Those who follow Ammann become the Mennonite Amish sect.
- The Knights of the Apocalypse are formed in Italy.
- The Academia Operosorum Labacensium is established in Ljubljana, Slovenia.
- Financier Richard Hoare relocates Hoare's Bank (founded 1672) from Cheapside to Fleet Street in London.
- Italian barber Giovanni Paolo Feminis creates a perfume water called Aqua Admirabilis, earliest known form of eau de Cologne.
- John Locke publishes his influential book Some Thoughts Concerning Education.
- William Penn publishes his proposal for European federation, Essay on the Present and Future Peace of Europe.
- English astronomer Edmond Halley studies records of births and deaths in Breslau (Poland), producing a life table consolidating year of birth and age at death. He uses this to work out the price of life annuities.
- Dimitrie Cantemir presents his Kitâbu 'İlmi'l-Mûsiki alâ Vechi'l-Hurûfât (The Book of the Science of Music through Letters) to Sultan Ahmed II, which deals with melodic and rhythmic structure and practice of Ottoman music, and contains the scores for around 350 works composed during and before his own time, in an alphabetical notation system he invented.

== Births ==
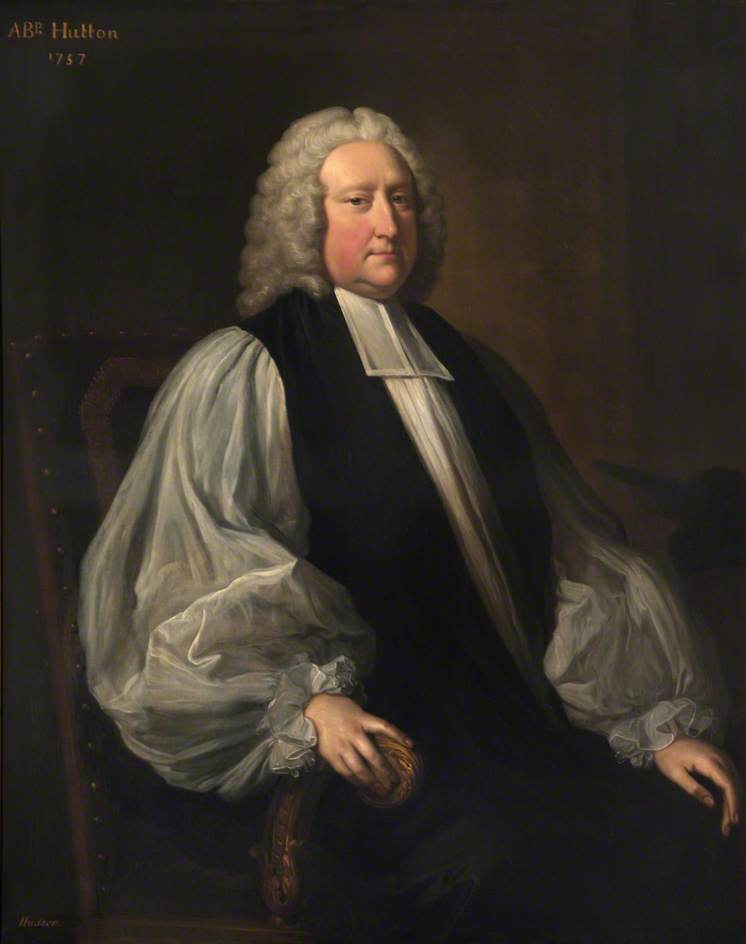
Matthew Hutton (archbishop of Canterbury) born 3 January

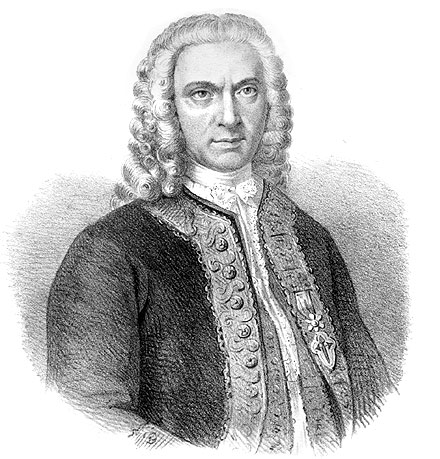
José del Campillo born 13 February

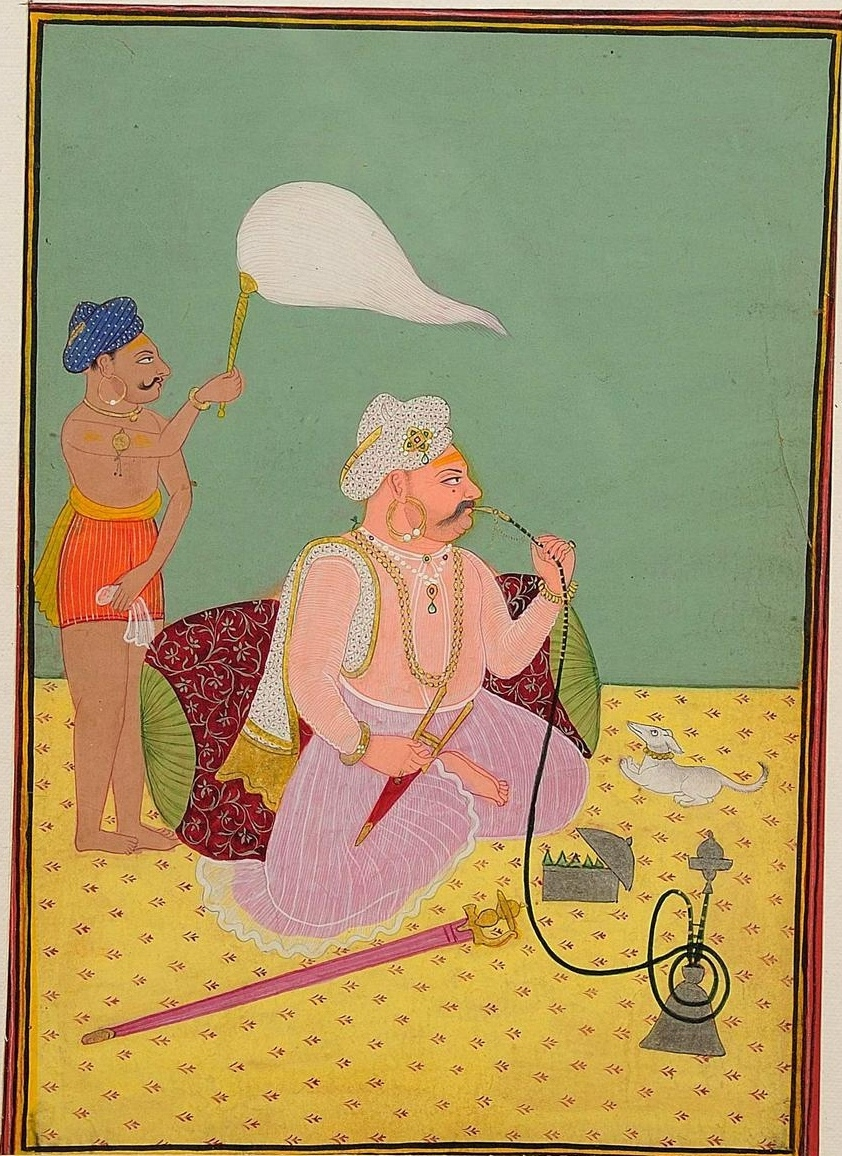
Malhar Rao Holkar born 16 March

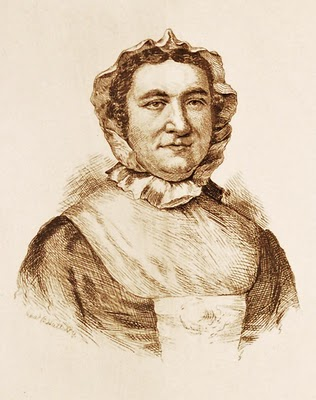
Mary Alexander born 16 April

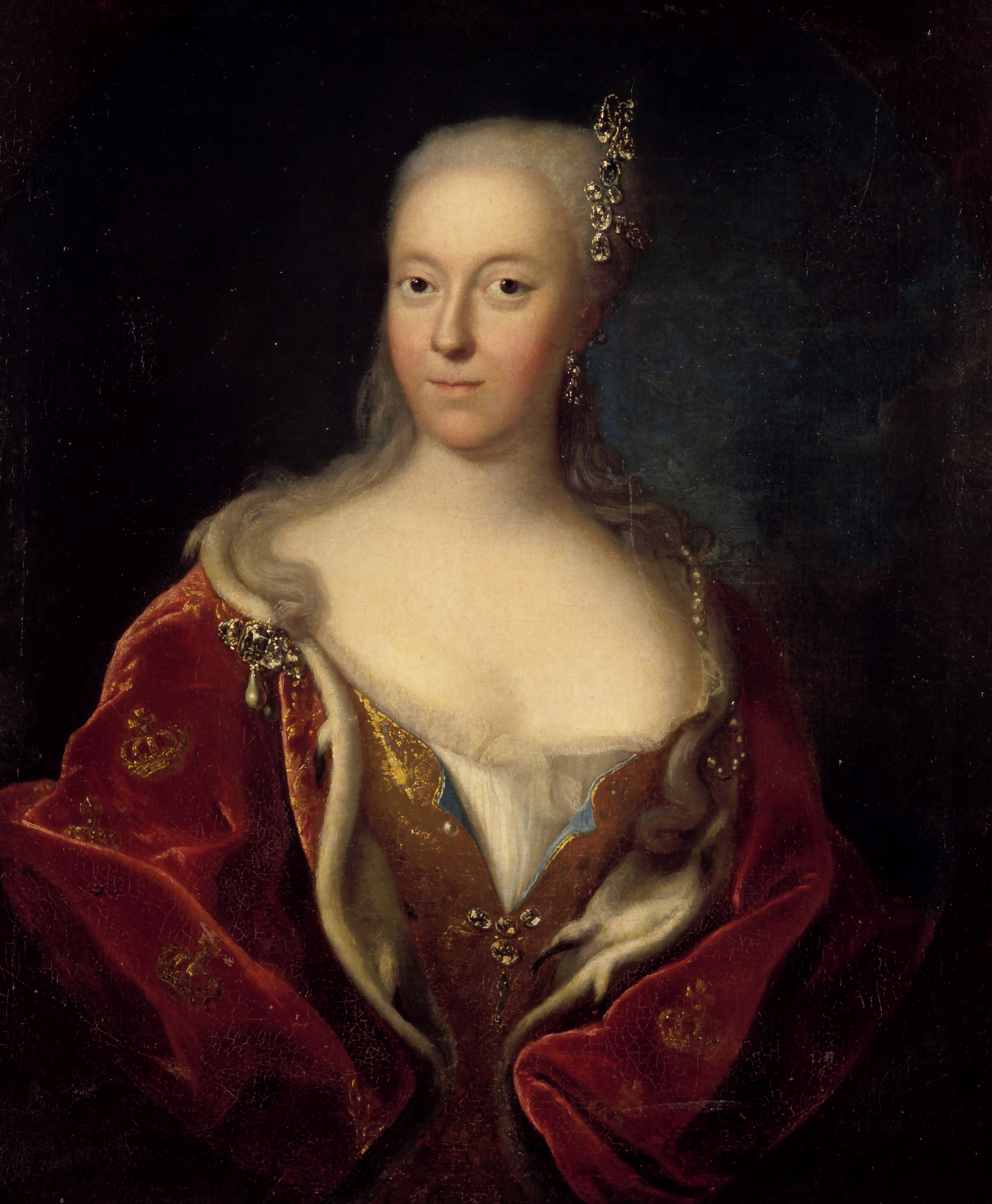
Anne Sophie Reventlow born 16 April

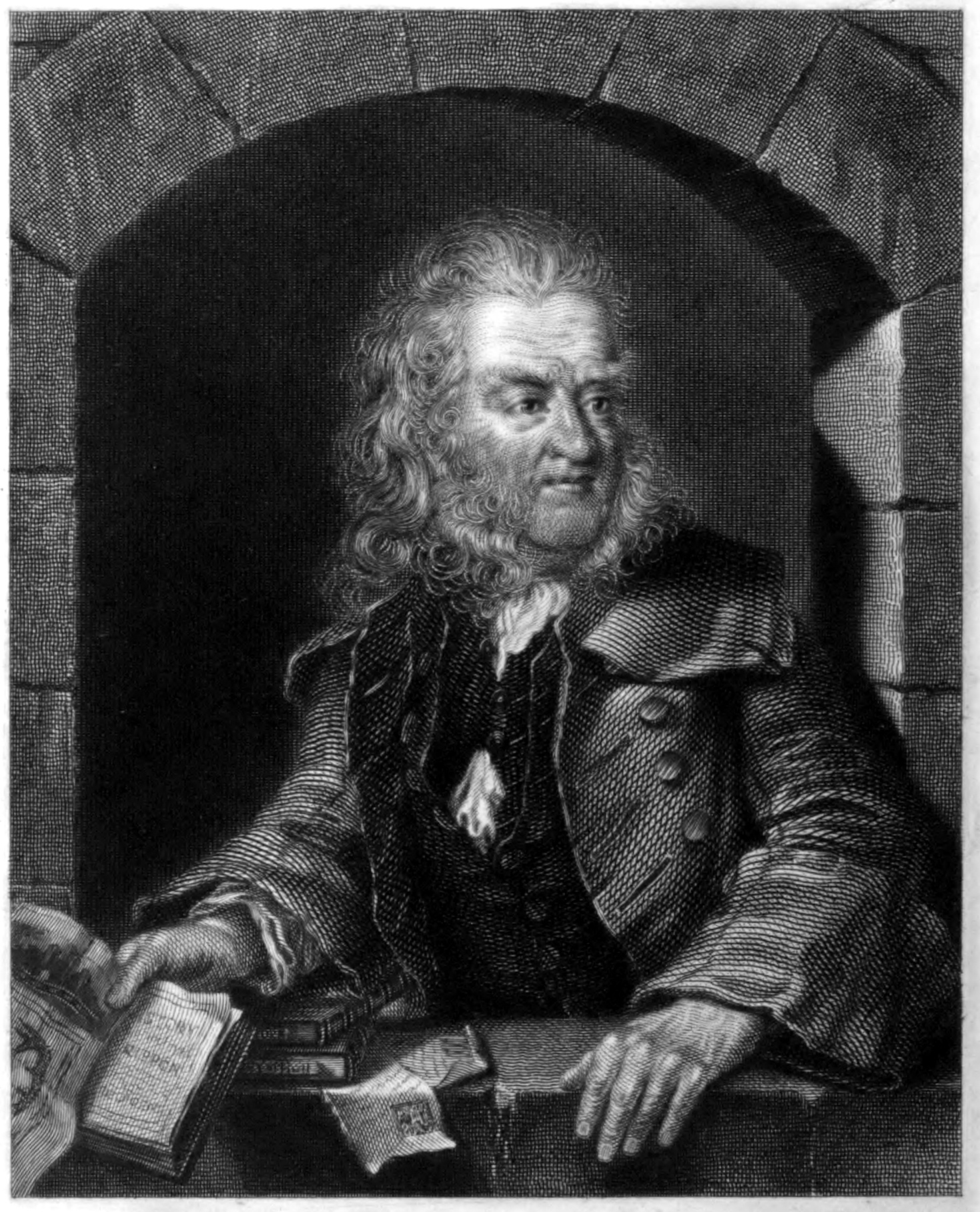
Thomas Gent born 4 May

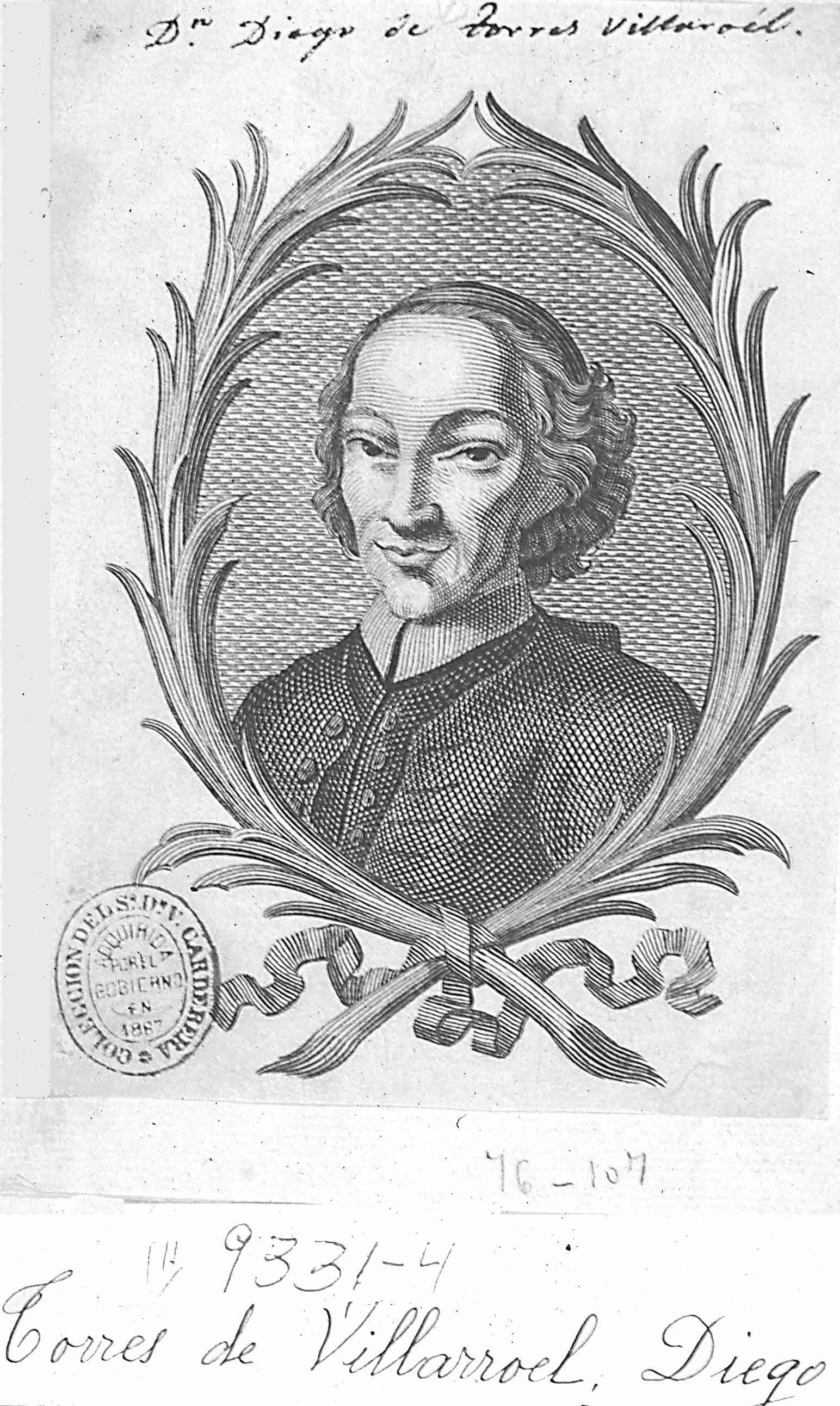
Diego de Torres Villarroel born 17 June

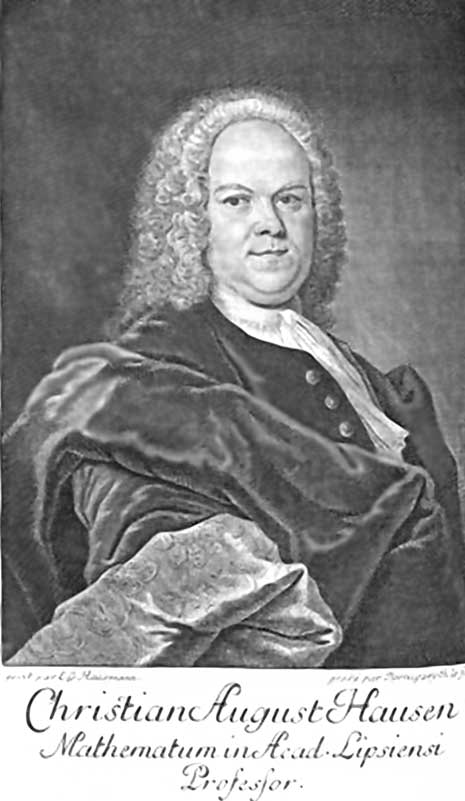
Christian August Hausen born 19 June

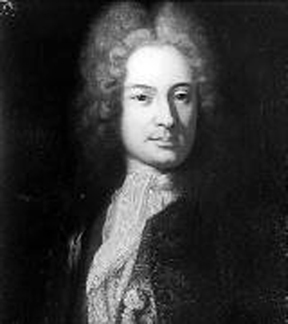
Joseph Emanuel Fischer von Erlach born 13 September

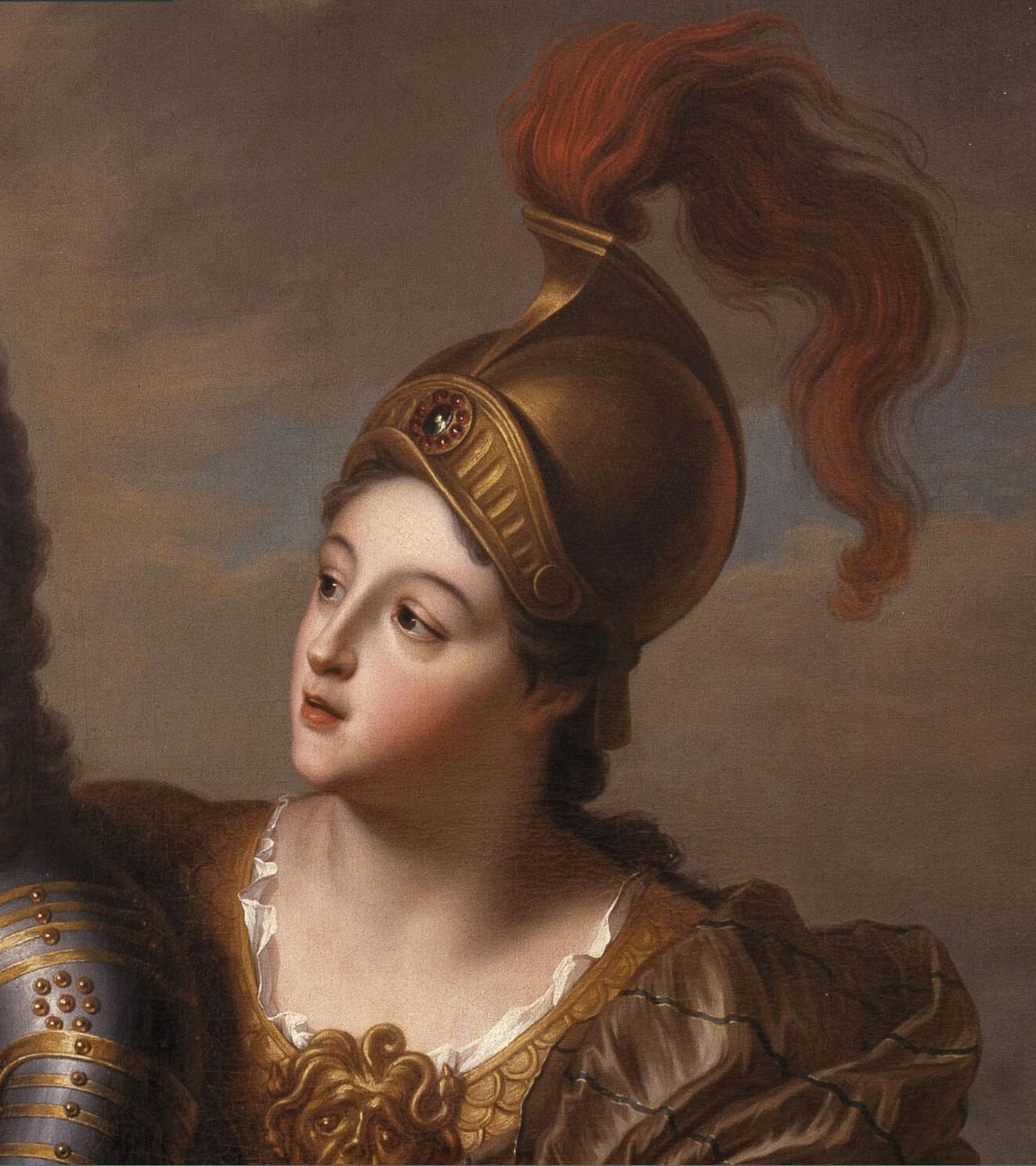
Marie-Madeleine de Parabère born 6 October

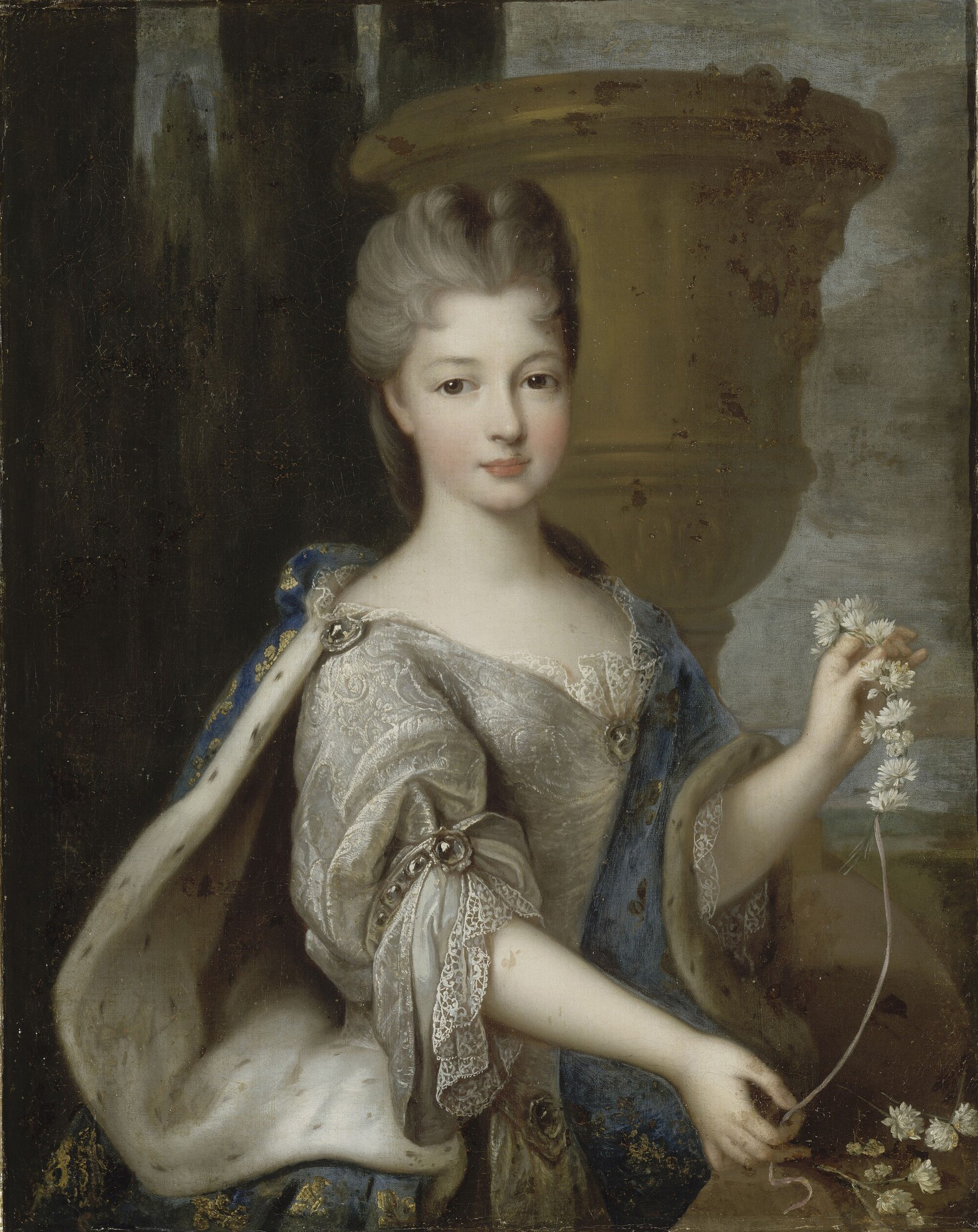
Louise Élisabeth de Bourbon born 22 November

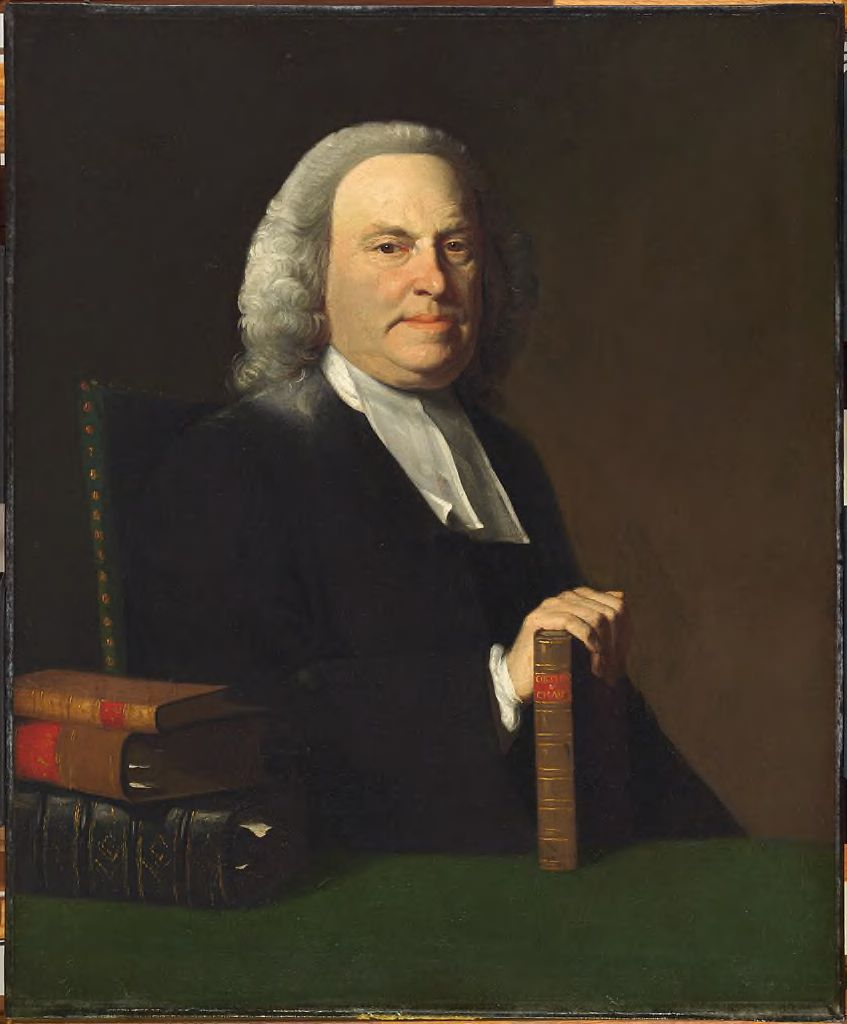
Nathaniel Appleton born 9 December

=== January–March ===
- January 1 – Francesco Carlo Rusca, Swiss painter (d. 1769)
- January 3
  - Giovanni Bianchi, Italian physician and zoologist (d. 1775)
  - Matthew Hutton, Archbishop of York and Archbishop of Canterbury (d. 1758)
- January 12 – Queen Jeongseong, Queen Consort of Korea (d. 1757)
- January 16 – Francesco Campora, Italian painter (d. 1763)
- January 17 – Melchor de Navarrete, Spanish colonial governor of Florida and Mexico (d. 1761)
- January 19
  - Jonathan Rashleigh, politician (d. 1764)
  - Hyacinthe Collin de Vermont, French painter (d. 1761)
- January 23 – Georg Bernhard Bilfinger, German mathematician (d. 1750)
- January 26 – William Robinson, deputy governor of the Colony of Rhode Island and Providence Plantations (d. 1751)
- January 28
  - Robert Sawyer Herbert, British Member of Parliament (d. 1769)
  - Empress Anna of Russia, Empress of Russia (d. 1740)
  - Gregor Werner, Austrian composer (d. 1766)
- January 29 – Henry Herbert, 9th Earl of Pembroke, English peer and architect (d. 1750)
- January 30 – Countess Palatine Maria Anna of Neuburg, Countess Palatine of Neuburg by birth, Duchess of Bavaria (d. 1751)
- February 12 – Avdotya Chernysheva, Russian lady-in-waiting (d. 1747)
- February 13 – José del Campillo, Spanish politician (d. 1743)
- February 15 – Peter Schenk the Younger, German engraver and map publisher (d. 1775)
- February 24
  - James Quin, English actor (d. 1766)
  - Johann Jacob Rambach, German theologian (d. 1735)
- March 2 – Sir Thomas Wheate, 2nd Baronet, English politician (d. 1746)
- March 5 – Johann Jakob Wettstein, Swiss theologian (d. 1754)
- March 6 – Edward Willes, English Anglican bishop and cryptanalyst (d. 1773)
- March 7 – Pope Clement XIII, pope of the Catholic Church (d. 1769)
- March 15 – Sir William Heathcote, 1st Baronet, British politician (d. 1751)
- March 16 – Malhar Rao Holkar, Indian nobleman (d. 1766)
- March 17 – Countess Palatine Elisabeth Auguste Sofie of Neuburg, Grandmother of Maximilian I Joseph of Bavaria (d. 1728)

=== April–June ===
- April 1 – Melusina von der Schulenburg, Countess of Walsingham, British Countess (d. 1778)
- April 3
  - George Edwards, English naturalist (d. 1773)
  - John Harrison, English clockmaker, horologist and inventor of the marine chronometer (d. 1776)
- April 4 – John West, 1st Earl De La Warr, British general (d. 1766)
- April 13 – Johann Georg Keyßler, German polymath (d. 1743)
- April 16
  - Mary Alexander, British American merchant (d. 1760)
  - Anne Sophie Reventlow, Danish royal consort, Queen of Denmark-Norway (d. 1743)
- April 20 – Daniel Brodhead II, American justice of the peace (d. 1755)
- April 25 – Sir Charles Hotham, 5th Baronet, British diplomat (d. 1738)
- April 26 – William Wollaston, British politician (d. 1757)
- April 29 – Asmus Ehrenreich von Bredow (d. 1756)
- April 30 – Giuseppe Maria Feroni, Italian cardinal (d. 1767)
- May 4 – Thomas Gent, Irish printer and writer (d. 1778)
- May 9 – Charles Howard, 7th Earl of Suffolk, English Earl (d. 1722)
- May 10
  - John Fox, English biographer (d. 1763)
  - Henry Hare, 3rd Baron Coleraine, Irish peer and politician (d. 1749)
- May 15 – Henry Winder, English chronologist (d. 1752)
- May 24 – Georg Rafael Donner, Austrian sculptor (d. 1741)
- May 31 – Bartolomeo Nazari, Italian painter (d. 1758)
- June 1
  - Alexey Bestuzhev-Ryumin, Russian diplomat, chancellor of the Russian Empire (d. 1768)
  - Johann Dietrich von Hülsen, German canon (d. 1767)
- June 17
  - Prince Charles William of Hesse-Darmstadt, Prince of Hesse-Darmstadt and Obrist (d. 1707)
  - Diego de Torres Villarroel, Spanish writer (d. 1770)
  - Johann Georg Walch, German theologian (d. 1775)
- June 19 – Christian August Hausen, German mathematician and physicist (d. 1743)
- June 20 – Wilhelmina Maria Frederica of Rochlitz, Polish noble (d. 1729)
- June 29 – Juan Bautista de Anza I, Spanish militar and explorer (d. 1740)

=== July–September ===
- July 7 – Gilles-François de Beauvais, French Jesuit (d. 1773)
- July 12 – Jean-Baptiste de Brancas, Roman Catholic archbishop (d. 1770)
- July 16 – Cecilia Rosa de Jesús Talangpaz, Servant of God (d. 1731)
- July 17 – Gerard Melder, miniature and watercolor painter from the Northern Netherlands (d. 1754)
- July 21 – Thomas Pelham-Holles, 1st Duke of Newcastle, Prime Minister of Great Britain (d. 1768)
- July 26 – Alexandre Le Riche de La Poupelinière, Patron of music and literature (d. 1762)
- August 1 – Hugh Hughes, Welsh poet (d. 1776)
- August 7
  - Sir Edmund Bacon, 5th Baronet, British politician (d. 1738)
  - Charles, Prince of Rochefort, French noble (d. 1763)
- August 8 – Laurent Belissen, French composer (d. 1762)
- August 9
  - Anne Cecil, Countess of Salisbury, British noble (d. 1757)
  - Princess Sophia Wilhelmina of Saxe-Coburg-Saalfeld, Princess of Saxe-Coburg-Saalfeld by birth and by marriage Princess of Schwarzburg-Rudolstadt (d. 1727)
- August 11 – Francisco de Merlo, Spanish noblemen, military and notary (d. 1758)
- August 13 – Gustavus Handcock, Irish politician (d. 1751)
- September 3 – Charles Radclyffe, Titular 5th Earl of Derwentwater (d. 1746)
- September 7 – Victor I, Prince of Anhalt-Bernburg-Schaumburg-Hoym (d. 1772)
- September 9 – Quinault-Dufresne, French actor (d. 1767)
- September 10 – James MacSparran, Church of England clergyman in America (d. 1757)
- September 13 – Joseph Emanuel Fischer von Erlach, Austrian architect (d. 1742)
- September 19 – Louis Charles Armand Fouquet, French general and diplomat (d. 1747)
- September 21 – Thomas Secker, Archbishop of Canterbury (d. 1768)
- September 22 – Simon Nikolaus Euseb von Montjoye-Hirsingen, Prince Bishop of Basel (d. 1775)

=== October–December ===
- October 3 – Conway Blennerhassett, Irish politician (d. 1724)
- October 5 – Johann Christian Buxbaum, German physician, botanist and traveller (d. 1730)
- October 6 – Marie-Madeleine de Parabère, French aristocrat (d. 1755)
- October 9 – Johann Lorenz von Mosheim, German church historian (d. 1755)
- October 11
  - Frederick Charles, Prince of Stolberg-Gedern (d. 1767)
  - John Hobart, 1st Earl of Buckinghamshire, British politician (d. 1756)
- October 14 – Daniel Maichel, German philosopher (d. 1752)
- October 15 – Sir Edward Wilmot, 1st Baronet, Royal surgeon (d. 1786)
- October 18
  - John Chandler, American judge and sheriff (d. 1762)
  - John Gilbert, Archbishop of York (d. 1761)
  - Jeremiah Markland, British classical scholar (d. 1776)
- October 20 – Gideon Wanton, Rhode Island colonial governor (d. 1767)
- October 21
  - Adriaan van der Burg, painter from the Northern Netherlands (d. 1733)
  - Frederik Nannestad, Norwegian bishop (d. 1774)
- October 22 – Thomas Fairfax, 6th Lord Fairfax of Cameron, American planter (d. 1781)
- October 25 – Antoine Ferrein, French anatomist (d. 1769)
- October 28 – Šimon Brixi, Czech composer (d. 1735)
- October 30 – Samuel Chew, American judge (d. 1743)
- November 5 – Ivan Neplyuyev, Russian noble (d. 1773)
- November 9 – Countess Henriette Charlotte of Nassau-Idstein, German princess (d. 1734)
- November 10 – Roland-Michel Barrin de La Galissonière, French admiral (d. 1756)
- November 13 – Thomas Watson-Wentworth, 1st Marquess of Rockingham, British politician (d. 1750)
- November 22
  - Louise Élisabeth de Bourbon, daughter of Louis (d. 1775)
  - Zheng Xie, Chinese painter (d. 1766)
- November 28 – Anthonie van der Heim, Dutch politician, urban magistrate and judge in Rotterdam, Grand Pensionary of Holland (d. 1746)
- November 30 – Christoph Förster, German composer (d. 1745)
- December 9 – Nathaniel Appleton, Congregational minister (d. 1784)
- December 29 – Pierre Joseph Céloron de Blainville, French explorer (d. 1759)
- date unknown – Heyat Mahmud, Bengali poet (d. 1760)

== Deaths ==
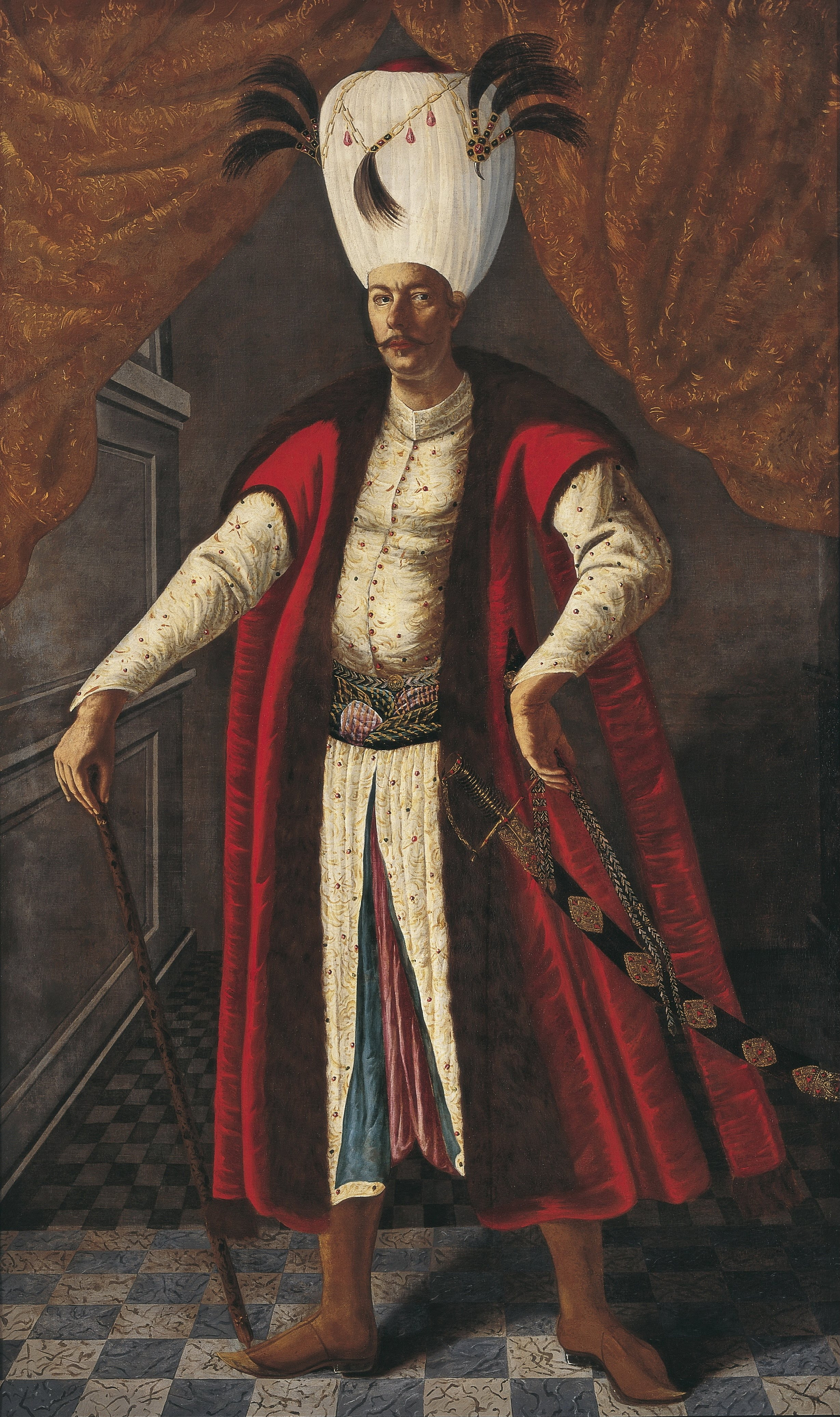
Mehmed IV died 6 January

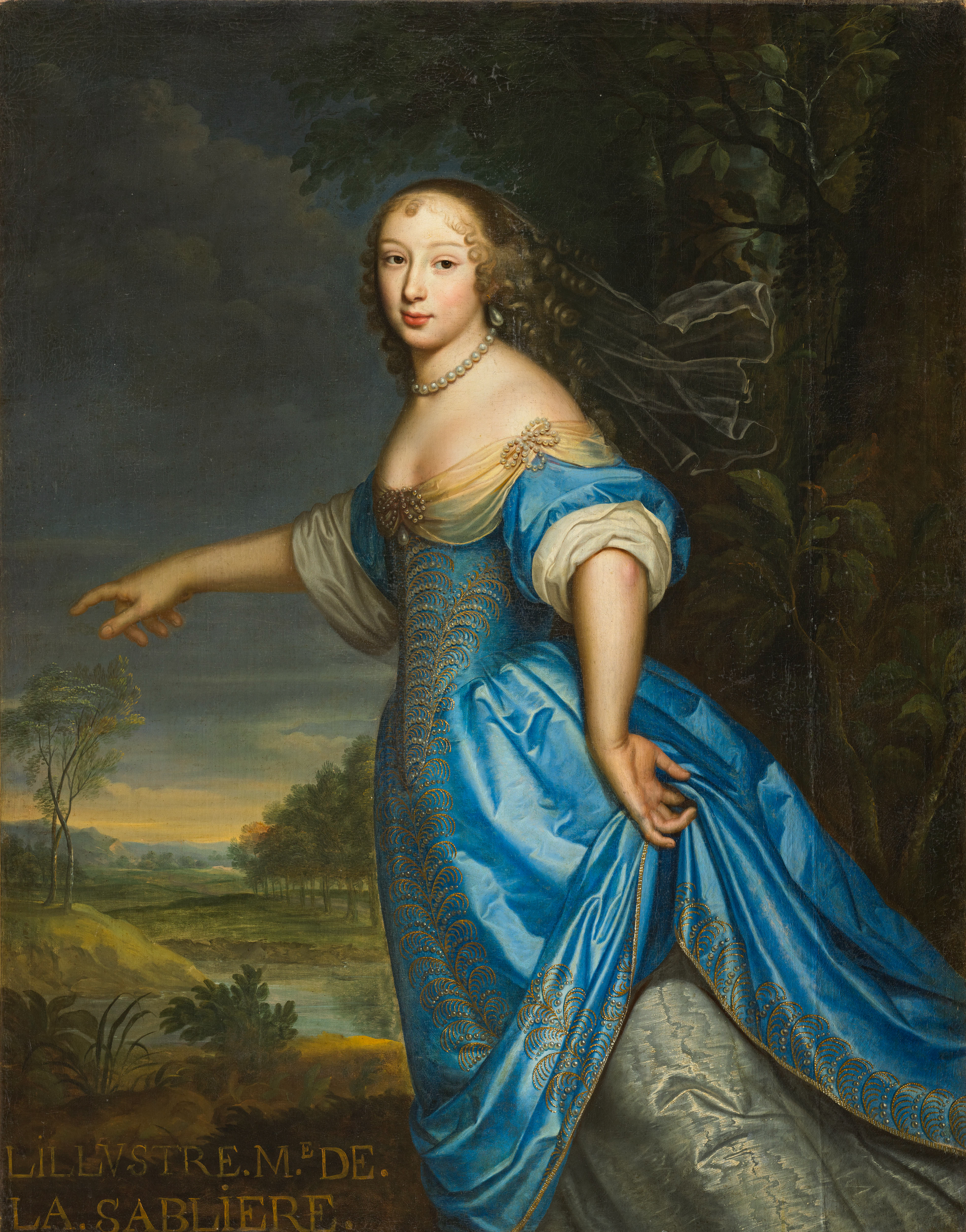
Marguerite de la Sablière died 6 January

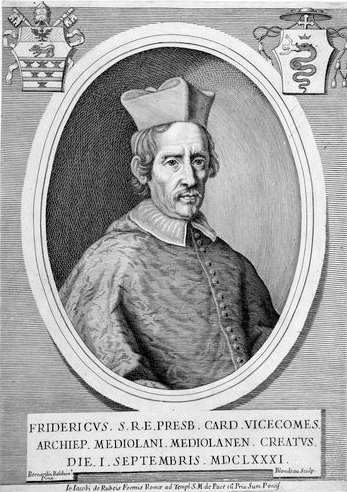
Federico Visconti died 7 January

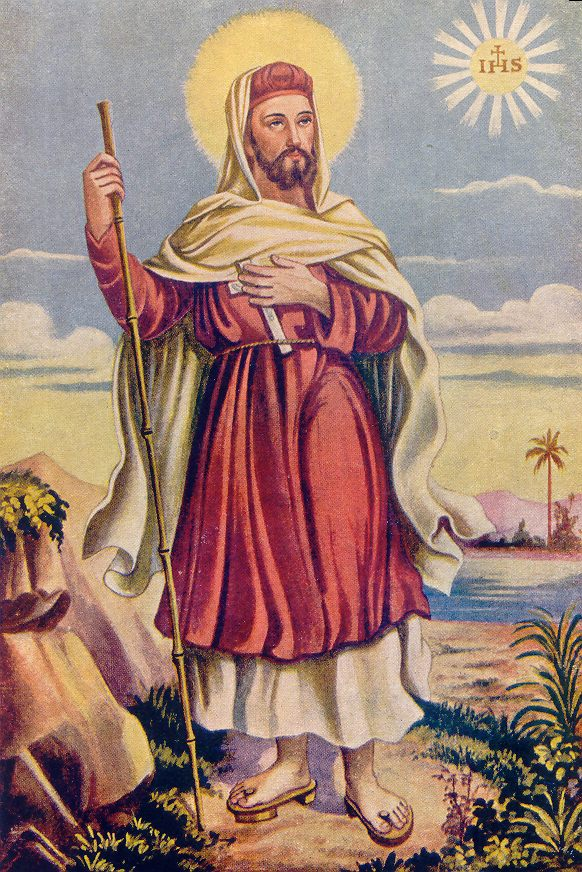
John de Britto died 4 February

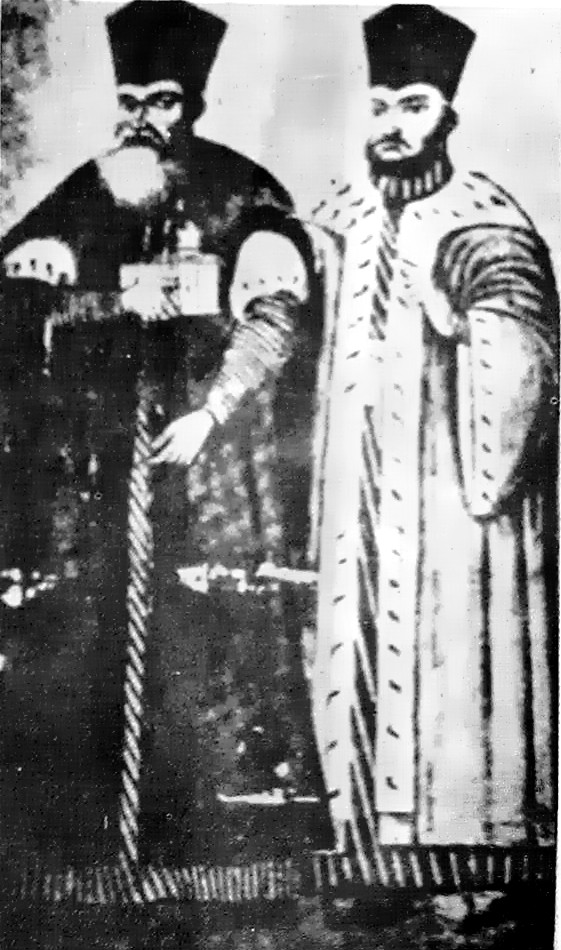
Constantin Cantemir died 24 March

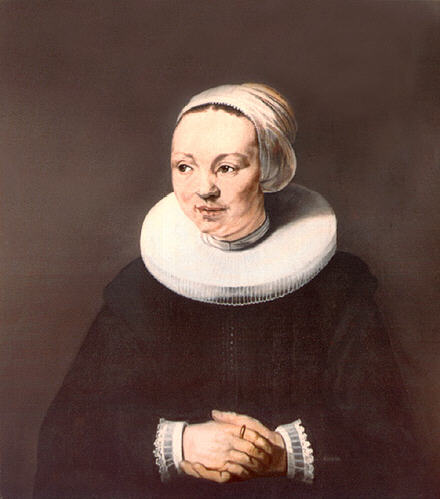
Adriaantje Hollaer died 31 March

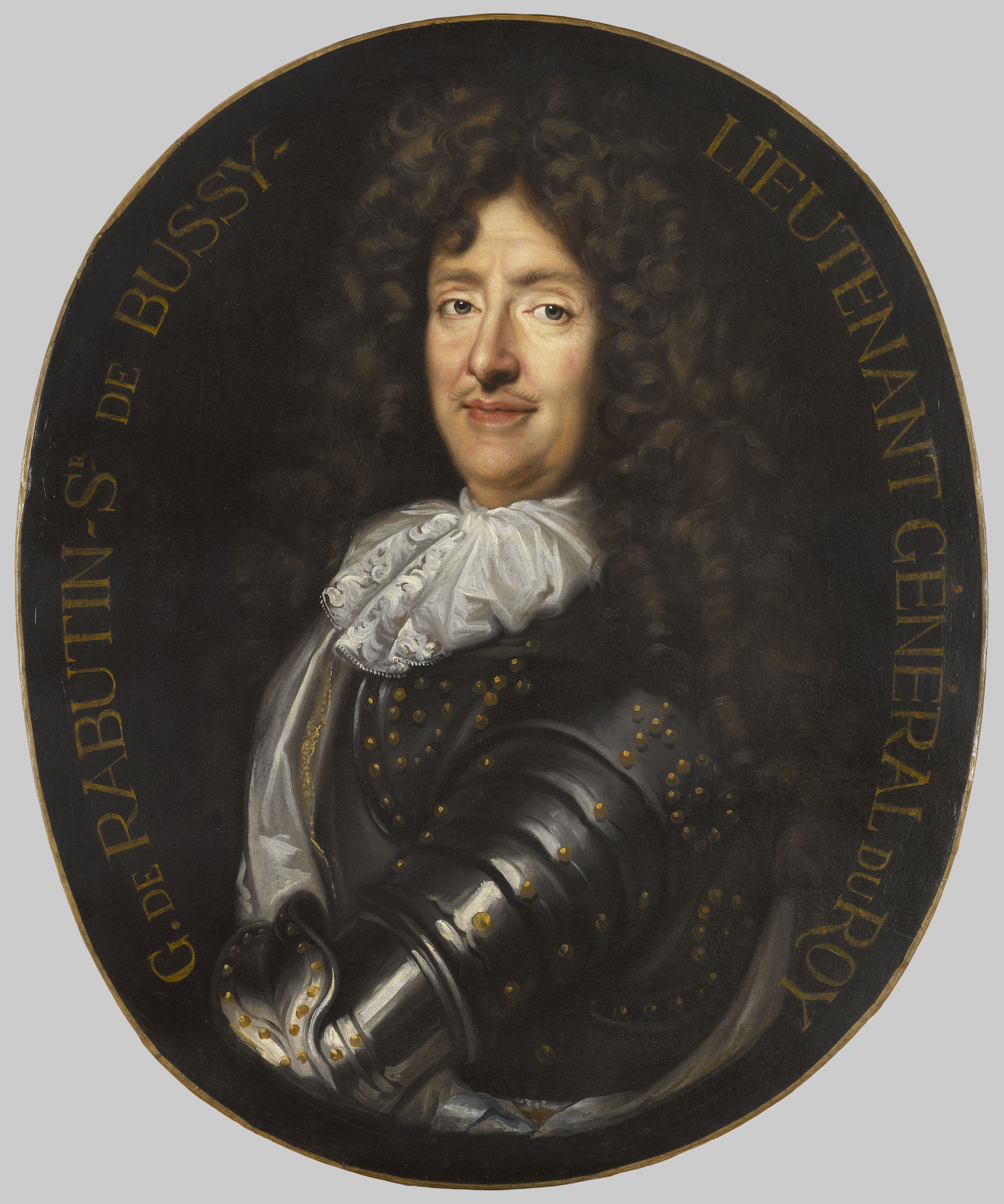
Roger de Rabutin, comte de Bussy died 9 April

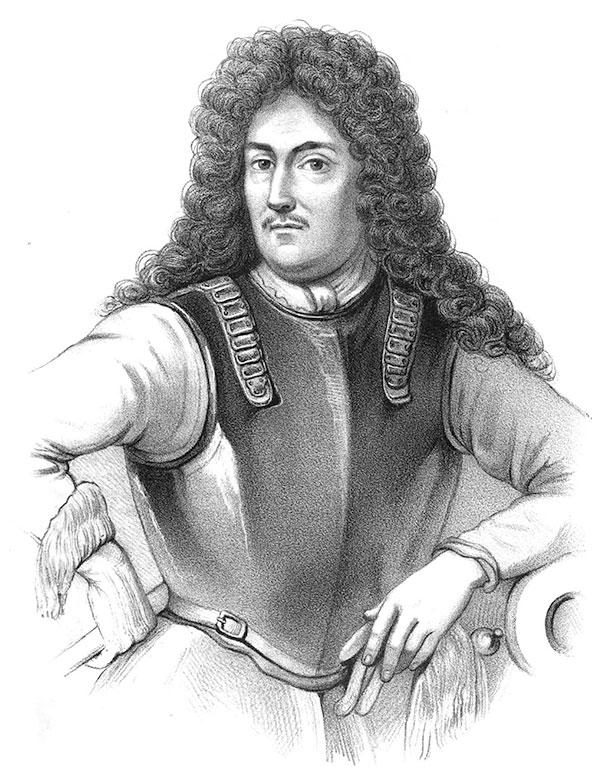
Rutger von Ascheberg died 17 April

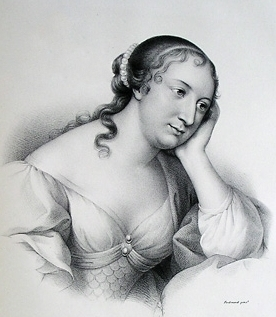
Madame de La Fayette died 25 May

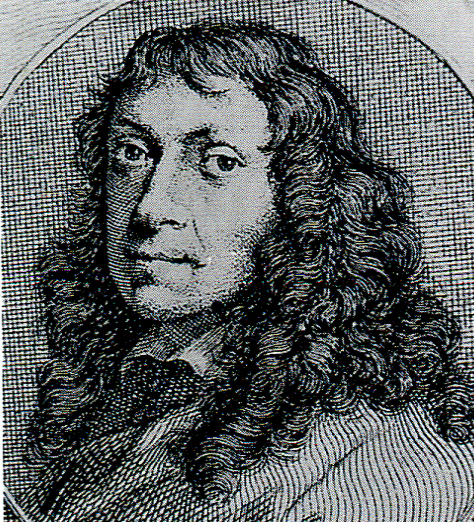
Willem Kalf died 31 July

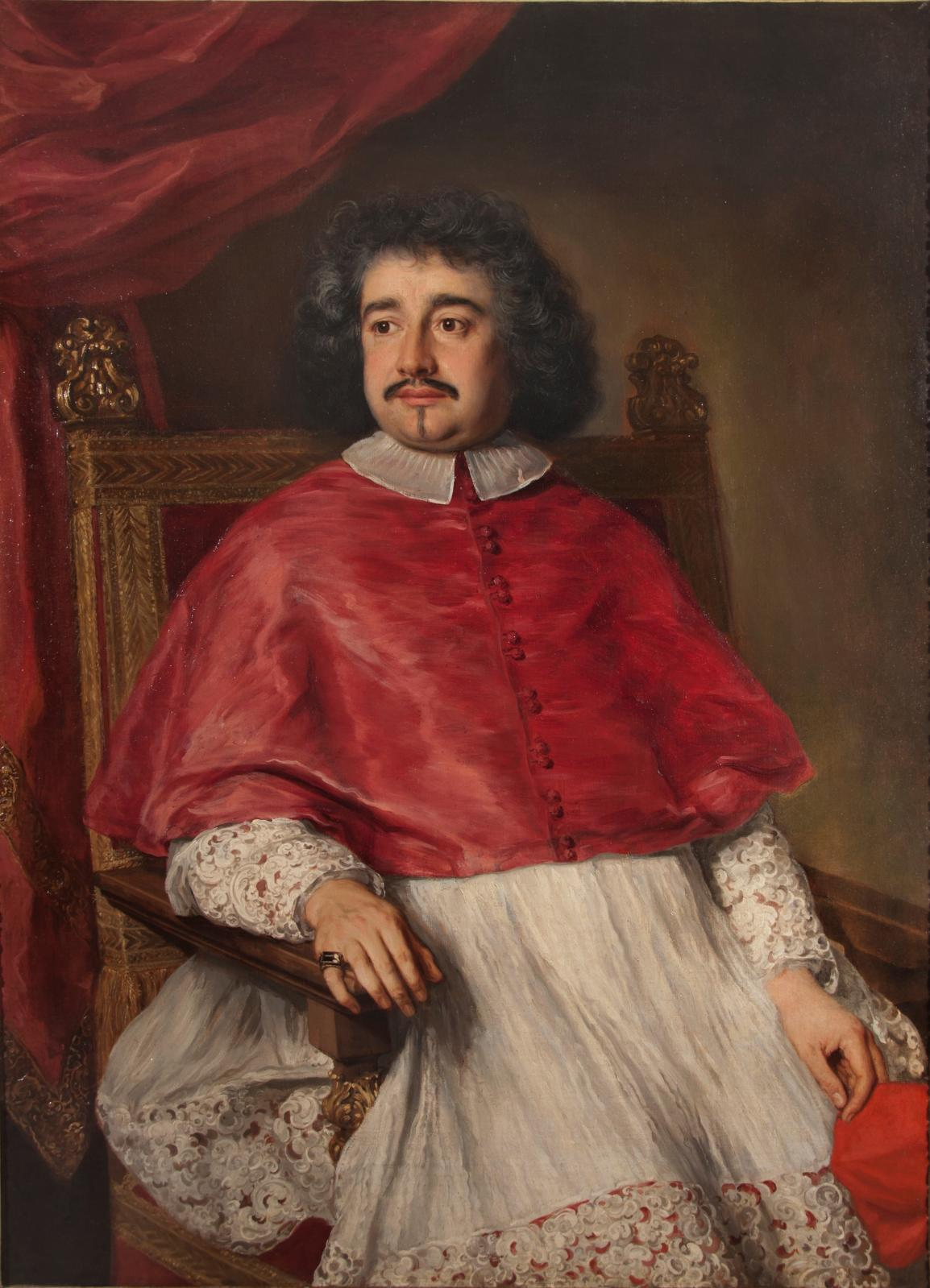
Flavio Chigi died 13 September

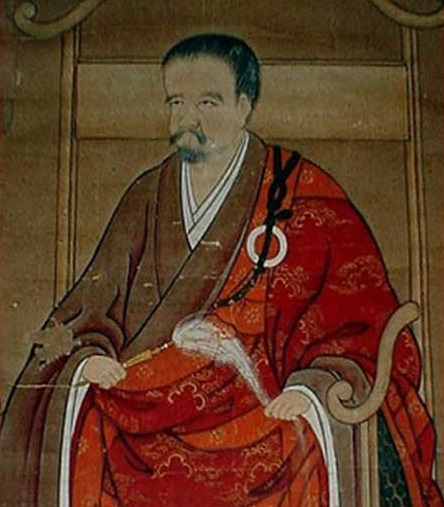
Bankei Yōtaku died 30 September

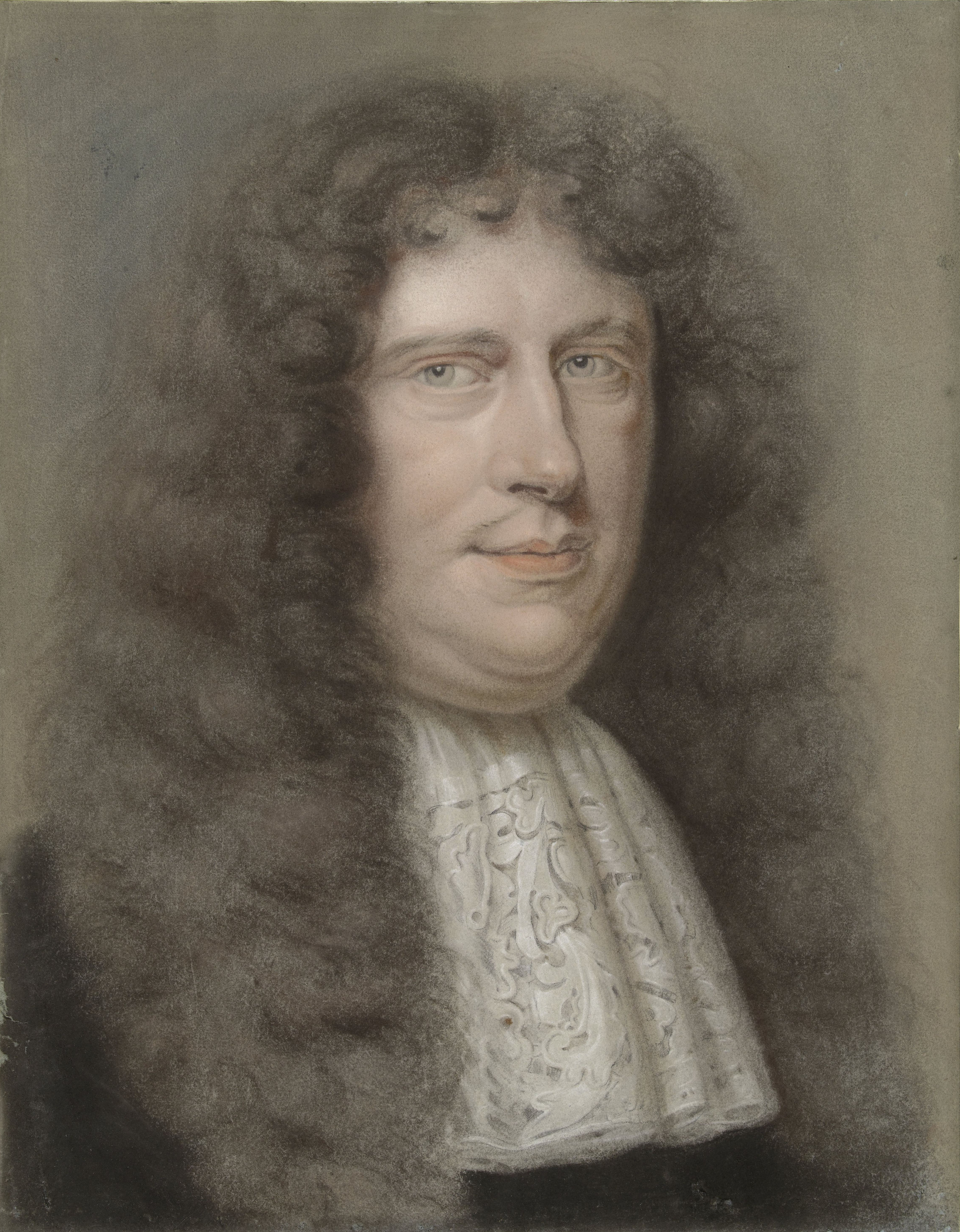
Theodor von Strattman died 25 October

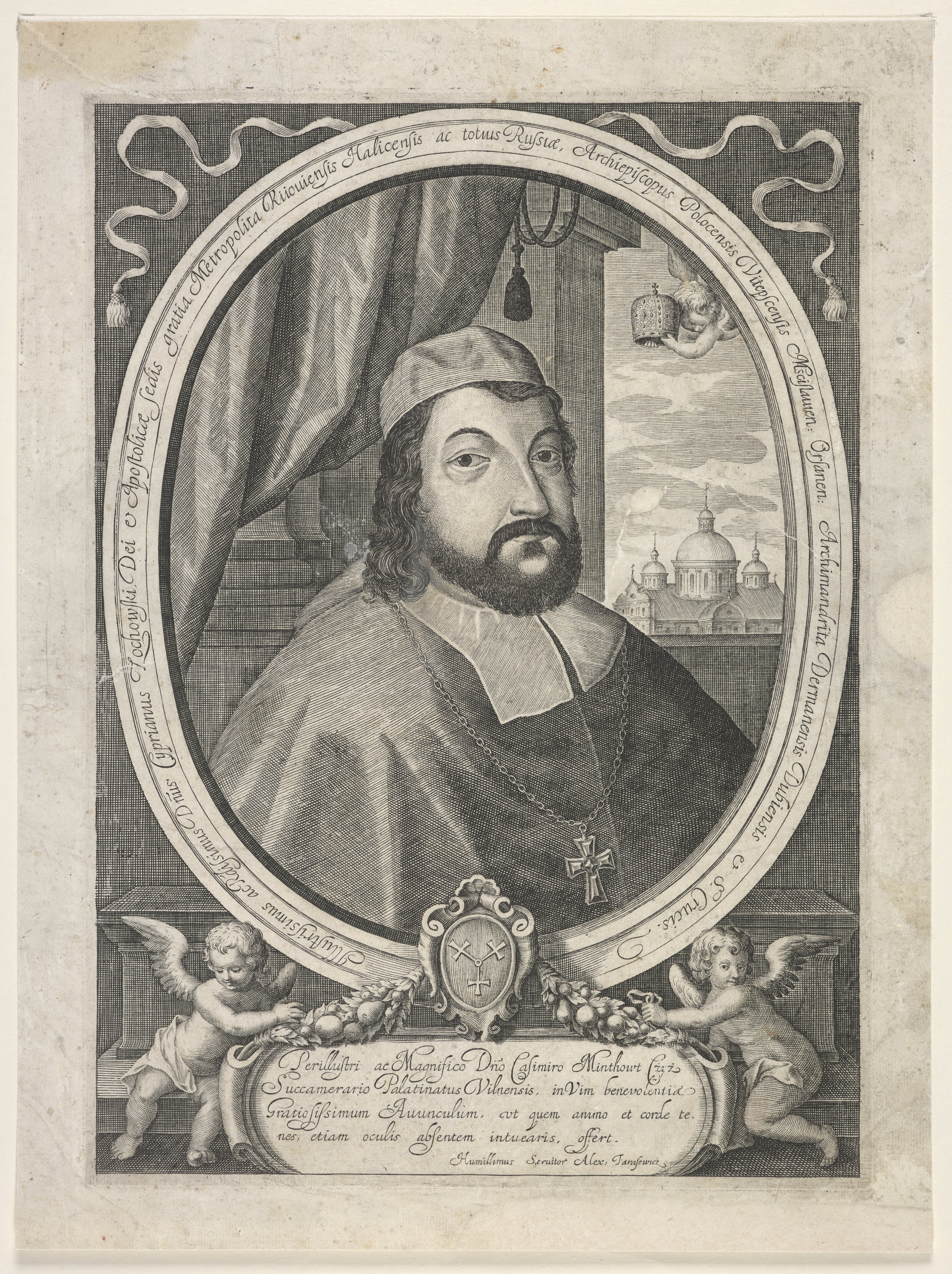
Kyprian Zochovskyj died 26 October

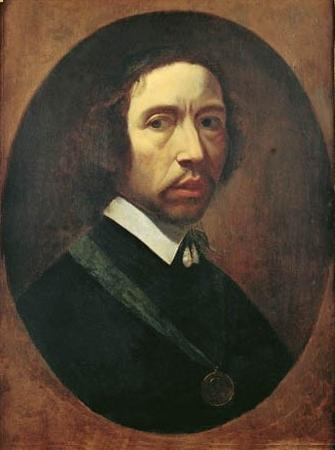
Job Adriaenszoon Berckheyde died 23 November

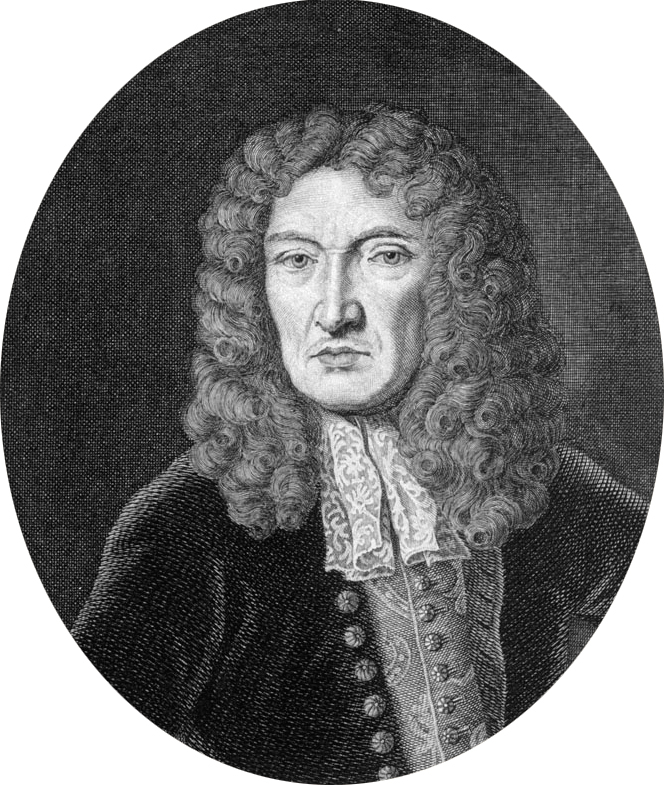
Willem van de Velde the Elder died 13 December

=== January–March ===
- January 1 – Theodor Undereyck, German theologian (b. 1635)
- January 4 – Thomas Hanford, first minister in Norwalk, Connecticut (b. 1621)
- January 6
  - Mehmed IV, Sultan of the Ottoman Empire from 1648 to 1687 (b. 1642)
  - Marguerite de la Sablière, French salonist and polymath (b. 1640)
- January 7
  - Marco Antonio Tomati, Roman Catholic bishop (b. 1583)
  - Federico Visconti, Cardinal Archbishop of Milan (b. 1617)
- January 8 – Jan Andrzej Morsztyn, Polish poet (b. 1621)
- January 21 – Honda Toshinaga, daimyo (b. 1635)
- January 27 – Anthony Lowther, English politician (b. 1641)
- January 31
  - Ahasuerus Fromanteel, English clockmaker (b. 1607)
  - Baptist Levinz, English bishop (b. 1644)
- February 4 – John de Britto, Portuguese Jesuit missionary and martyr (b. 1647)
- February 7 – Paul Pellisson, French writer (b. 1624)
- February 9 – William Turner, English Sheriff, Lord Mayor and M.P. of London (b. 1615)
- February 11 – John de Brito, Portuguese Jesuit missionary and martyr (b. 1647)
- February 13 – Johann Caspar Kerll, German composer and organist (b. 1627)
- February 18 – Elias Tillandz, Swedish physician, botanist, professor of medicine and university rector (Royal Academy of Turku) (b. 1640)
- February 21 – Pierre-Joseph-Marie Chaumonot, French missionary (b. 1611)
- February 22 – Henrik Horn, Swedish military leader and noble (b. 1618)
- February 24 – Filippo Alferio Ossorio, Catholic Bishop of Fondi (b. 1634)
- March 3 – William Stockdale, Member of Parliament (b. 1634)
- March 6 – Antonio Caraffa, Austrian Military commander (b. 1646)
- March 8 – Countess Palatine Leopoldine Eleonora of Neuburg (b. 1679)
- March 10 – Carlo Cesare Malvasia, Italian art historian (b. 1616)
- March 13 – John Rashleigh, English politician (b. 1619)
- March 17 – Richard Whithed, English politician (b. 1660)
- March 21 – Walter Chetwynd, English antiquary, politician (b. 1633)
- March 24 – Constantin Cantemir, Ruler of Moldavia (b. 1612)
- March 27 – Sylvanus Morgan, English painter (b. 1620)
- March 31 – Adriaantje Hollaer, Dutch painter (b. 1610)

=== April–June ===
- April 4
  - Isaac Aboab da Fonseca, Portuguese Sephardic rabbi (b. 1605)
  - Anne Palles, Danish witch (b. 1619)
- April 5
  - Philip William August, Count Palatine of Neuburg, Eighth son of Elector Palatine Philip William (b. 1668)
  - Anne Marie Louise d'Orléans, Duchess of Montpensier, French writer (b. 1627)
  - George Louis I, Count of Erbach-Erbach (b. 1643)
  - Christian Scriver, German hymnwriter (b. 1629)
- April 9 – Roger de Rabutin, comte de Bussy, French writer (b. 1618)
- April 15
  - Pierre Cureau de La Chambre, French priest (b. 1640)
  - Sir John Cutler, 1st Baronet, English merchant and financier (b. 1608)
- April 17 – Rutger von Ascheberg, Courland-born soldier in Swedish service (b. 1621)
- April 20 – Claudio Coello, Spanish Baroque painter (b. 1642)
- May 2 – Ernest, Landgrave of Hesse-Rheinfels and later of Hessen-Rheinfels-Rotenburg (b. 1623)
- May 3 – Claude de Rouvroy, duc de Saint-Simon, French courtier (b. 1607)
- May 6
  - François Tallemant the Elder, French translator (b. 1620)
  - William Yardley, Quaker minister (b. 1632)
- May 8 – Jan Verkolje, painter from the Northern Netherlands (b. 1650)
- May 13 – Thomas Jervoise, English politician (b. 1616)
- May 15
  - Jacques Du Frische, theologian (b. 1640)
  - John Hamilton, 2nd Lord Bargany, Scottish peer accused of treason and cleared of charges (b. 1640)
- May 16 – Philippe Couplet, Flemish Jesuit missionary (b. 1623)
- May 18 – Giacomo Altoviti, Italian religious (b. 1604)
- May 21 – Henry Erskine, 3rd Lord Cardross, Scottish nobleman and covenanter (b. 1650)
- May 25
  - Al-Hurr al-Amili, Muslim cleric and scholar (b. 1624)
  - Madame de La Fayette, French writer (b. 1634)
- May 27
  - Asano Mitsuakira (b. 1617)
  - John Spencer, English clergyman, scholar, Master of Corpus Christi College, Cambridge (b. 1630)
- June 3 – Camille de Neufville de Villeroy, Archbishop of Lyon (b. 1606)
- June 4 – John Wildman, English soldier and politician (b. 1621)
- June 6 – Dirck Ferreris, Dutch painter (b. 1634)
- June 7 – Miklós Erdődy, Ban of Croatia (b. 1630)
- June 12
  - John Ashby, Royal Navy admiral (b. 1646)
  - Christen Jensen Lodberg, Danish bishop (b. 1625)
- June 17 – Francisco Marcos de Velasco, Spanish military governor, commander of Antwerp Citadel (b. 1633)
- June 18 – Johann Heinrich von Anethan, German vicar general and canon (b. 1628)
- June 20 – Juliana of Hesse-Eschwege, German noblewoman (b. 1652)
- June 22 – Wolfgang Leinberer, German astronomer, philosopher, mathematician, professor, priest in the Society of Jesus (b. 1635)
- June 23 – Sir John Wittewrong, 1st Baronet, English parliamentarian (b. 1618)
- June 24
  - Sir Henry Lyttelton, 2nd Baronet, English politician (b. 1624)
  - Pavel Josef Vejvanovský, Czech composer (b. 1633)
  - Isaac Willaerts, painter from the Northern Netherlands (b. c. 1620)
- June 26 – John Philip II, Wild- and Rhinegrave of Salm-Dhaun (b. 1645)
- June 30 – Christina zu Mecklenburg, princess of Mecklenburg-Schwerin (b. 1639)

=== July–September ===
- July 4 – Ermanno Stroiffi, Italian painter (b. 1616)
- July 8 – François Duchesne, French historian (b. 1616)
- July 12
  - John Ashby, English admiral (b. c. 1640)
  - Johan Hadorph, Swedish director-general of the Central Board of National Antiquities (b. 1630)
- July 13
  - Cataldo Amodei, Sicilian composer (b. 1649)
  - Michiel Nouts, Dutch painter (b. 1628)
  - Johann Konrad von Roggenbach, Prince-Bishop of Basle (b. 1618)
- July 19 – Hendrik Trajectinus, Count of Solms, Dutch lieutenant-general (b. 1638)
- July 22 – John Davies, Welsh translator and writer (b. 1625)
- July 26 – Ulrika Eleonora of Denmark, Queen consort of Sweden (b. 1656)
- July 31 – Willem Kalf, painter from the Northern Netherlands (b. 1619)
- August 7 – John George II, Prince of Anhalt-Dessau (b. 1627)
- August 12 – Mark Sension, Connecticut settler (b. 1630)
- August 15 – Gregorio María de Silva y Mendoza, 9th Duke of the Infantado (b. 1649)
- August 21 – Patrick Sarsfield, 1st Earl of Lucan, Irish Jacobite peer (b. 1655)
- August 23 – Johann Daniel Major, German professor of theoretical medicine (b. 1634)
- August 27 – Edward Rawson, American settler (b. 1615)
- August 28
  - Johann Christoph Bach, German composer (b. 1645)
  - Jane Howard, Duchess of Norfolk, British noble (b. 1640)
- August 30 – Laurent Cassegrain, French priest, astronomer and physicist (b. 1629)
- September 1 – Nicolas Potier de Novion, French politician (b. 1618)
- September 5 – Otto Grote zu Schauen, German politician (b. 1636)
- September 6 – Odoardo Farnese, Hereditary Prince of Parma (b. 1666)
- September 9 – Ihara Saikaku, Japanese writer (b. 1642)
- September 12
  - Elisabeth Baulacre, Genevan industrialist (b. 1613)
  - Lionel Copley, Colonial governor of Maryland (b. 1648)
  - Gabrielle de Rochechouart de Mortemart, French noble (b. 1633)
- September 13
  - Lazar Baranovych, Ukrainian bishop (b. 1616)
  - Flavio Chigi, Italian cardinal and librarian (b. 1631)
- September 14 – Aert Jansse van Nes, Dutch admiral (b. 1626)
- September 16 – Giovanni Battista de Belli, Roman Catholic prelate, Bishop of Telese o Cerreto Sannita (b. 1630)
- September 19 – Johann Weikhard von Valvasor, Slovenian nobleman and polymath (b. 1641)
- September 24 – Henri Justel, French scholar, royal administrator, bibliophile and librarian (b. 1620)
- September 25 – William Bassett, English landowner and politician (b. 1628)
- September 27 – John Lovelace, 3rd Baron Lovelace, English politician (b. 1640)
- September 28
  - Pietro Antonio d'Alessandro, Roman Catholic bishop (b. 1628)
  - Thomas Knyvett, 7th Baron Berners, English politician (b. 1656)
- September 30 – Bankei Yōtaku, Japanese Zen buddhist monk (b. 1622)

=== October–December ===
- October 1 – Pedro Abarca, Spanish theologian (b. 1619)
- October 4 – Thomas Clayton, English politician (b. 1612)
- October 5 – George Lawton, American settler (b. 1607)
- October 8 – Thomas Bampfield, English politician (b. 1623)
- October 9
  - Marquard Sebastian Schenk von Stauffenberg, Prince-Bishop of Bamberg (b. 1644)
  - Unshō, Japanese Buddhist scriptural commentator (b. 1604)
- October 10 – Charles Patin, French physician (b. 1633)
- October 12 – Sir Christopher Conyers, 2nd Baronet, Conyers baronets and Lord Lieutenant of Durham (b. 1621)
- October 14 – Philipp Kilian, German engraver (b. 1628)
- October 17 – Charles Schomberg, 2nd Duke of Schomberg, English general (b. 1645)
- October 25 – Theodor von Strattman, Austrian diplomat (b. 1637)
- October 26
  - Coenraad van Beuningen, Dutch diplomat (b. 1622)
  - Kyprian Zochovskyj, Metropolitan of Kyiv (b. 1635)
- November 2 – Theodor Kerckring, Dutch anatomist (b. 1638)
- November 9 – Samuel Hale, Connecticut settler and politician (b. 1615)
- November 12 – Maria van Oosterwijck, Dutch Golden Age painter (b. 1623)
- November 13 – Francesco Fortezza, Roman Catholic bishop (b. 1621)
- November 16 – Francis Marsh, Irish bishop (b. 1626)
- November 23 – Job Adriaenszoon Berckheyde, Dutch painter (b. 1630)
- November 24 – William Sancroft, Archbishop of Canterbury (b. 1617)
- November 30 – Francesco Lorenzo Brancati di Lauria, Italian Catholic cardinal (b. 1612)
- December 5 – Levinus Bennet, English politician (b. 1631)
- December 12 – Countess Palatine Anna Magdalena of Birkenfeld-Bischweiler, Countess of Hanau-Lichtenberg (b. 1640)
- December 13
  - Dosoftei, Moldavian Metropolitan (b. 1624)
  - Willem van de Velde the Elder, Dutch painter (b. c. 1611)
- December 14 – Giuseppe Felice Tosi, Italian composer (b. 1619)
- December 16 – Jacques Rousseau, painter from France (b. 1630)
- December 21 – Hendrick Mommers, Dutch painter (b. 1623)
- December 22 – Elisabeth Hevelius, Danzig astronomer (b. 1647)
- December 24 – Nicolaes Maes, Dutch painter (b. 1634)
- December 27 – Henri de Villars, French prelate (b. 1621)
- December 29 – Vere Fane, 4th Earl of Westmorland, English Earl (b. 1644)
- date unknown – Lars Nilsson, Sami shaman in Sweden
