= Antoine Le Camus =

French physician and writer (1722–1772)

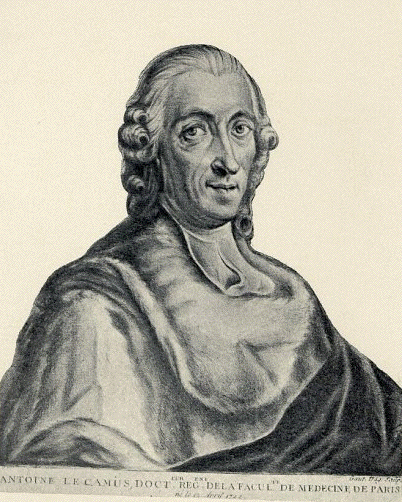
- Born: 12 April 1722; Paris, France
- Died: 2 January 1772 (aged 49) (Note: Date given by Bourru's eulogy and the Nouvelle Biographie générale; some modern sources give 3 January 1772.); Paris, France
- Resting place: Church of Saint-Séverin, Paris
- Education: Faculty of Medicine of Paris
- Occupations: Physician, writer, medical journalist
- Known for: Médecine de l'esprit (1753); Abdeker (1748)
- Relatives: Sébastien Vaillant (great-grandfather)

Antoine Le Camus (12 April 1722 – 2 January 1772) was a French physician, writer and medical journalist. A professor at the Faculty of Medicine of Paris, he is best known for Médecine de l'esprit (1753), an early attempt to explain the operations of the mind through their physical causes, and for Abdeker, a popular treatise on beauty presented as the translation of an Arabic manuscript, which appeared in English in 1754.

== Early life and education ==
Le Camus was born in Paris on 12 April 1722, the son of Nicolas Le Camus, major of the guards of the city of Paris, and Françoise Carbonnet. He was a great-grandson of the botanist Sébastien Vaillant.

He was educated at the Collège de Clermont, where his rhetoric teacher was the Jesuit Charles Porée, from whom he acquired a lasting taste for verse. He studied philosophy at the Collège d'Harcourt under the astronomer Pierre Charles Le Monnier. After becoming a master of arts in 1739, he studied medicine under Antoine Ferrein, became a bachelor of medicine in 1742 and received his doctorate on 2 October 1744. He celebrated the inauguration of the Faculty's renovated anatomy theatre with a Latin poem, Amphitheatrum medicum (1745), and defended two further theses in 1745 and 1746 to obtain the rank of docteur régent of the Faculty.

== Career ==
Le Camus combined a large private practice with teaching. He was appointed professor at the Faculty of Medicine in 1762, and from 1766 held its chair of surgery taught in French. He was a member of the academies of La Rochelle and Amiens, of the literary society of Châlons-sur-Marne, and an honorary associate of the Royal College of Physicians of Nancy (1768). In 1769 he stood unsuccessfully for Ferrein's former seat at the Academy of Sciences.

From 1753 to 1765 he wrote regularly for the Journal économique, contributing medical memoirs, monthly notes on the diseases prevailing in Paris, reviews of theses defended at the Faculty and notices of new medical books. Many of these pieces were collected in his Mémoires sur divers sujets de médecine (1760). In them he criticised reliance on authority in medicine, the overuse of drugs and the abuse of bloodletting, and encouraged mothers to breastfeed their children. His views on bloodletting led to his denunciation as an innovator at an assembly of physicians.

=== Smallpox inoculation ===
Le Camus was a committed advocate of smallpox inoculation. He published a Projet d'anéantir la petite vérole ("Plan to eradicate smallpox") in 1767, and in 1770 established an inoculation house at Grand-Charonne, then a village east of Paris. Local residents complained to the authorities as soon as the first inoculations took place in March 1771, and Le Camus was forced to give up the establishment at a financial loss.

== Médecine de l'esprit ==
In Médecine de l'esprit (2 vols., 1753), Le Camus set out to identify the bodily dispositions and physical causes that, through the union of soul and body, influence the operations of the mind, and to propose means of keeping these operations in good order or correcting them when disordered. In his preface he rejected in advance any charge of materialism, affirming the spirituality of the soul and the existence of God. The Jesuit Mémoires de Trévoux accepted this profession of faith but observed in June 1753 that he followed the ideas of John Locke too closely. In 1756 the critic Élie Fréron, in a dispute over a bibliography he wrongly attributed to Le Camus, dismissed the book as a "grotesque production". A second edition appeared in 1769, dedicated to the Marquis de Paulmy.

Historians of science have since discussed the work as part of the eighteenth-century medical literature on sensibility and the relationship between body and mind.

== Abdeker ==
Abdeker, ou l'art de conserver la beauté (1748) is a work of fiction combined with practical advice on cosmetics and the care of the body, presented as the translation of an Arabic manuscript supposedly brought to Paris in 1740 by the physician of the Ottoman ambassador. It went through several French editions and was translated into English as Abdeker: or, the Art of Preserving Beauty (London: A. Millar, 1754), with a Dublin edition in 1756. The book is still cited by historians of cosmetics and of the body.

== Death ==
Le Camus fell ill in mid-1771, at first refusing all treatment, and died in Paris on 2 January 1772. He never married. He was buried in the church of Saint-Séverin. His colleague Edme-Claude Bourru published a eulogy of him in the second volume of his posthumous Médecine pratique.

== Selected works ==
- Amphitheatrum medicum (1745), Latin poem
- Abdeker, ou l'art de conserver la beauté (1748)
  - English translation: Abdeker: or, the Art of Preserving Beauty. Translated from an Arabic Manuscript. London: A. Millar, 1754.
- Médecine de l'esprit (1753; 2nd ed. 1769), 2 vols.
- Mémoires sur divers sujets de médecine (1760)
- Projet d'anéantir la petite vérole (1767)
- La Médecine pratique rendue plus simple, plus sûre et plus méthodique (1769 and 1772), 2 vols.
- Maison d'inoculation, lettre de M. Le Camus (Paris: Quillau, 1771)
