= Michiel Nouts =

Dutch painter

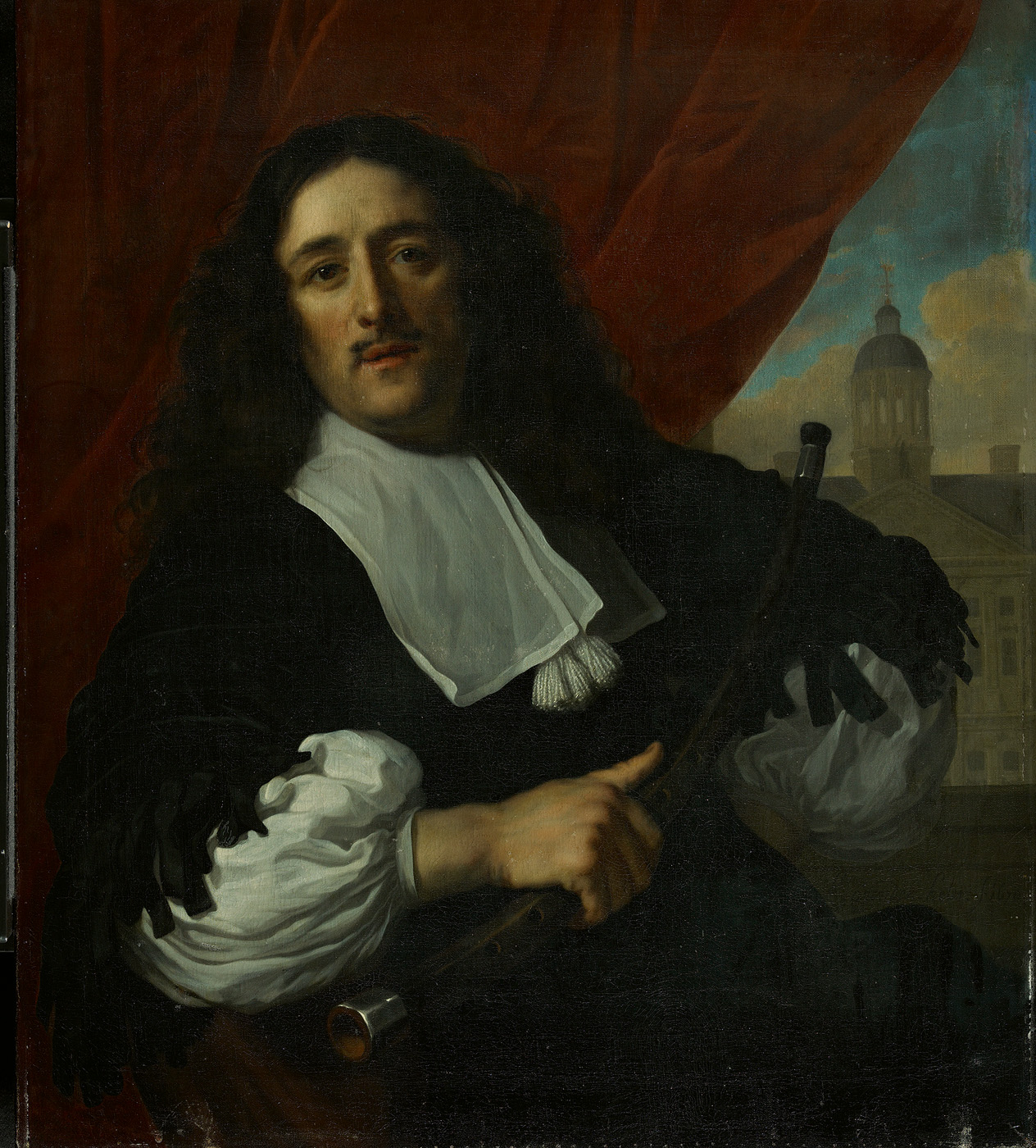
Michiel Nouts, 1670 portrait by Lodewijk van der Helst. The Amsterdam town hall, where Nouts served as carillonneur, can be glimpsed in the background of the painting. Amsterdam Museum

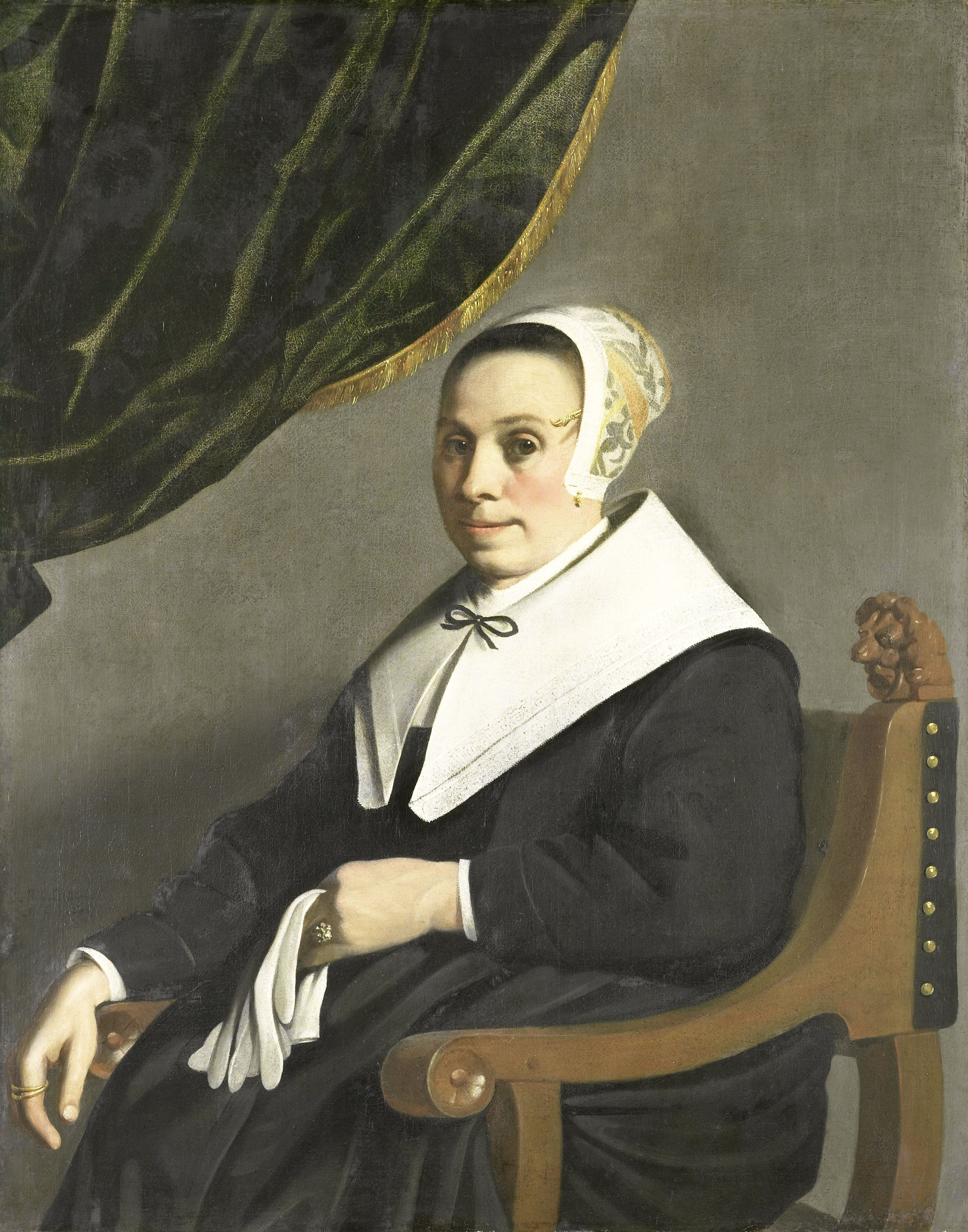
Portrait of a woman (1656), the only work attributed to Nouts with certainty. Rijksmuseum

Michiel Servaesz. Nouts or Nuyts (baptised 13 April 1628 in Delft — buried 13 July 1693 in Amsterdam) was a Dutch Golden Age painter who also served as Amsterdam's town musician (Dutch: stadsspeelman).

== Career ==
Nouts may have been active as a painter in his native Delft before he moved to Amsterdam. His painting style suggests that he was influenced by the Delft painter Johannes Vermeer.

The Rijksmuseum in Amsterdam has a painting by Nouts in its collection, entitled Portrait of a woman (1656). The oil painting was signed by Nouts and is the only work that can be attributed to him with certainty. The portrayed woman is possibly Nouts' first wife, Marritje Eduwarts van Uytrecht. The National Gallery in London has a painting of a family dating to about 1655 which has also been attributed to Nouts. However, this work has not been attributed to him with certainty, but on the basis of similarities with the painting in the Rijksmuseum.

In addition to his painting career, Nouts was also active as a brass musician, and frequently played at weddings and parties. In 1659, Nouts was appointed klokkenist and tonnist ordinaris (carillonneur) for the new Amsterdam town hall, even though its clock tower had not even been built. Until the town hall clock tower and the carillon, built by the brothers Hemony, were ready in 1666, he played the carillon of the Zuiderkerk church, and he continued to play the Zuiderkerk carillon until his death in 1693.

Lodewijk van der Helst, son of Bartholomeus van der Helst, painted a portrait of Nouts in 1670 which is now in the collection of the Amsterdam Museum. In the background of this painting, the town hall can be glimpsed. It was not established until the late 19th century that the painting depicts Nouts.

In addition to playing the carillons, he also carried out maintenance on the clocks of the Koopmansbeurs exchange and various towers: the Jan Roodenpoortstoren, the Haringpakkerstoren and the Montelbaanstoren.

== Biography ==
Nouts was named after his grandfather Michiel Nouts, who moved from Antwerp to Delft in about 1610 and worked there as a potter. His father Servaes Nouts was also a painter. In 1656, he left Delft for Amsterdam, where he initially earned a living as a musician at weddings. A year later, he secured poorter rights and married Marritje Eduwarts van Uytrecht. The couple lived on Raamgracht canal. Marritje died in 1665 and was buried in the Zuiderkerk.

In the period 1658–1662, Nouts changed his surname to Nuyts, possibly an attempt to become associated with the Amsterdam regenten family Nuyts.

After Marritje's death, he fell into financial difficulties and had to relocate from the Raamgracht to the much less affluent Koningsstraat. The town of Amsterdam paid him an annual salary of 275 guilders to play the town hall carillon, far less than other artists received. Nouts protested his unequal treatment and managed to secure better pay in 1669. That same year he remarried. His new wife was a much younger woman from the Korte Koningsstraat, Gesina Gerritsdr Vos. They moved into a house on the Wolvenstraat. Although Gesina was 20 years his junior, she survived him by just four months.
