= Elisabeth Baulacre =

Genevan businessperson

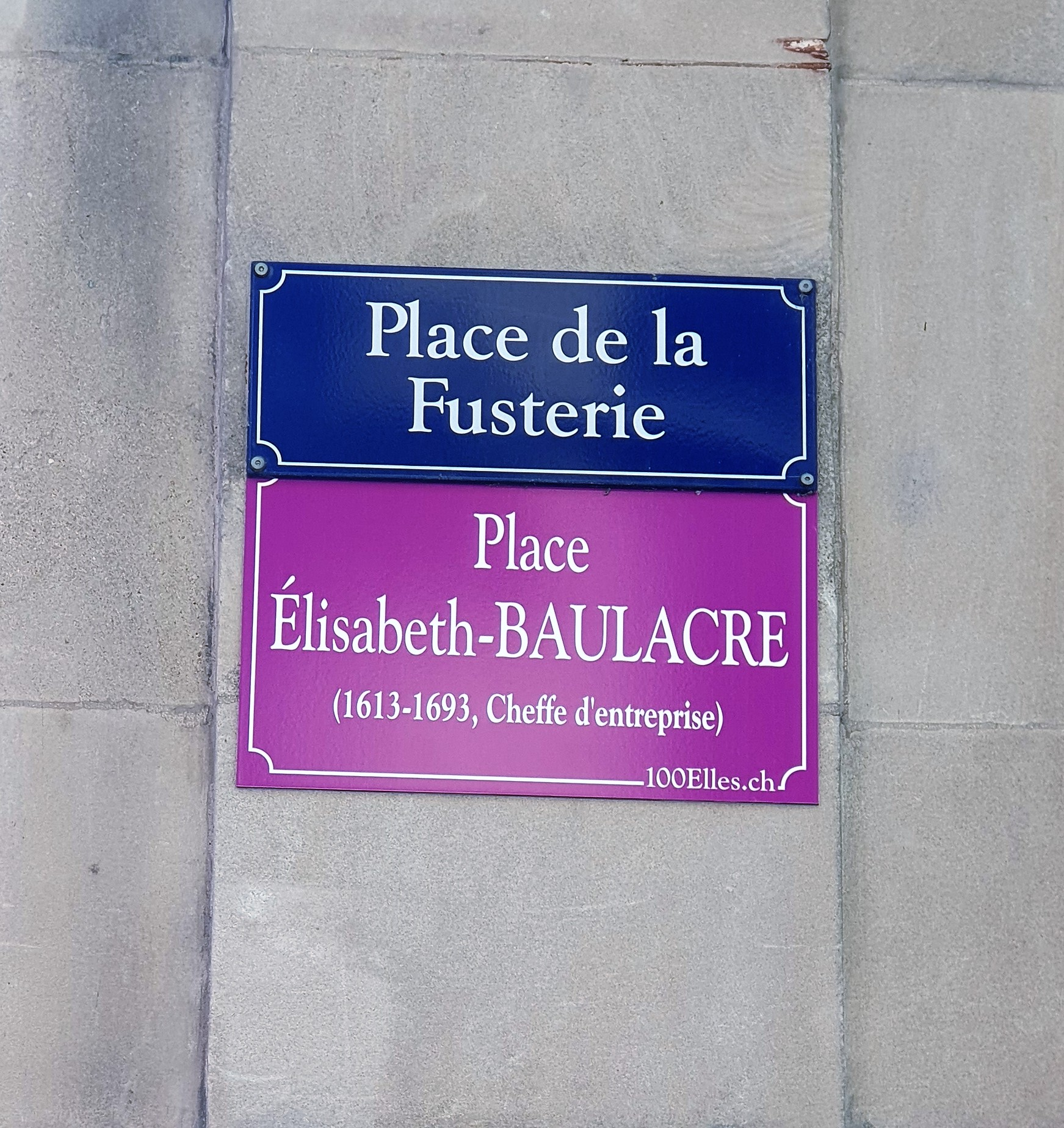
Place Elisabeth Baulacre - Place de la Fusterie

Elisabeth Baulacre (1613–1693), was a Genevan businessperson.

From 1641 onward, when her first husband Pierre Perdriau died, she developed and managed the manufacture of passementerie she inherited from him, and more specifically the silver and gold threads business which was needed for the passementerie.

According to the 17th-century historian Gregorio Leti she employed 1200 salaried workers, who tailored for her at their own homes. She also sponsored the long apprenticeship of goldbeating (five to six years) of several young craftsmen, in order to secure the gold threads she needed for her trade. Her business became the most important one in Geneva in 1680, and remained thus until 1708. She died with the second largest personal fortune in Geneva.

She also had the reputation of being a "syndics maker".

== Related links ==
- Dorure (Gilding), in the Historical Dictionary of Switzerland (in French, German and Italien).
