= Diego de Torres Villarroel =

Spanish writer and dramatist (1693–1770)

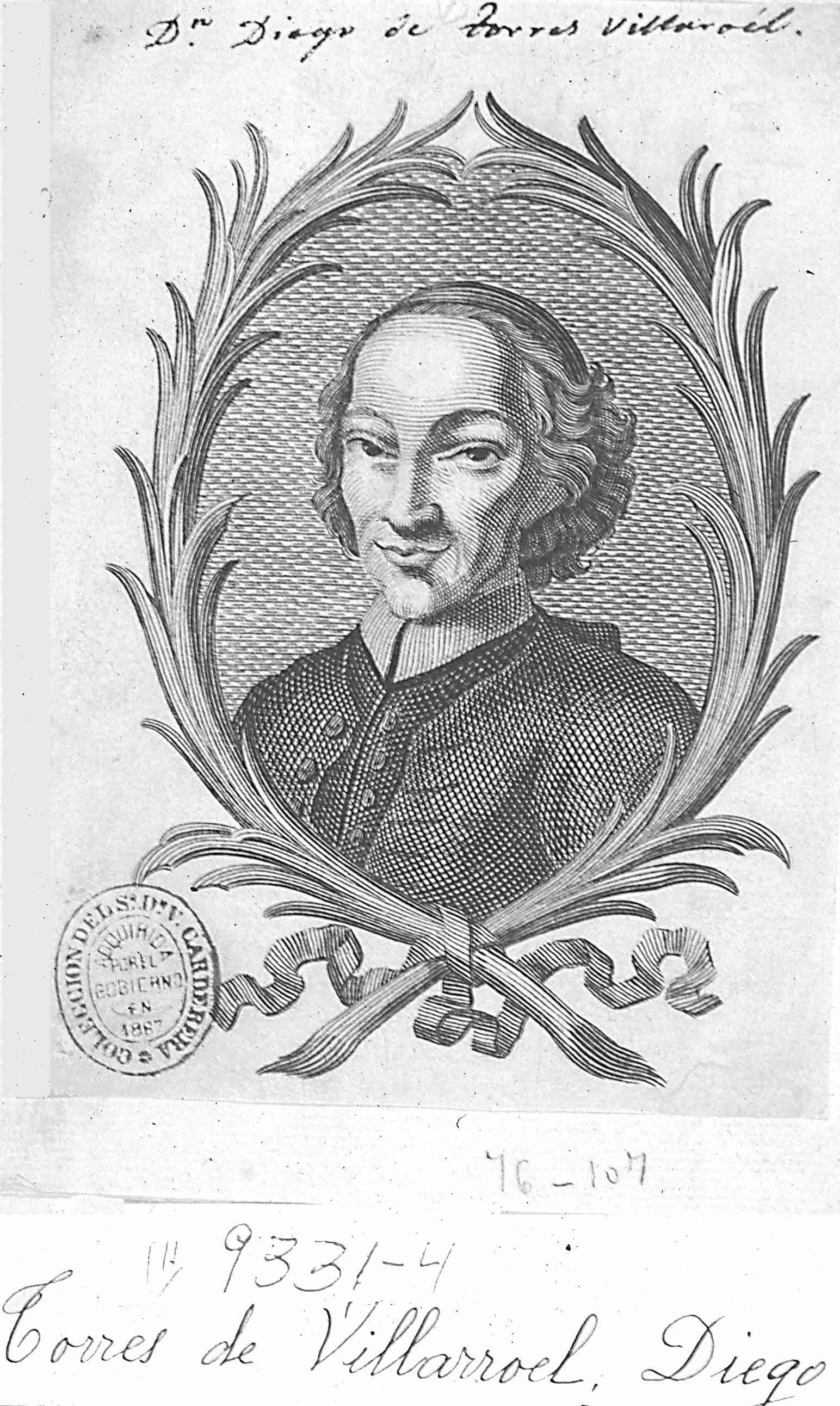
- Born: 17 June 1693; Salamanca, Crown of Castile
- Died: 19 June 1770 (aged 77); Salamanca, Spain
- Other name: Gran Piscátor
- Citizenship: Spain
- Education: Colegio Trilingüe, University of Salamanca
- Occupations: Mathematician, professor, writer, priest
- Notable work: Vida, ascendencia, nacimiento, crianza y aventuras del Doctor Don Diego de Torres Villarroel, Sueños morales, visiones y visitas de Torres con D. Francisco de Quevedo por Madrid

Diego de Torres Villarroel (1693 – 19 June 1770) was a Spanish writer, poet, dramatist, doctor, mathematician, priest and professor of the University of Salamanca. His most famous work is his autobiography, Vida, ascendencia, nacimiento, crianza y aventuras del Doctor Don Diego de Torres Villarroel (first published 1743).

== Life ==
Villarroel was born in Salamanca and baptised on 18 June 1694. His father was a poor bookseller and his mother was a draper's daughter. After an elementary education he went on to study Latin under Juan González de Dios, who later became professor of humanities at the University of Salamanca. Villarroel was then enrolled at the Colegio Trilingüe in Salamanca. However, at this stage the young Villarroel had little love for learning and his wayward and disruptive behaviour led to trouble with the authorities. It was only when he began to read the books in his father's shop that he discovered a fondness for mathematics and astrology.

Villarroel was in such disgrace with the college authorities that he decided to flee to Portugal where he led an adventurous life in which he was successively a hermit, a dancing-master, an alchemist, a mathematician, a soldier, a bullfighter, a student of medicine and an astrologer. On his return to Salamanca, he settled down to a serious programme of reading books on science, magic and mathematics, while earning his living by publishing almanacs and annual predictions under the pseudonym of "The Great Piscator of Salamanca". In 1724, he successfully predicted the death of the young King Luis I.

In 1723 he moved to Madrid where he made many influential friends. He studied medicine and graduated in the city of Ávila. Back in Madrid, he became so poor that he decided to take up smuggling to make money but he was saved by the patronage of the Countess of Arcos, whose house he had tried to rid of a poltergeist.

After a few years, Villarroel once more returned to Salamanca where he learned that the chair of mathematics at the university was empty and decided to apply for the post. He easily defeated his only rival and was made professor, even though his knowledge of the subject was still rudimentary.

In 1732 Villarroel was banished from Spain for helping his friend Don Juan de Salazar in a dispute which had turned violent. The two had tried to escape to France but had returned to Spain to face the consequences. Villarroel spent his exile in Coimbra, Portugal until a royal decree allowed him back to Salamanca in 1734. From then on he dedicated his time to his post at the university, to writing various works and paying frequent visits to Madrid, where he made the acquaintance of the Duchess of Alba. In 1743 he published the first four chapters of his autobiography, which enjoyed a tremendous success (chapter five appeared some time before 1752 and chapter six in 1758).

In 1750 he was allowed to retire on a pension by royal decree. His life became much quieter and in 1752 he published a complete edition of his works by public subscription. This was highly unusual for the time and attests to Villarroel's popularity as an author. He died on 19 June 1770 at the age of 77.

== Influence of Leonese language ==
Torres Villarroel used elements of the Leonese language in several of his works. Indeed, Leonese language prefixes like "peri" (more), palatalizations (llo, lla, llas), verbal forms like "jicioren" (they made, in Spanish "hicieron"), "salioren" (they went out, Spanish "salieron") or "dixioren" (they said, Spanish "dijeron") often appear in his works.

== Works ==
Villarroel had a poor opinion of his own knowledge of mathematics and science, a result of the low quality of education available in the Spain of his era. As he wrote: "I knew well my ignorance and blindness as I went groping down the alleyways of my profession. But I also knew that I was in the land of the blind, for Spain lay in the grip of a darkness so fearsome that in no school, college or university in any one of its cities was there an individual capable of lighting a lamp whereby one might seek out the elements of these sciences. In the country of the blind the one-eyed man is king" (quoted by Atkinson, page 24).

Today Villarroel is more famous as a writer. In twenty years he received more than 2,000 ducados per year. He was a prolific and popular author on numerous subjects with a style modelled on that of Francisco de Quevedo whose Sueños (satirical visions of Hell) he imitated in his Sueños morales, visiones y visitas de Torres con D. Francisco de Quevedo por Madrid(1727–1751).

He wrote Los desdichados del mundo y la gloria (1737), He also wrote poems and plays, but his most important work is his picaresque account of his own life entitled Vida, ascendencia, nacimiento, crianza y aventuras del doctor don Diego de Torres Villarroel, (1743, with further additions later), divided into six chapters, each dealing with a decade of his life.

He also wrote scientific works such as Anatomía de lo visible e invisible de ambas esferas (1738) and works about the lives of saints (e.g. Vida de Sor Gregoria de Santa Teresa) and poets (Vida de Gabriel Álvarez de Toledo).

Villarroel was a favourite author of the young Jorge Luis Borges.

== List of works ==
- Obras de Torres (1752)
- Vida, ascendencia, nacimiento, crianza y aventuras del doctor don Diego de Torres y Villarroel (1743)
- Sueños morales, visiones y visitas de Torres con D. Francisco de Quevedo por Madrid (1727–1751)
- El ermitaño y Torres (1752)
- Correo del otro Mundo al Gran Piscátor de Salamanca : cartas respondidas a los muertos por el mismo Piscátor.
- Los desahuciados del mundo y de la gloria (1737)
- El duende.
- Noticia de las virtudes medicinales de la Fuente del Caño de la villa de Babilafuente.
- Usos y provechos de las aguas de Tamames y baños de Ledesma.
- Viaje fantástico del Gran Piscátor de Salamanca / por su author el Bachiller Don Diego de Torres.
- Visiones y visitas de Torres con don Francisco de Quevedo por la Corte.
- Conversaciones Physico-Médicas y Chímicas de la Piedra Filosofal. (1752)

Poetry

- El presente siglo

Sonnets

- A una dama
- A la memoria de D. Juan Domingo de Haro y Guzmán
- Ciencia de los cortesanos de este siglo
- Confusión y vicios de la Corte
- ¿Cuándo vendrá la muerte?
- Cuenta los pasos de la vida
- Engulle el poderoso rica sopa
- Escribe a Lesbia ausente
- Pago que da el mundo a los poetas
- Respuesta a Filis
- Vida bribona

== Sources ==
- The Remarkable Life of Don Diego, a translation of Villarroel's autobiography by William C. Atkinson (Folio Society, 1958)
- Chisholm, Hugh, ed. (1911). "Torres y Villaroel, Diego de" . Encyclopædia Britannica. Vol. 27 (11th ed.). Cambridge University Press. p. 61.
