= Adriaantje Hollaer =

Dutch woman painted by Rembrandt

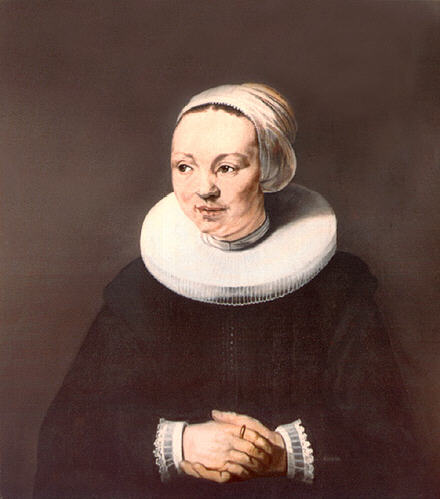
- Born: 1610; Rotterdam
- Died: 31 March 1693 (aged 82–83); Rotterdam

Adriaantje Hollaer (1610–1693) was a Dutch woman known today for her portrait by Rembrandt, currently in a private collection.

Hollaer was born in Rotterdam as the daughter of the merchant Pieter Jacobs Hollaer and Ingetje Rochusd. She married the painter Hendrik Martenszoon Sorgh on 20 February 1633. They had at least five children, and their son Maerten lived until 1702. Her portrait featured during the years 1947–1950 on the Dutch banknote for 100 guilders.

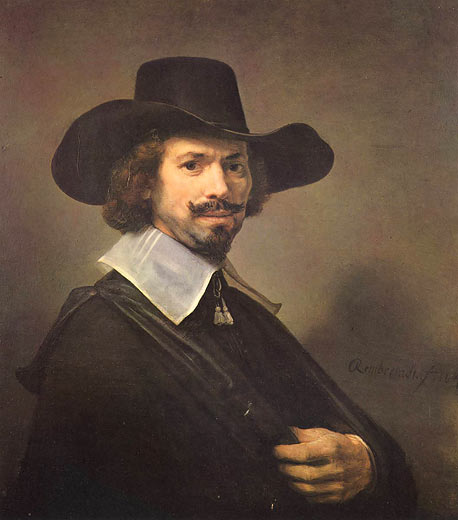
Marriage portrait of Hendrik Sorgh

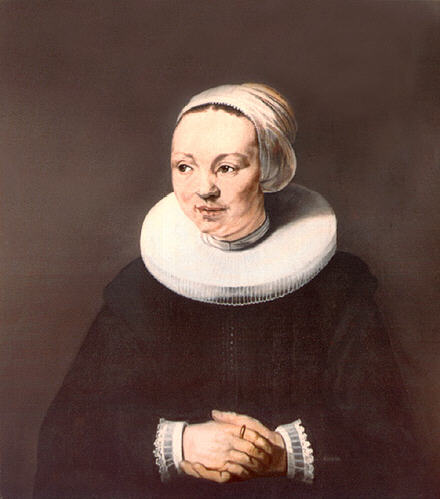
Pendant portrait of Adriaantje Hollaer

Hollaer died in Rotterdam.
