= Unshō =

Shingon monk

Unshō (運敝, 20 November 1604 – 9 October 1693) was a Japanese Shingon monk active in the early Edo period. He was born into the Fujiwara clan, and he may have been originally from Osaka. His art name was Hakunyo (泊如), and his courtesy name was Genshun (元春).

== Life ==
He was born on 20 November 1614 (the nineteenth day of the tenth month of Keichō 19 according to the Japanese calendar). He is said to have been from Osaka. He was born into the Fujiwara clan. When was thirteen (according to Japanese reckoning) he joined a Buddhist temple, and became a monk at sixteen.

He was a diligent student, and was said to have learning well beyond his years. When he was 35, he was invited to the Owari Chōkyū-ji. He lectured the lord of Owari Domain on the Buddhist sutras and earned his respect and admiration. At 39, he returned to the Chishaku-in in Kyoto. At 41, he was dispatched to Enpuku-ji, the Chishaku-in's fure-gashira in Edo. In 1661, he became the seventh abbot of Chishaku-in, a position he held for twenty years. In 1682 (Tenna 2), he retired to Rakuhoku Zuiō-san Yōmei-bō (洛北瑞応山養命坊).

He died on 9 October 1693 (the tenth day of the ninth month of Genroku 6).

== Names ==
His secular family name was Fujiwara. His art name was Hakunyo, and his courtesy name was Genshun.

== Writings ==
In 1639 (Kan'ei 16), when he was in his mid-twenties, he published a afterword to Bunsei's (文性) Hannya Shingyō Hiken Bunrin (般若心経秘鍵文林, a commentary on the Heart Sutra). From then on, he self-published an immense volume of his own writings. During his time at Enpuku-ji, he devoted much of his scholarly energy to commentary on Kūkai's Sangō Shiiki.

The majority of his writings are commentaries on Buddhist texts, but of particular note are his commentaries on Kūkai's writings, especially the seventeen-volume commentary on the Shōryōshū (published Keian 2, or 1649) and the seven-volume commentary on the Sangō Shiiki (published Kanbun 3, or 1663).

== Works cited ==
- Masaki, Akira (1994). "Unshō" 運敝. Asahi Nihon Rekishi Jinbutsu Jiten (in Japanese). Asahi Shinbun-sha.
- Ueno, Yōzō (1983). "Unshō". Nihon Koten Bungaku Daijiten 日本古典文学大辞典 (in Japanese). Vol. 1. Tokyo: Iwanami Shoten. p. 326. OCLC 11917421.
- Yoshida, Hiroaki (1994). "運敞 うんしょう （1614―1693）". Encyclopedia Nipponica (in Japanese). Shogakukan.
