= Johann Georg Keyßler =

Johann Georg Keyßler (or Keyssler when the letter ß is avoided; 1693–1743) was a German polymath, known for his travel writings and his archaeology. He is regarded as the father of German protohistory.

Neueste Reise durch Teütschland, Böhmen, Ungarn, die Schweitz, Italien und Lothringen, 1740

Born in Thurnau, Keyßler first studied at Halle. Upon returning to Thurnau he entered the service of the Giech counts as a steward. He later moved to Lauenburg to serve the counts of Bernstorff. As tutor to the sons and grandsons of the counts, he made numerous field trips to the neighboring states of Germany, including England in 1718, where he was elected a Fellow of the Royal Society.

His travelogues—composed as a series of letters—are an important source for geographical features and cultural monuments of his day. They were severely censored because of their discussion of political and economic conditions in the German states. Neueste Reisen durch Deutschland, Böhmen, Ungarn, die Schweiz, Italien und Lothringen was first published in German in 1740–41. An English translation, Travels through Germany, Bohemia, Hungary, Switzerland, Italy and Lorraine was first published in 1756.

Keyßler died at Gut Stintenburg, now Zarrentin am Schaalsee.

== Sources ==
- Ratzel, Friedrich (1882). "Keyßler, Johann Georg". Allgemeine Deutsche Biographie. Vol. 15. Historischen Kommission bei der Bayerischen Akademie der Wissenschaften. pp. 702–03.
