= Wolfgang Leinberer =

- Born: October 19, 1635; Stuttgart
- Died: June 22, 1693 (aged 57); Altötting
- Scientific career
- Fields: Mathematics, Astronomy, Philosophy
- Institutions: Society of Jesus

Wolfgang Leinberer (Stuttgart, October 19, 1635 – Altötting, June 22, 1693) was a priest in the Society of Jesus. He was German astronomer, philosopher, mathematician and professor, considered as "the most enthusiastic, even ingenious disciple in Rome of the famous mathematician Father Athanasius Kircher".

He taught grammar, humanities, rhetoric, mathematics and philosophy at the University of Ingolstadt. At the same institution, he was also a master of novices and rector. He worked as a socius of the Provincial for five years and an instructor of third-year priests in Altötting, a position which he kept until his death.

== Printed works ==
- Theoria cometae mense Decembri anni M.DC. LXIV lanuario item ac Februario Anni M. DC. LXV. Ingolstadii observati una cum tabula uranographica eiusdeim progressum exhibente. Adiecta insuper mantissa de novo cometa exeuente Martio labentis Anni nobis exorta Praeside Wolfgango Leinberer Soc. Jesu Matheseos Professore ordinario. In Catholica et Electorali Vniversitate Ingolstadiensi publicae concertationi proposita a ... Joanne Georgio Sneger... Mense Aprili die XXIX. Typis Joannis Ostermaieii Anno M. DC. LXV., 4°, pp. 20.
- Eclipsis solis Anno M. DC. LXVI. 11 Julii Ingolstadii observata, et una cum Paradoxis ex varia Mathesi depromptis publica disceptatione illustrata a Perillustri Domino Francisco Joanne Bronicki Comité a Bronice Equité Polono sacrae Regiae Majestatis Poloniae Cubiculario, Philosophiae et Matheseos Studioso. Praeside Wolfgango Leinberer Soc. Jesu, Matheseos Professore ordinario, Philosophicae Facultatis tum Decano. In Catholica et Electorali Universitate Ingolstadiana: IV Augusti Anno M. DC. LXVI. Tvpis Georgii Haenlini, 4º, pp. 16.
- Disputatio philosophica de Mundo elementari. Anno 1669. — Ded. a S. Fr. Xavier. — [Matth. Küsel's print, drawn by J. Uinbach].
- Disputatio Philosophica de Natura et Perfectione Mundi, quam in Calholica el Electorali Vniversitate Ingolstadiana publice defendendam suscepit Illustris ac Generosus D. Joonnes Chrislopliorus Mändl L. B. a Deütenhoven, Metaphisicae et Institutiouum Juris Studiosus. Praeside Wolfgango Leinbcrer Soc Jesu. Philosophiae Professore Ordinario. Mense Junio Anno M.DC LXX. Ingolsladii, apud Joannem Simonem Knab, 4º, pp. 43.
- Disputatio Philosophica de Authore et Origine Mundi, quam in Catholica et Electorali Vniversitate Ingolstadiana Praeside Wolfgango Leinberer Soc. Jesu Philosopliae Professore Ordinario, Publicé defendendam suscepit Nobilis ac Doctissimus Dominus Joannes Sigismundus Hueber, Frisingensis Bojus, Philosophiae Baccalaureus, Metaphys. et Medicinae Studiosus. Mense Junio. Anno M.DC.I.XX. Ingolstadii, apud Joannein Simonem Knab, 4°, pp. 28.
