= Lodewijk van der Helst =

Dutch Golden Age painter

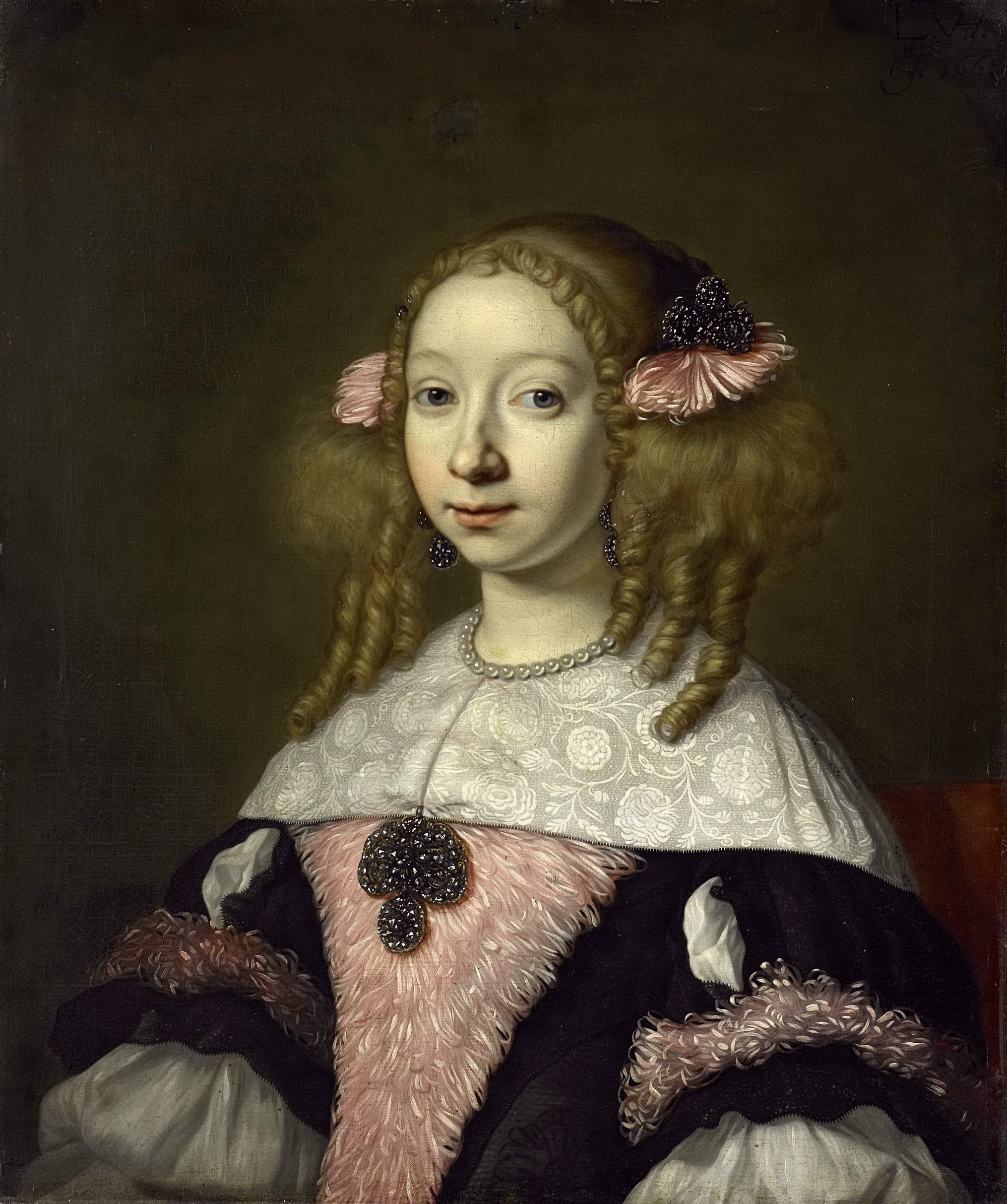
Portrait of Adriana Hinlopen (1646-1736), 1667

Lodewijk van der Helst (1642 – ?), was a Dutch Golden Age painter.

== Biography ==
He was born in Amsterdam in 1642 and was baptized on February 2 of the same year. Son and pupil of Bartholomeus van der Helst and grew up at Nieuwmarkt and was trained by his father, yet developed his own distinct artistic language and career. Early 1671 he and his sister Susanne assisted their mother when they visited their father's studio, located near Walloon church (behind "Vleeshal") where his belongings were registered. His father owned many painting by Willem van de Velde the younger, the schilder-boeck by Karel van Mander, Metamorphoses by Ovid, Serlio, Scamozzi, Vitruvius and Palladio; portraits of Dutch admirals (Egbert Bartholomeusz Kortenaer, etc.)

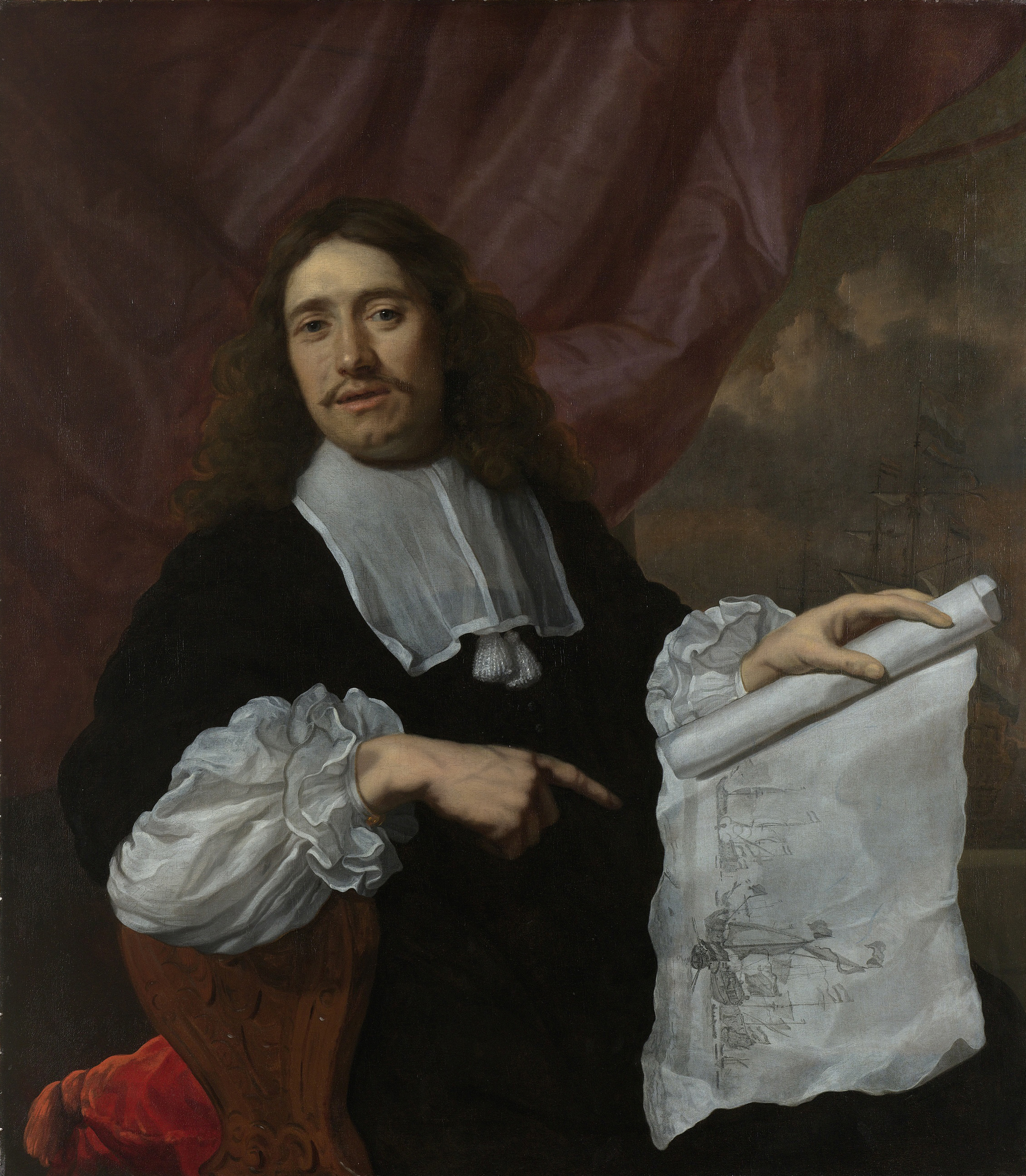
Willem van de Velde II (1633-1707), schilder Rijksmuseum SK-A-2236

The artist married in 1677, living on Herengracht. In 1680 a son Lodewijk was baptized. He appears to have left the city by 1684 after his wife died who left two children behind. His place and date of death is unknown. Lodewijks portrait of admiral Augustus Stellingwerf was engraved by Abraham Blooteling. His works are housed in several museums, including three in the Rijksmuseum in Amsterdam.

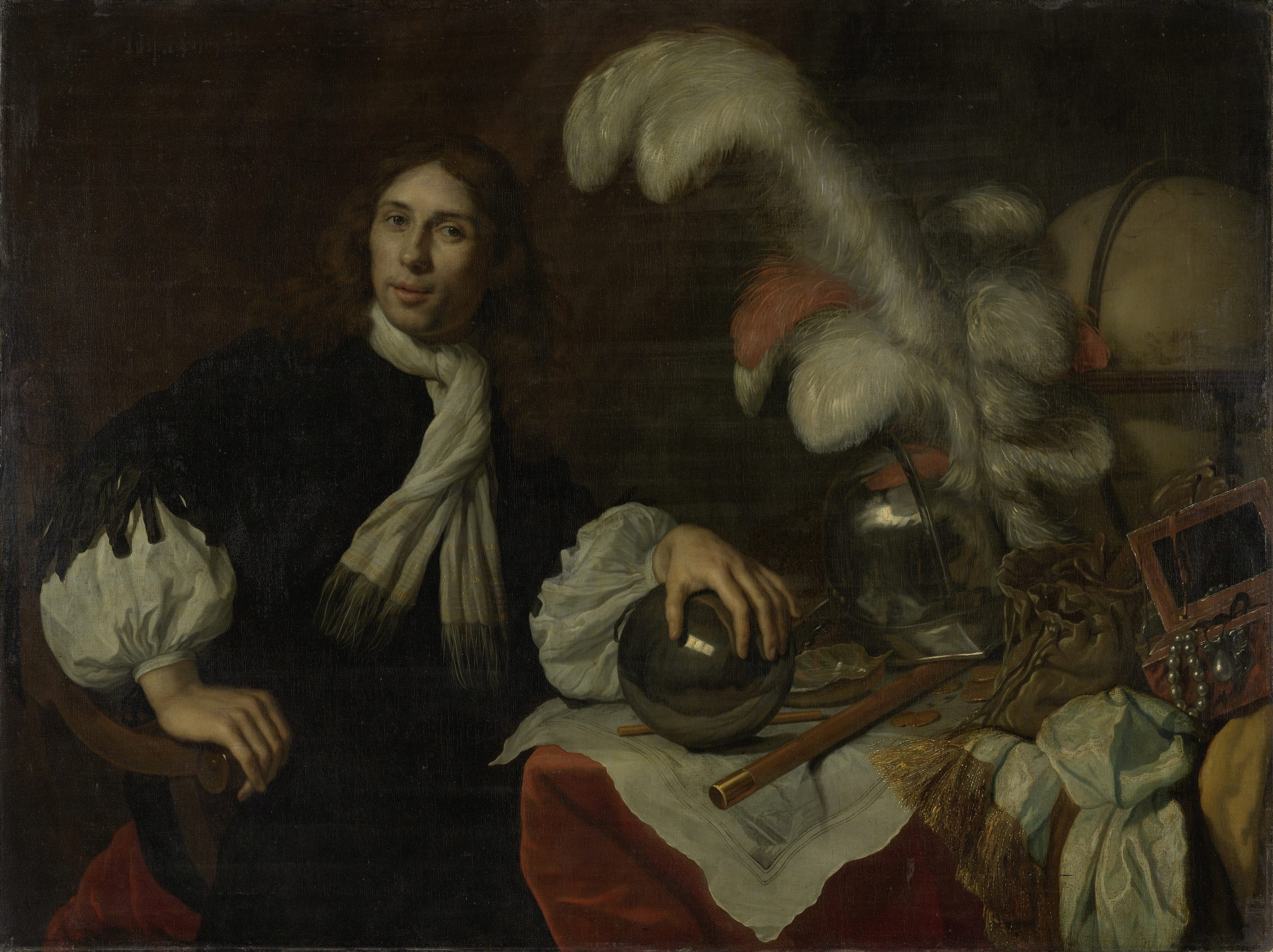
Posthuum portret van Aucke Stellingwerff. Admiraal van de admiraliteit van Friesland, gesneuveld in 1665 bij Lowestoft door een kanonskogel Rijksmuseum SK-A-148
