= Pedro Abarca =

Jesuit theologian

Pedro Abarca (1619 – 1 October 1693) was a Jesuit theologian.

== Life ==
Born in Aragon, he entered the Society of Jesus in 1641, and passed almost all his religious life as professor of scholastic, moral, and controversial theology, chiefly in the University of Salamanca. He died at Palencia.

== Works ==
Though not mentioned by Hugo von Hurter in the "Nomenclator," he has left many theological works, among which are five volumes in quarto on the Incarnation and the Sacraments; one in quarto on Grace, and several minor treatises on moral and dogmatic subjects. He wrote also extensively on points of history, via: "The Historical Annals of the Kings of Aragon," "The First Kings of Pampeluna," and has left many manuscripts and one work, which he withheld, about the Church of del Pilar.

== See also ==
· · ·
