= Antoine Ferrein =

French anatomist

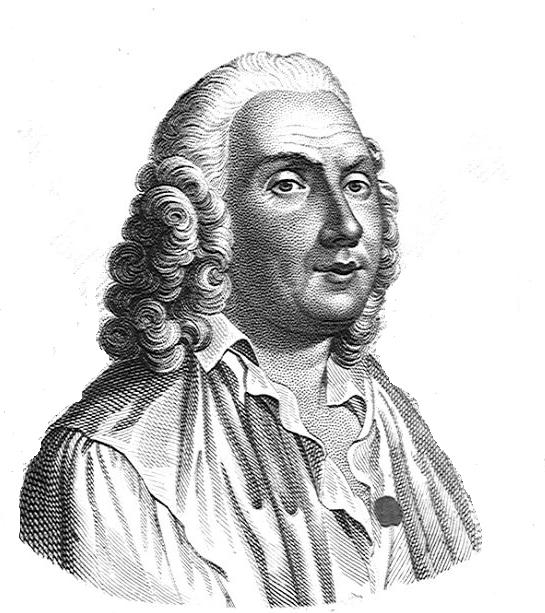
Antoine Ferrein.

Antoine Ferrein (October 25, 1693 – February 28, 1769) was a French anatomist who was a native of Frespech, which today is a commune in the arrondissement of Villeneuve-sur-Lot. He was a professor at the Collège Royal in Paris, and in 1742 became a member of the Académie des sciences.

Ferrein is remembered for his work involving the physiology of voice, and is credited for coining the term cordes vocales (vocal cords). He postulated that the ligaments of the larynx were analogous to the cords on a violin. He also made the correlation between the size of the glottis and the loudness of a person's voice. There are several anatomical eponyms attributed to Antoine Ferrein, including:

- "Ferrein's canal": (rivus lacrimalis); A space between the eyelids when closed and the eyeball through which tears flow to the lacrimal punctum.
- "Ferrein's foramen": Hiatus of facial canal that makes passage for the greater petrosal nerve.
- "Ferrein's ligament": The thickened external portion of the capsule of the temporomandibular joint.
- "Ferrein's pyramid": Also known as the medullary ray, which is the center of the renal lobule, and is shaped like a small pyramid.
- "Ferrein's vasa aberrantia": Aberrant biliary canaliculi that have no connectivity with hepatic lobules.
