= Abraham Begeyn =

Dutch Golden Age painter

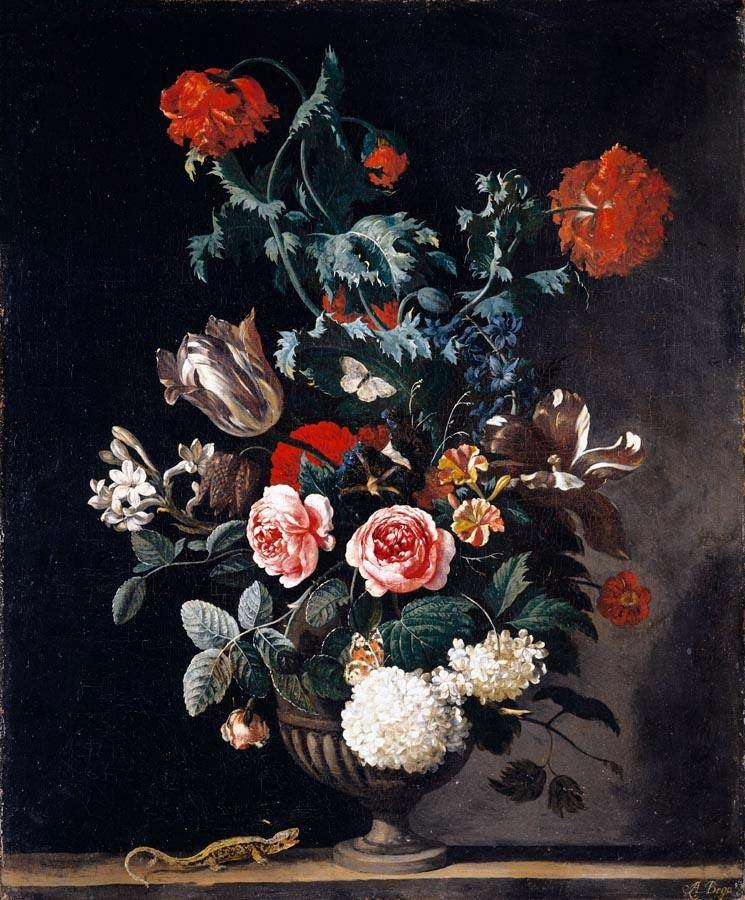
Flowers in a Stone Vase, 1670

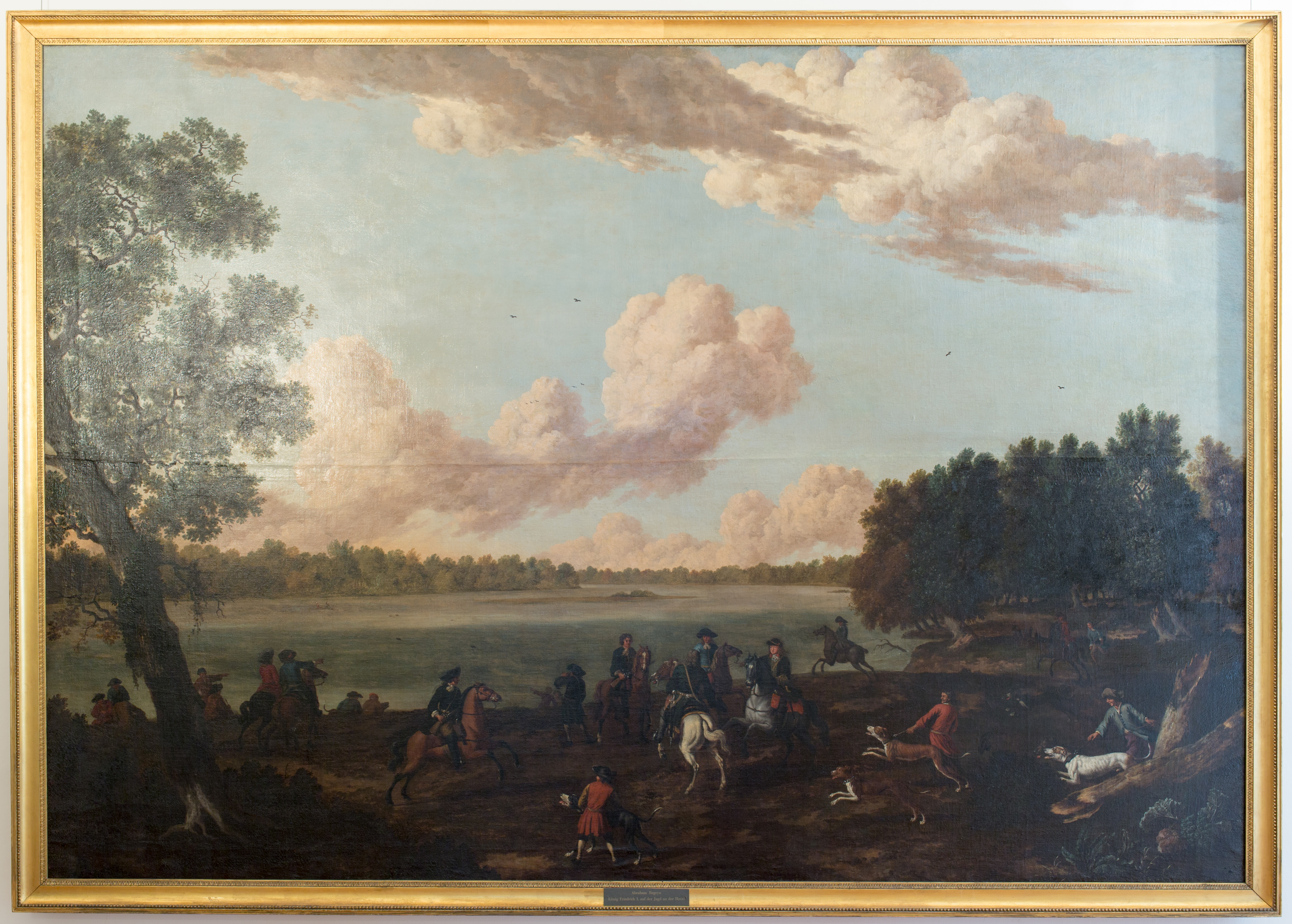
Abraham Begeyn: King Frederick I on the Hunt at Jagdschloss Grunewald

Abraham Begeyn (c. 1637 in Leiden – 11 June 1697 in Berlin), was a Dutch Golden Age painter.

== Biography ==
Begeyn was born in Leiden. Though perhaps known mostly for his Italianate landscapes and cattle in the manner of Nicolaes Pietersz Berchem, Begyn was a highly skilled painter active in many genres, who traveled widely. According to the RKD, Begeyn's earliest known work is from 1653, though he was first accepted into the Guild of St. Luke in Leiden in 1655. He stopped paying dues in 1667, because he set off for a trip to Italy. He is registered in Rome and Naples from 1659–1660. In the rampjaar or disaster year, of 1672, he is registered in Amsterdam, and after that he lived in London, where he painted at Ham House, Surrey, together with Willem van de Velde the Younger (1633–1707) and Dirck van Bergen (1645–1690). In 1681 he was in the Hague where two years later he became a member of the painters' confraternity 'Pictura'. He moved to Berlin in 1688, where he became Prussian court painter.

There his works were greatly prized, and, according to Houbraken, he was principal painter to Frederick III, the elector of Brandenburg, afterwards king of Prussia. He died of a heart attack when Augustinus Terwesten came to visit his studio, accompanied by two other painters. It is highly possible that he felt put under great pressure by Terwesten to perform, since Terwesten had also become court painter in Berlin and had also started an academy there, which opened in 1697. Begeyn died in Berlin.

In many collections in the Netherlands, the pictures of Begeyn are placed amongst those of the most admired masters. His pencilling is light and free, and his colouring very agreeable. Many of his works are landscapes like Peasants with Cattle by a Ruin, with views of rivers, ruins, and pieces of architecture, enriched with figures and a variety of animals. He is also known for his still life paintings of flowers and hunting paraphernalia.
