= Two Calves, a Sheep and a Dun Horse by a Ruin =

c. 1665 painting by Dirck van den Bergen

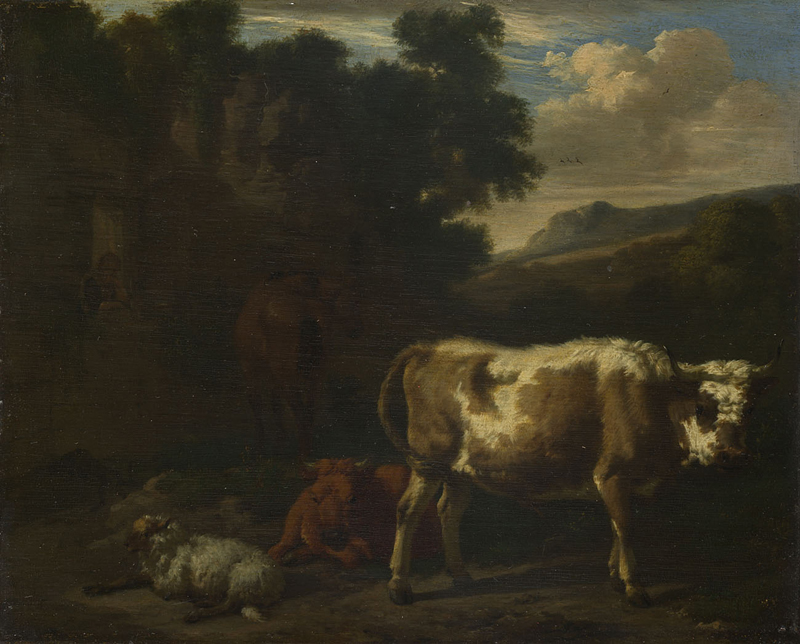
Two Calves, a Sheep and a Dun Horse by a Ruin (c. 1665) by Dirck van den Bergen

Two Calves, a Sheep and a Dun Horse by a Ruin is a c. 1665 oil on panel painting by Dirck van den Bergen, previously misattributed to Adriaen van de Velde. It is now in the National Gallery, London.
