= Willem Romeyn =

Dutch Golden Age landscape painter

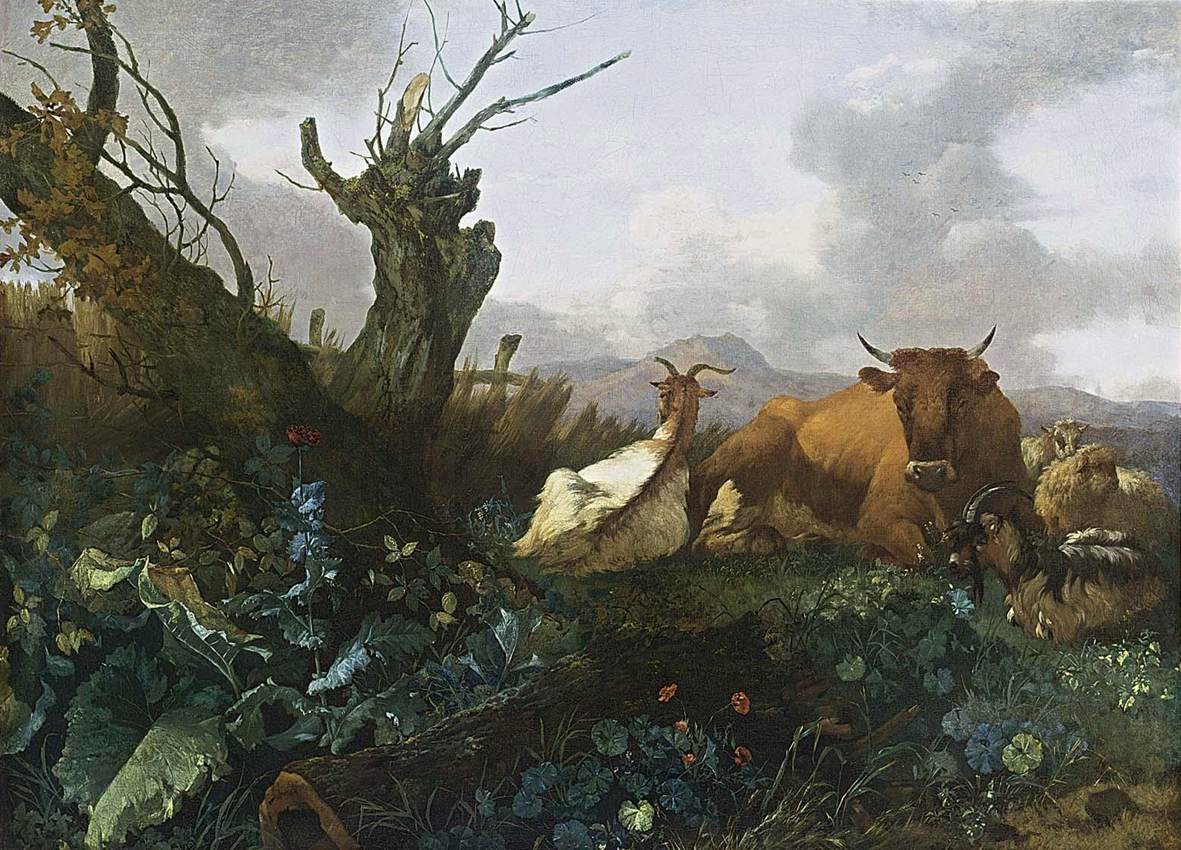
Cow, Goats and Sheep in a Meadow

Willem Romeyn (ca.1624, Haarlem – after 1693), was a Dutch Golden Age landscape painter.

== Biography ==
According to the RKD, Romeyn was a pupil of Nicolaes Berchem in Haarlem in 1642. His first dated works are from 1645, and his last dated work is from 1694. From 1646 onwards, he became a member of the Haarlem Guild of Saint Luke. In 1650–1651, he travelled to Rome. He returned to Haarlem and the guild there, where he was "vinder" in 1659 along with Frans de Hulst (deacon was Thomas Wijck). In 1661, he was the "oud-vinder", while Frans de Hulst was deacon and Jacob de Wet was vinder. He was nominated with Jacob de Wet again for "vinder" in 1670 (they lost to Jan de Bray and Gerrit Pietersen Berchem).

His landscapes often show grazing animals – particularly cattle and sheep, which have been confused in the past with the works of Berchem, Hendrik Mommers, Adriaen van der Kabel, Willem Buytewech, and Dirck Helmbreeker. Wilhelm von Kobell was his follower.
