= Peasants with Cattle by a Ruin =

Painting by Abraham Begeyn

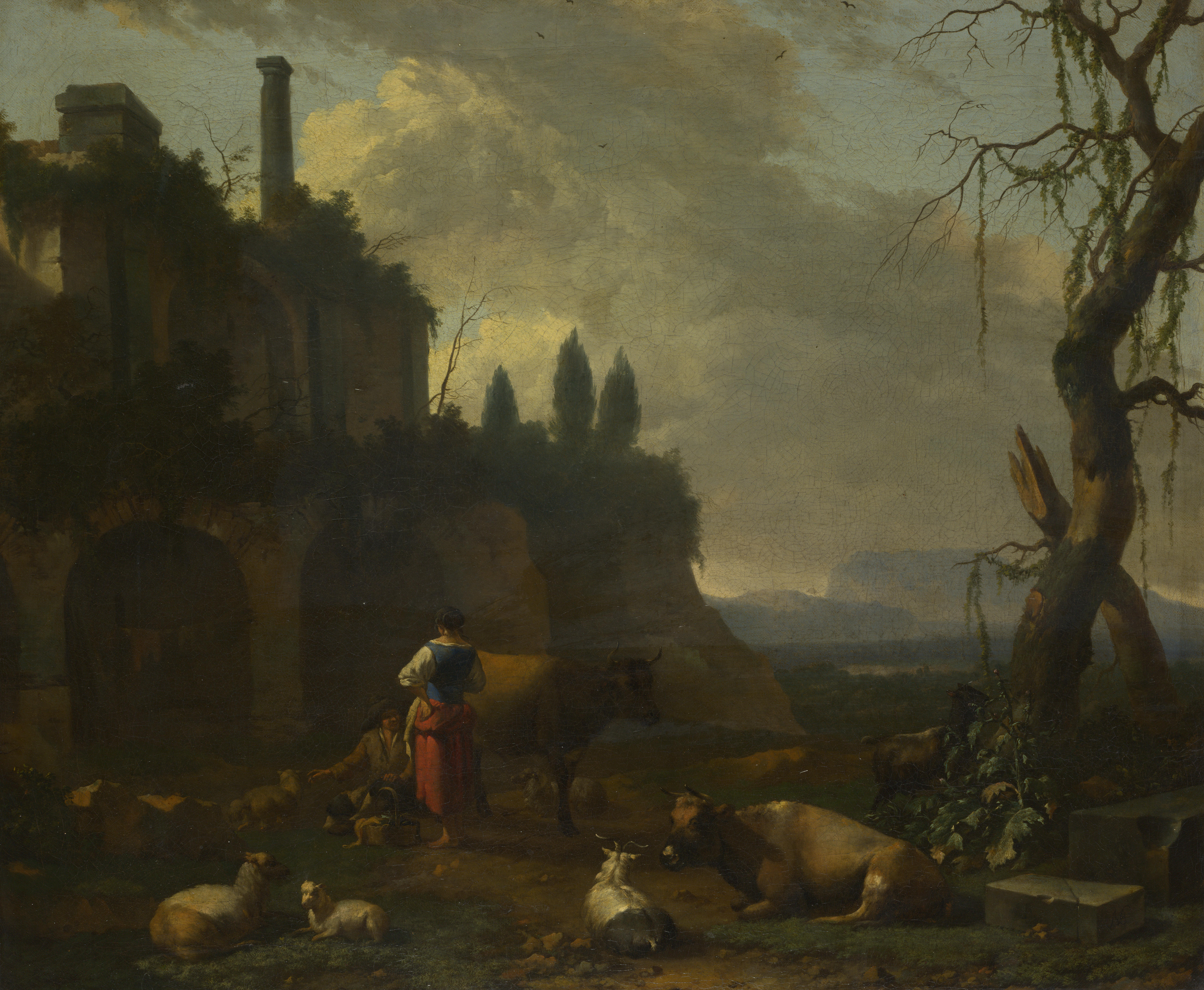
Peasants with Cattle by a Ruin by Abraham Begeyn

Peasants with Cattle by a Ruin is a 1650–1697 painting by Abraham Begeyn, now in the National Gallery, London. It shows a rural scene with a capriccio-style ruin.

A block of stone (bottom right) bears a monogram which probably refers to Nicolaes Berchem, but art historians hold that the monogram is probably a fake and that the attribution to Begeyn is secure.
