= Jan Hackaert =

Dutch Golden Age painter

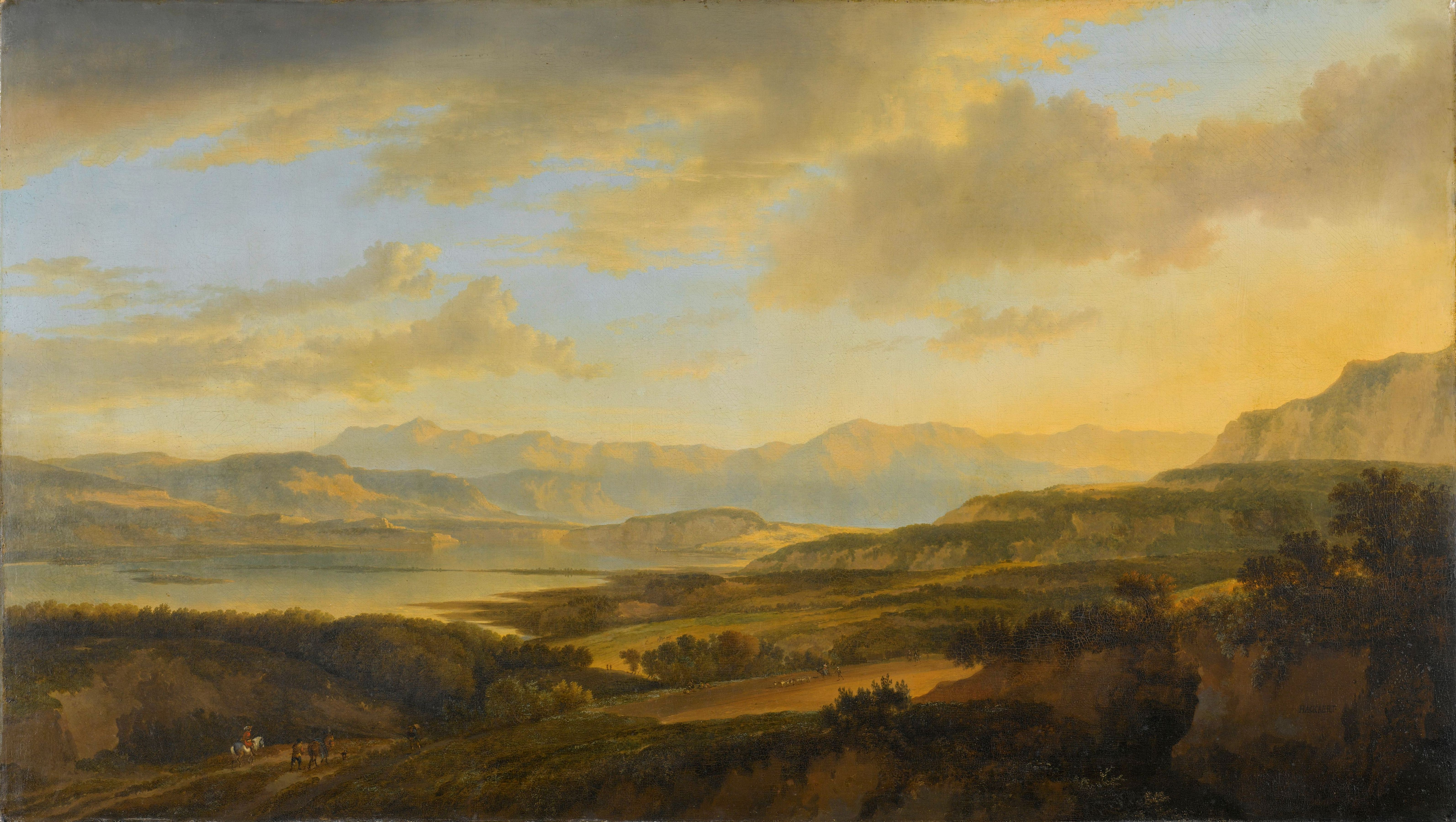
- Landscape with Lake Zurich.
- Born: 1 February 1628; Amsterdam, Netherlands
- Died: 1685 (aged 56–57); Amsterdam, Netherlands
- Known for: Landscape painting
- Movement: Baroque

Jan Hackaert (Dutch pronunciation: [jɑn ˈɦɑkaːrt]; 1628–1685) was a Dutch Golden Age painter.

== Biography ==
He travelled in Germany and Switzerland, and painted and sketched mostly landscapes. He would sketch miners at work in the mountains, and on more than one occasion this caused him trouble because the workers couldn't understand what he was doing. They felt he was either a spy or hexing them and made a complaint. Because Italianate landscapes were so fashionable, his Lake Zurich was mistaken for an Italian lake for years.

He painted the landscape backgrounds for other painters, such as Nicolas Berchem and Adriaen van de Velde.
