= Johannes van der Bent =

Dutch Golden Age painter

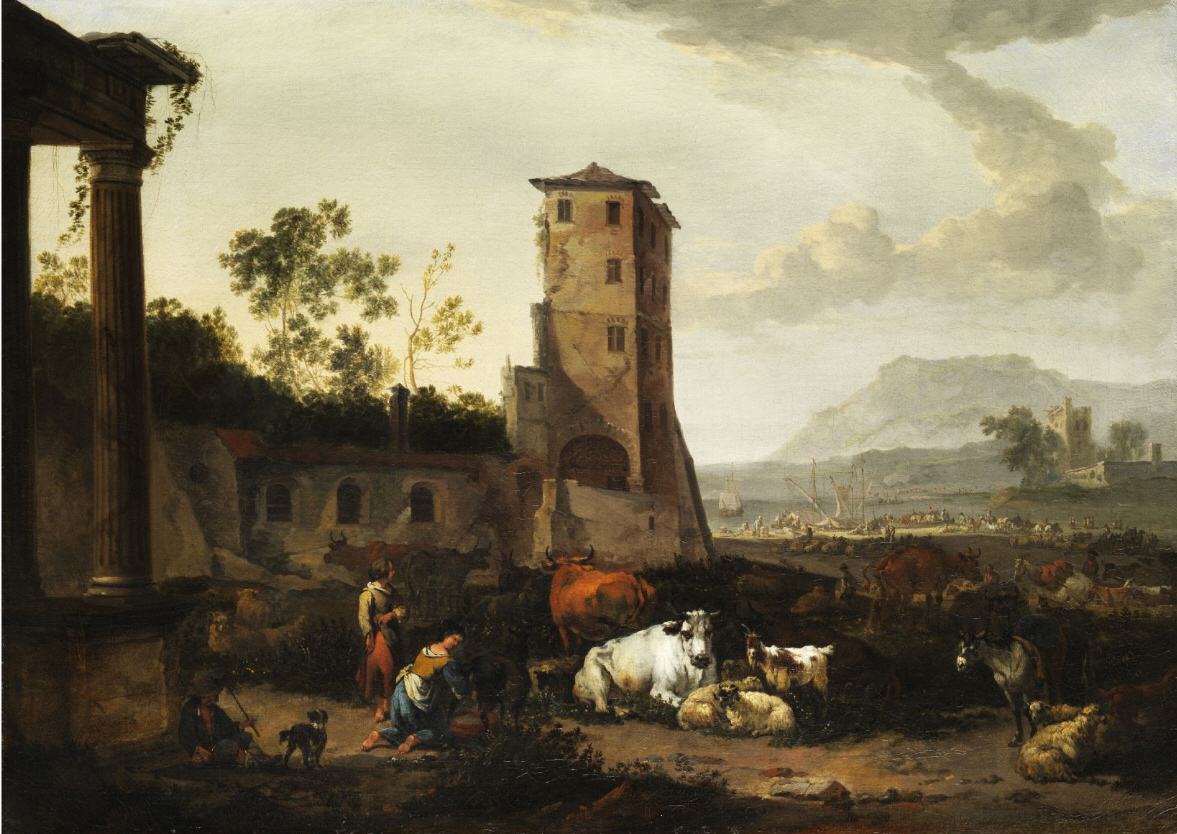
- 'Italianate landscape by van der Bent.
- Born: Johannes van der Bent c. 1650; Amsterdam
- Died: 1690 (aged 39–40); Amsterdam
- Known for: Painting
- Movement: Baroque

Johannes van der Bent (c. 1650–1690), was a Dutch Golden Age painter.

== Biography ==
According to Houbraken he was a student of Philips Wouwerman and Adriaen van de Velde. His birthdate is uncertain, but he was judged to be about forty when he died of tuberculosis. Houbraken thought he caught the disease from melancholy resulting from losing a large sum of money (said to be 4,000 Dutch florins, a very large sum for a painter to have), which depressed him. He always suspected his landlord, who rented him the room he had been staying in when it happened. It is unclear how he came into the possession of such a large sum of money, whether by selling paintings or by inheritance.

According to the Rijksbureau voor Kunsthistorische Documentatie (RKD), some of his works have been incorrectly attributed to Nicolas Berchem.
