= Dirk Maas =

Dutch Golden Age landscape painter

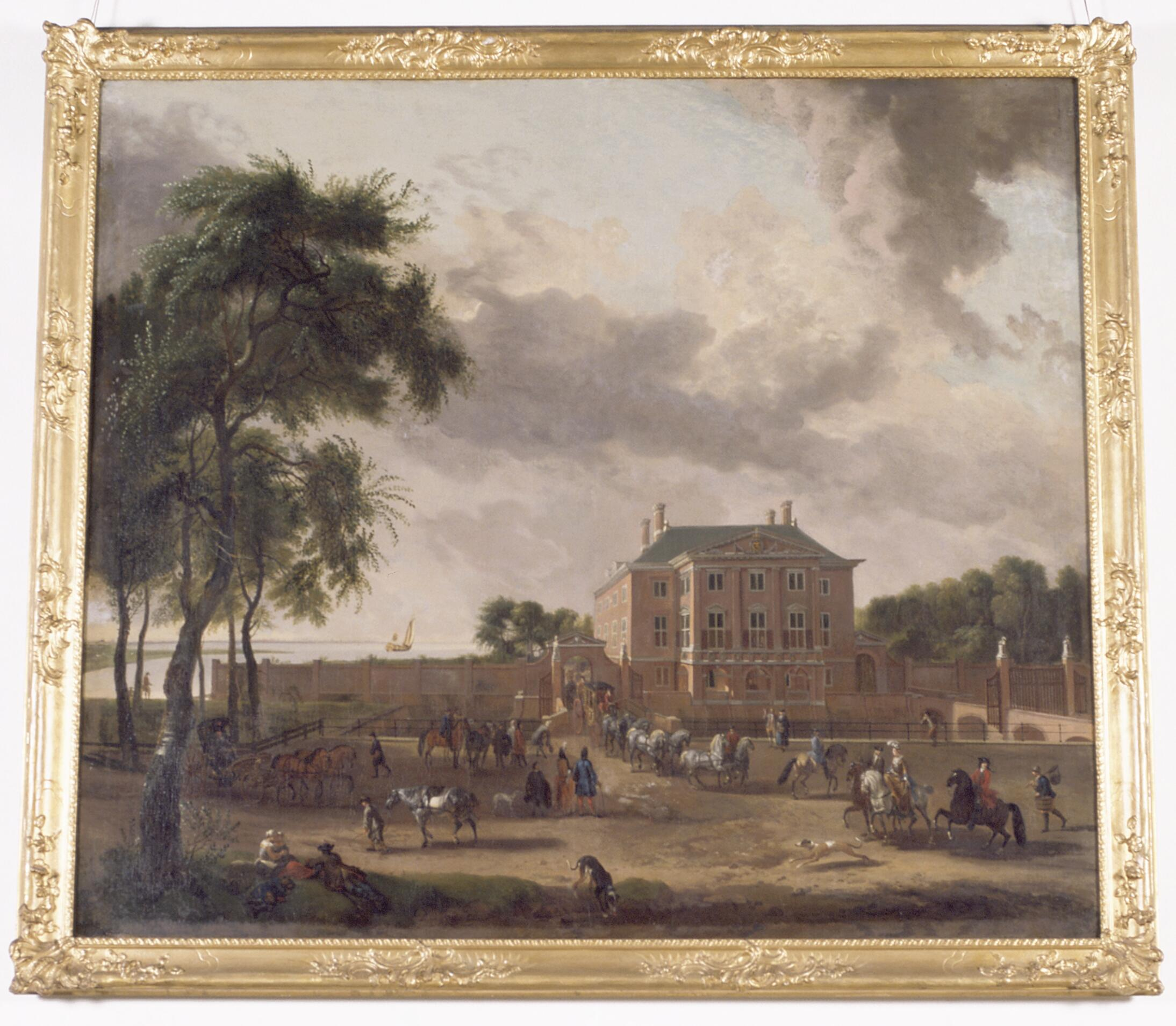
Gemeenlandshuis Zwanenburg, 1702

Dirk Maas (12 September 1659 – 25 December 1717), was a Dutch Golden Age landscape painter.

== Biography ==
Maas was born and died in Haarlem. According to Houbraken he was first a pupil of Hendrick Mommers, a Haarlem painter of vegetable market scenes, and then took lessons from Nicolaes Berchem, who he probably met through Mommers. Maas became a follower of Berchem's Italianate landscape painting. Eventually he took up with Jan van Huchtenburg, whereupon he devoted himself to painting horses.

According to the RKD he was first became a member of the Haarlem Guild of Saint Luke in 1678, and in 1690 he accompanied William III of England's army, where he painted the Battle of the Boyne first-hand. He was a pupil of Mommers, Berchem, and Huchtenburg who made prints, Italianate landscapes, and staffage for other painters. In 1697 he became a member of the Confrerie Pictura, though he seems to have remained active in Haarlem also.
