= Entrance to a Dutch Port =

1665 painting by Willem van de Velde the Younger

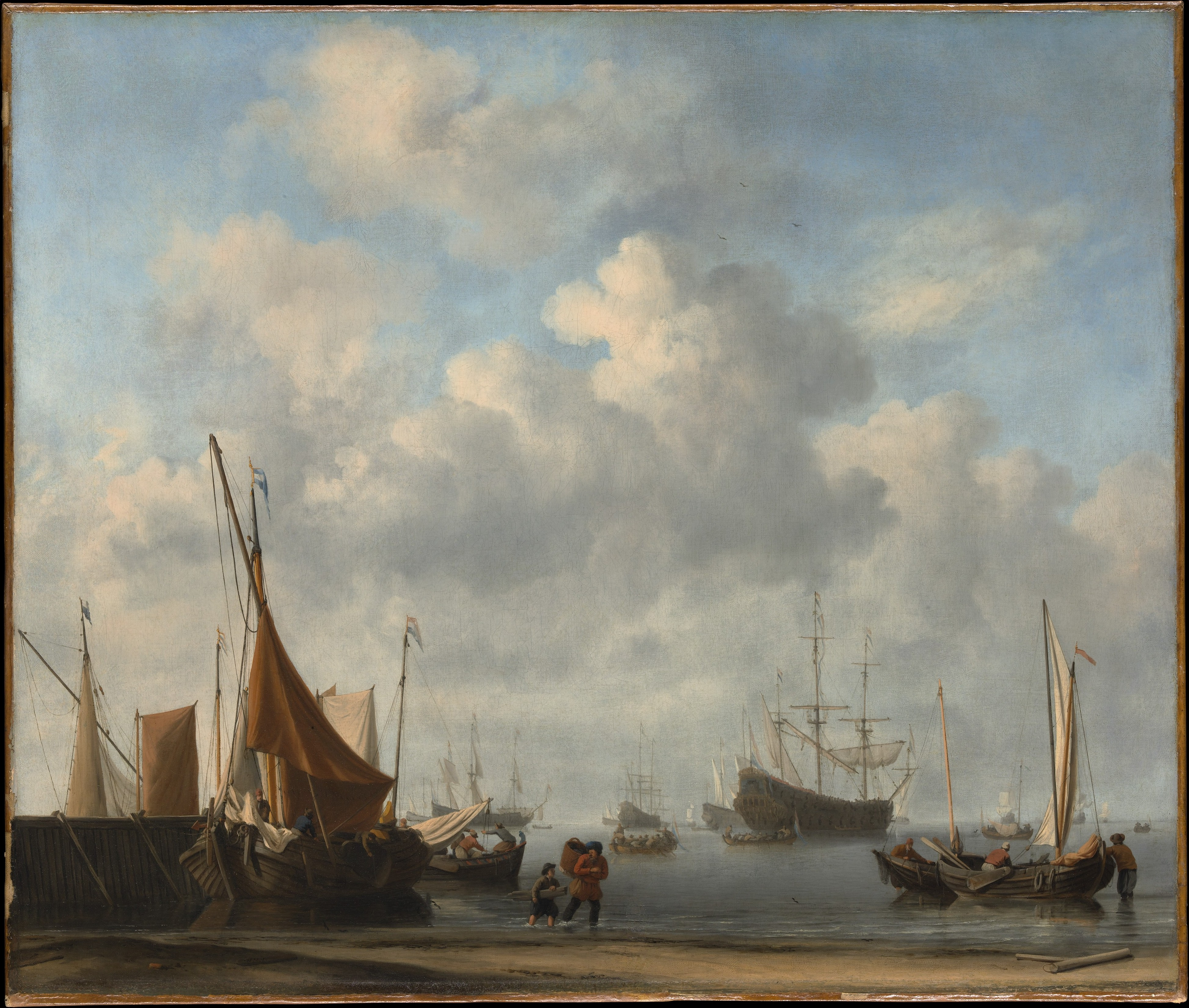
- Artist: Willem van de Velde the Younger
- Year: c. 1665
- Medium: Oil on canvas
- Dimensions: 65.7 cm × 77.8 cm (25.9 in × 30.6 in)
- Location: Metropolitan Museum of Art; New York

Entrance to a Dutch Port is an oil on canvas painting by Dutch artist Willem van de Velde the Younger, created c. 1665. The painting depicts a bustling harbor in the Netherlands. The work is indicative of the historical mercantile power of the Netherlands during the 17th century. Entrance to a Dutch Port is in the collection of the Metropolitan Museum of Art, in New York.

== Description ==
Entrance depicts a busy port in the Netherlands during the mid 17th century. The work is filled with details that would have been well known to Van de Velde (himself the son of a famous draftsman), such as a wooden breakwater and multiple types of ships. For the viewing audience, the painting evokes thoughts of a sunny, clear day in port with ships that have come safely home.
