= Dutch Ships in a Calm Sea =

1665 oil painting by Willem van de Velde the Younger

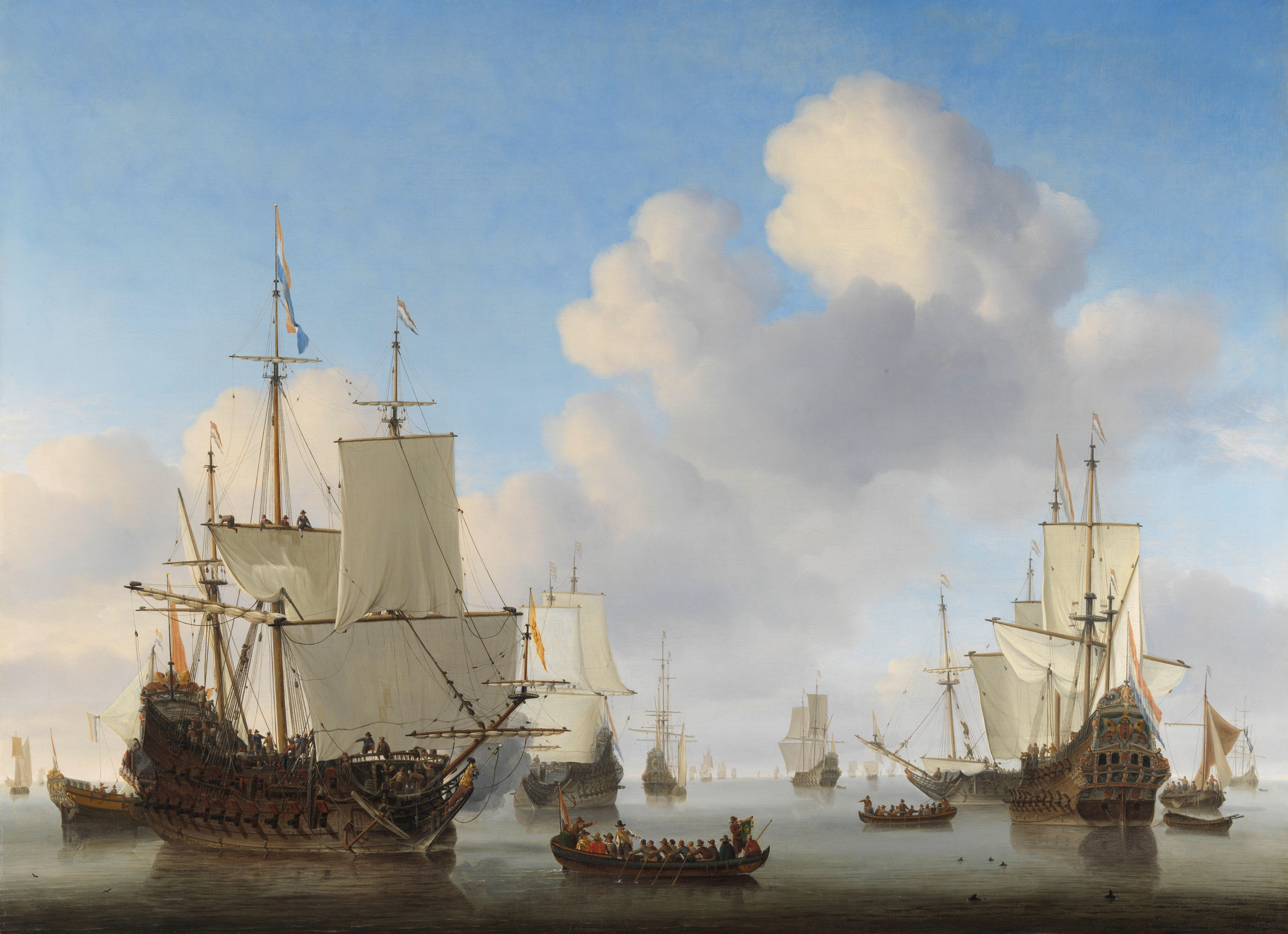
- Artist: Willem van de Velde the Younger
- Year: 1665
- Medium: oil painting on oak panel
- Dimensions: 35.7 cm × 43.3 cm (14.1 in × 17 in)
- Location: Rijksmuseum; Amsterdam, Netherlands

Dutch Ships in a Calm Sea is a 1665 oil-on-canvas painting by Dutch marine artist Willem van de Velde the Younger (1633–1707). The son of Willem van de Velde the Elder, who also specialized in marine art, he was first instructed by his father and later by Simon de Vlieger.

Most of Van de Velde's work represents shipping off the coast of the Netherlands. The vessels are painted with extremely intricate detail, providing a high-quality record of shipping in the period. He also excelled in his renderings of the sea and sky under various weather conditions. This painting is in the collection of the Rijksmuseum in Amsterdam.
