= Adriaen van de Velde =

Dutch painter and engraver

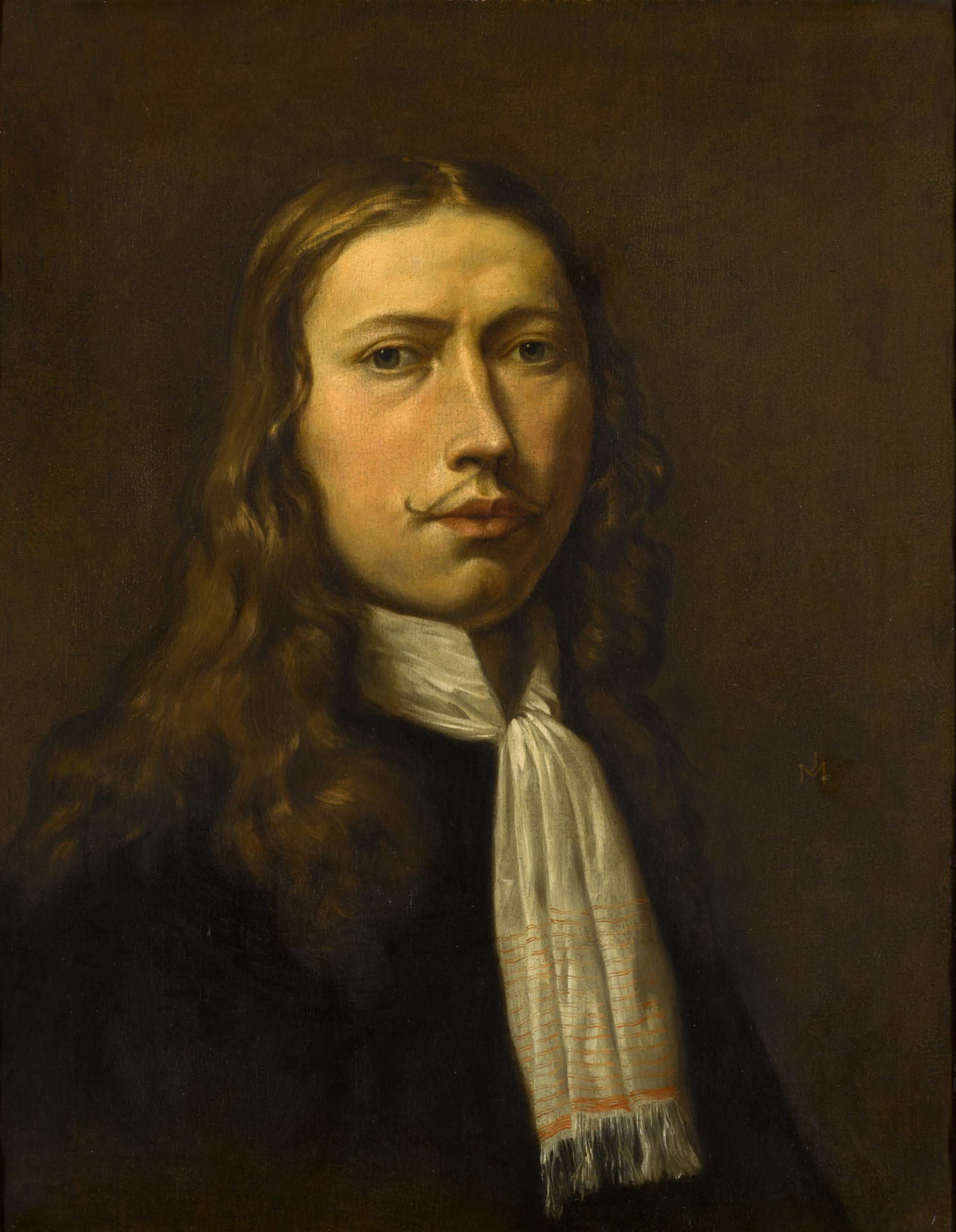
- Adriaen van de Velde
- Born: Baptized 30 November 1636; Amsterdam
- Died: 21 January 1672 (aged 35); Amsterdam
- Known for: Landscape art

Signature
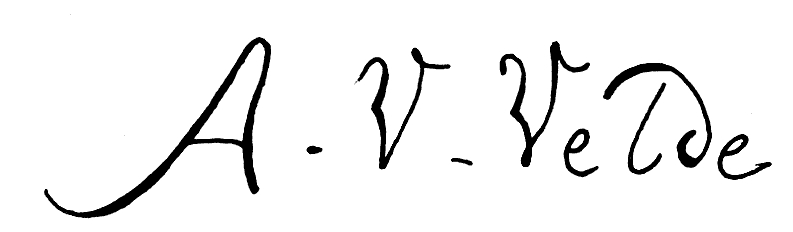

Adriaen van de Velde (bapt. 30 November 1636, in Amsterdam – bur. 21 January 1672, in Amsterdam), was a Dutch painter, draughtsman, and print artist. His favorite subjects were landscapes with animals and genre scenes. He also painted beaches, dunes, forests, winter scenes, portraits in landscapes, as well as mythological and biblical scenes. He belongs to a group of painters referred to as the Dutch Italianate painters, who combined Dutch agricultural landscapes with mythological or Arcadian scenes in Italian settings. His paintings are characterised by their delicate, careful composition and his mastery of lighting effects as well as the human figure.

== Life ==
Adriaen was born in Amsterdam where he was baptised in the Oude Kerk on 30 November 1636. He was the son of the marine painter Willem van de Velde the Elder and Judith Adriaens van Leeuwen. His brother Willem van de Velde the Younger was also a marine painter.

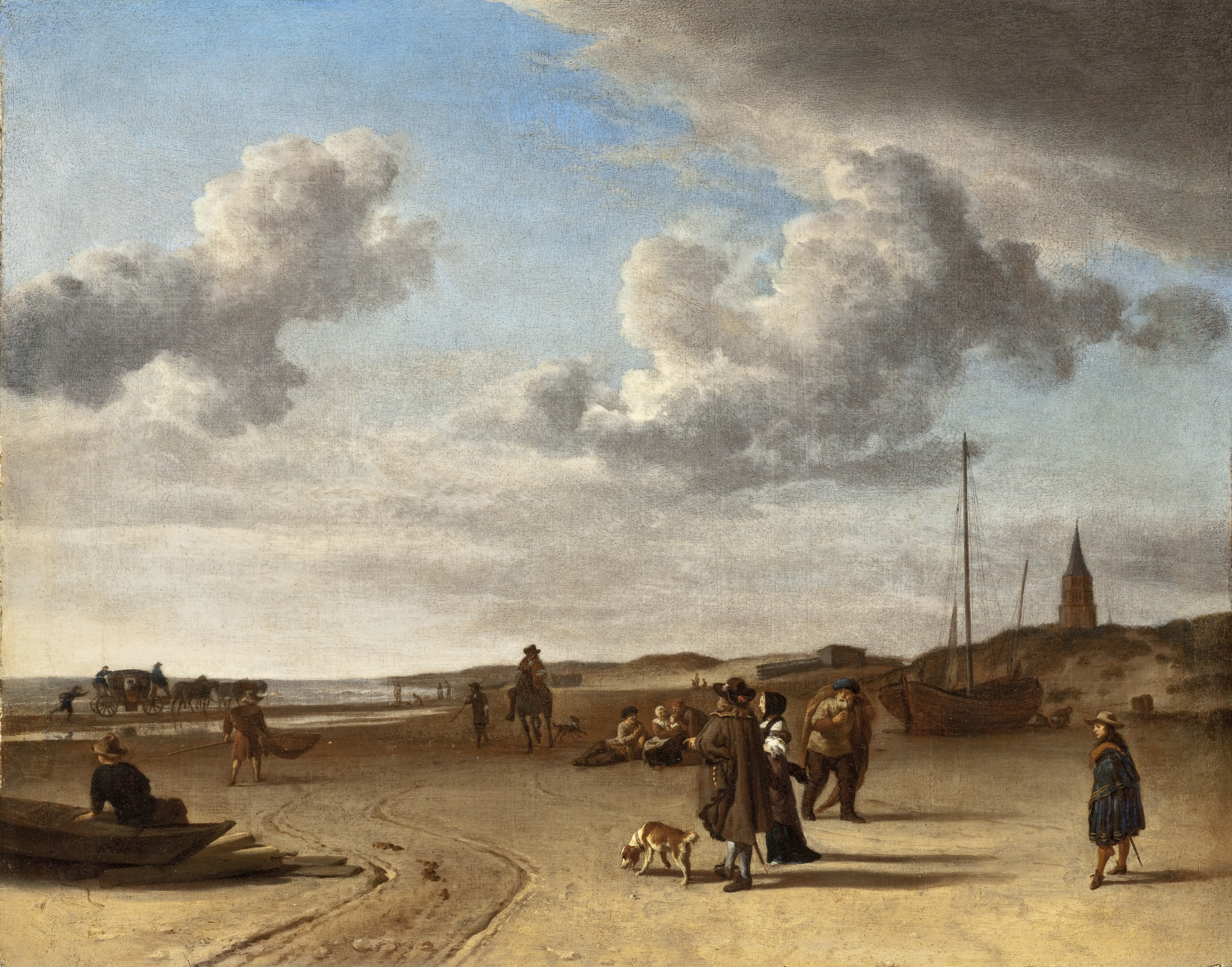
The beach near Scheveningen

He initially studied with his father. Not wishing to follow in the family tradition of marine painting, he decided to move to Haarlem to continue his study in the workshop of Jan Wynants, a landscape painter. In Haarlem he also met Philip Wouwerman and Paulus Potter, both animal painters who had an important influence on his work.

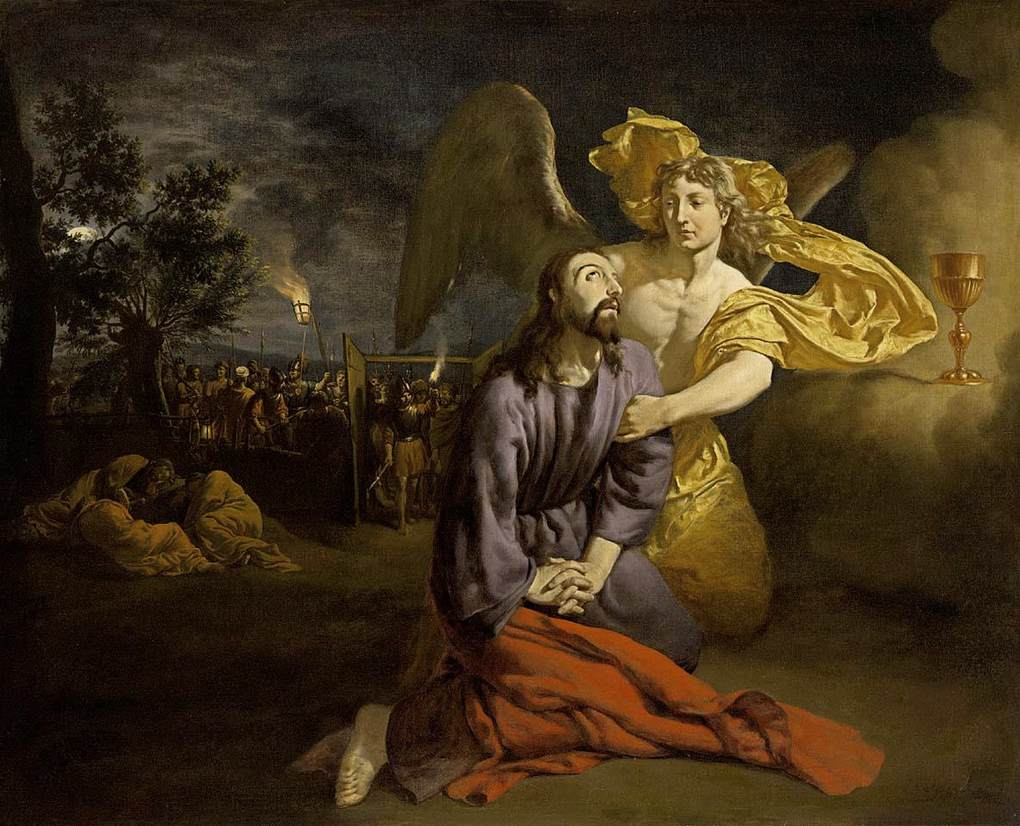
Agony in the garden

From 1657 he worked in Amsterdam where he married on 5 April 1657 Maria Pieters Oudekerck (or Ouderkerk), a Catholic. He converted to Catholicism even though its adherents suffered persecution and could only practise their faith in clandestine churches. All five of his children were baptized in such churches around Amsterdam. His daughter married the broker Sodyn in Amsterdam. She was the source for the Dutch biographer Arnold Houbraken's biographical sketch of her father. Van de Velde's career blossomed and he became one of the foremost landscape artists in the Dutch Republic.

He collaborated with other artists in Amsterdam typically adding the staffage or animals to their paintings. These artists included his master Wynants, Meindert Hobbema, Jacob Isaakszoon van Ruisdael, Adriaen Hendriksz Verboom, Philips Koninck, Jan van der Heyden and Frederik de Moucheron.

Despite his success as an artist, he was in dire straits throughout his life. His wife had to run a linen business to help make ends meet. When he died his possessions and works were auctioned off but the proceeds were insufficient to cover his debts.

His pupils included Johannes Innevelt, Johannes van der Bent, Dirck van Bergen and Jacob Coning.

== Work ==
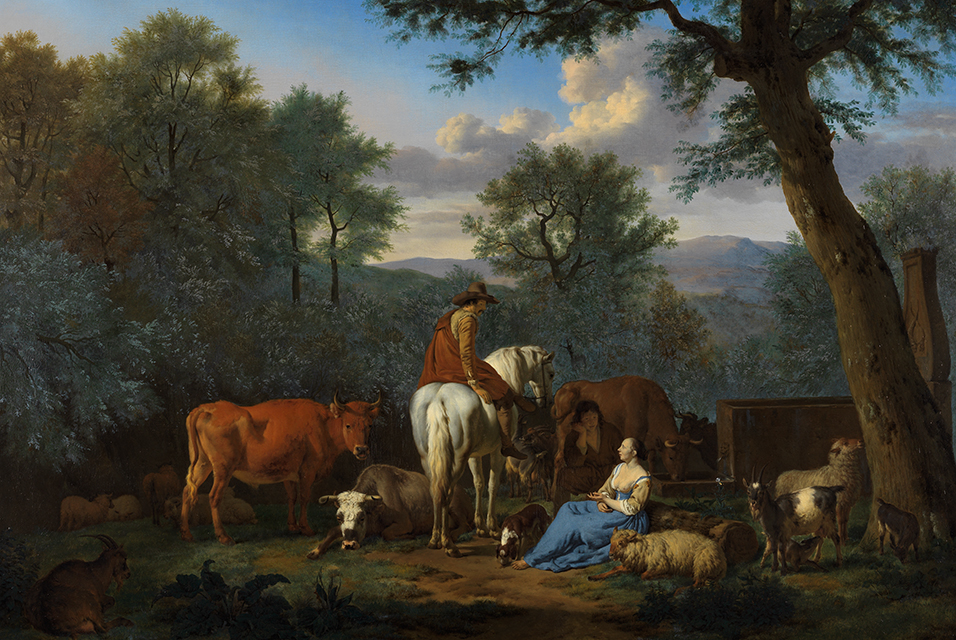
Couple in a landscape

Despite his short career, van de Velde created an extensive body of work of paintings, drawings and prints. His favorite subjects were meadows and Italianate views with herdsmen and cattle. He also painted beaches, dunes, forests, winter scenes, portraits in landscapes, as well as mythological and biblical scenes. Although primarily a painter of summer landscapes, he also depicted winter scenes and beaches. His early work with its tight, precise technique and hard, cool sunlight shows the influence of Paulus Potter. His mature style reveals the influence of Dutch Italianate painters such as Karel Dujardin, Nicolaes Berchem and Jan Asselijn. This is reflected in his handling of the soft sunlight and warm hues in his depictions of the Italian landscape.

He prepared his paintings meticulously by making preparatory drawings, many of which have been preserved. These drawings include sketches of landscapes, cattle in meadows and life figure studies. The many nude studies executed in red or black chalk are highlights of his oeuvre. He reused these studies in different compositions.

He also was active as an etcher. His earliest known works are a set of six etchings executed in 1653. His twenty-odd etchings depict mostly cattle in landscapes, occasionally with herders. These works were highly prized by collectors in his time.
