= Hendrick Mommers =

Dutch landscape painter

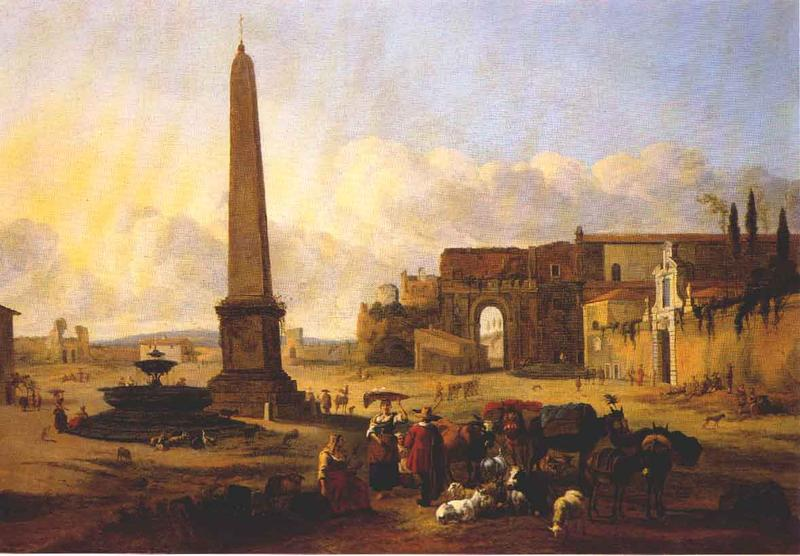
Piazza del Popolo, Rome

Hendrick Mommers (bapt. 2 January 1620, in Amsterdam – bur. 21 December 1693, in Amsterdam) was a Dutch Golden Age landscape painter.

== Biography ==
According to Houbraken, he was a Haarlem painter of vegetable market scenes, who was the first teacher of the young painter Dirk Maas, who later took lessons from the more famous landscape painter Nicolaes Berchem. Mommers died at the age of 74 in 1697. Houbraken also mentions Mommers in a poem about the Bentvueghels after the painter Dirk Visscher, who was called "Slempop". It is unclear if Houbraken intended to show that he had been Visscher's teacher if he had shared the "Slempop" nickname or if he was meant to be connected with another nickname, but Mommers did travel to Italy. Visscher is registered by the RKD as "Slempop" in Rome in 1707, or about the same time Houbraken was writing.

According to the RKD, Mommers became a member of the Haarlem Guild of Saint Luke in 1647, where he was last registered in 1665 when he appears to have moved to Amsterdam. He is registered as a Berchem follower and an Italy traveler (without a nickname). Dirk Maas was his pupil.
