= Willem van de Velde the Younger =

Dutch painter

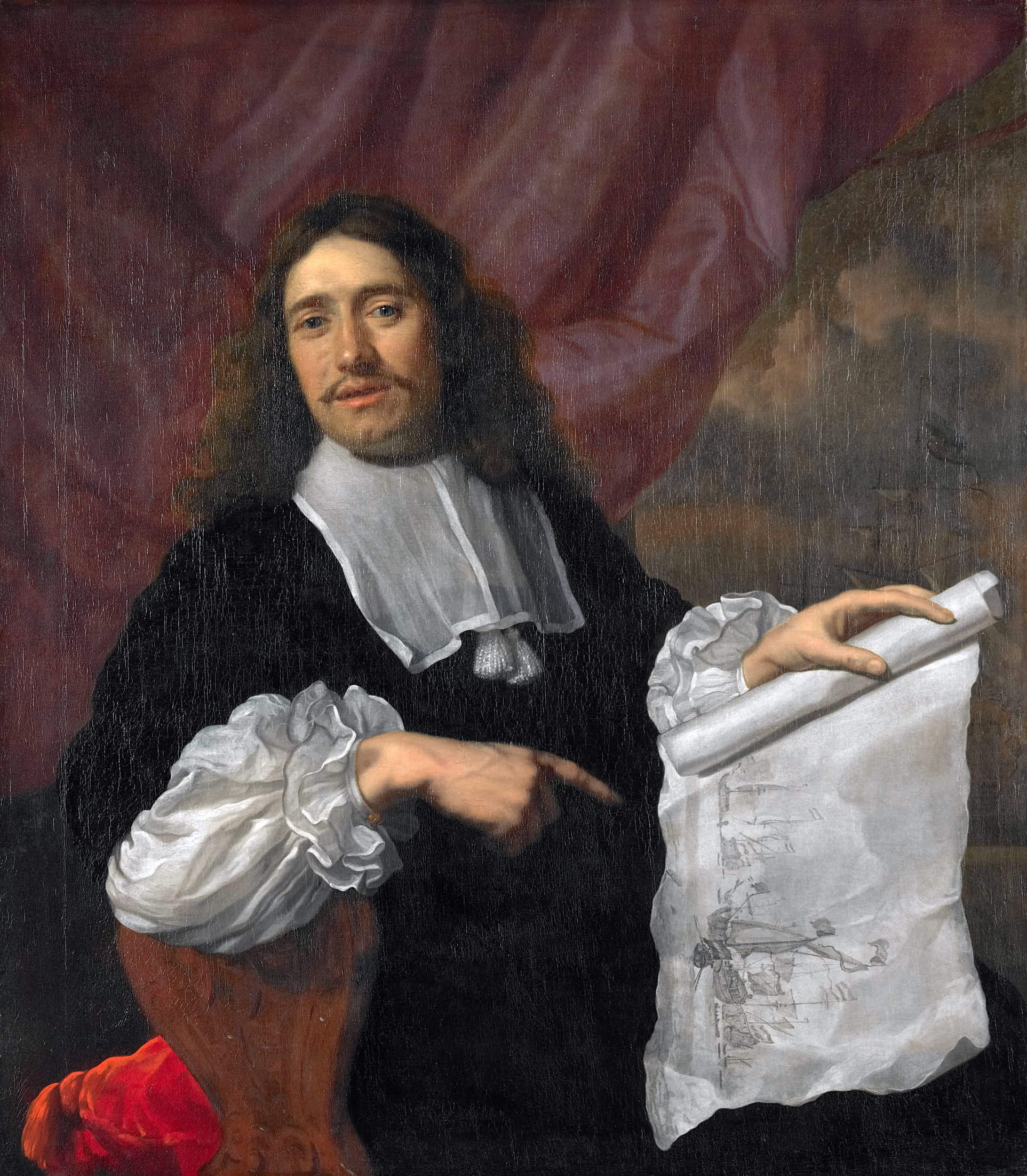
- Portrait by Lodewijk van der Helst, 1672
- Born: 18 December 1633 (baptised); Leiden, Dutch Republic
- Died: 6 April 1707 (aged 73); Greenwich, London
- Known for: Marine art

Signature
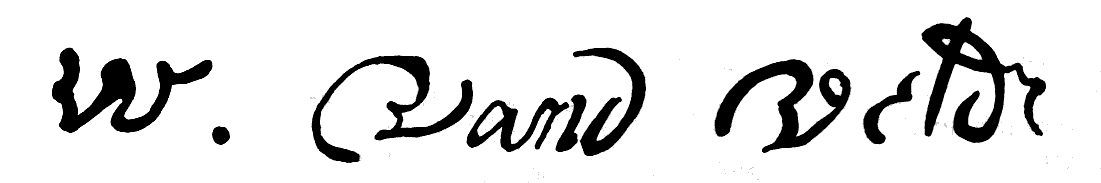

Willem van de Velde the Younger (18 December 1633 (baptised) – 6 April 1707) was a Dutch painter who specialised in marine art. He was the son of Willem van de Velde the Elder, who also specialised in marine art. His brother, Adriaen van de Velde, was a landscape painter.

== Biography ==
Willem van de Velde was baptised on 18 December 1633 in Leiden, Holland, Dutch Republic. He was instructed by his father, and around 1650 by Simon de Vlieger, a marine painter of repute at the time, who worked around Weesp. He was also influenced by the work of the Dutch artist Jan van de Cappelle, who excelled at painting cloudy skies, the clouds often being reflected in the calm waters.

Willem was married twice. In 1652, he married Petronella Le Maire of Weesp. The pair was married for a mere fifteen months, and in 1653 Van de Velde began proceedings to separate from his wife. At that time, he lived at Buitenkant and likely had a view on the harbour and the Amsterdam Admiralty. From 1655 one of his neighbors was Michiel de Ruyter, a Dutch Navy Officer. In 1656 he married Magdalena Walravens, the daughter of a skipper. The couple had four children and the last one was baptized at Zuiderkerk in 1674. He achieved great celebrity by his art before he came to London.

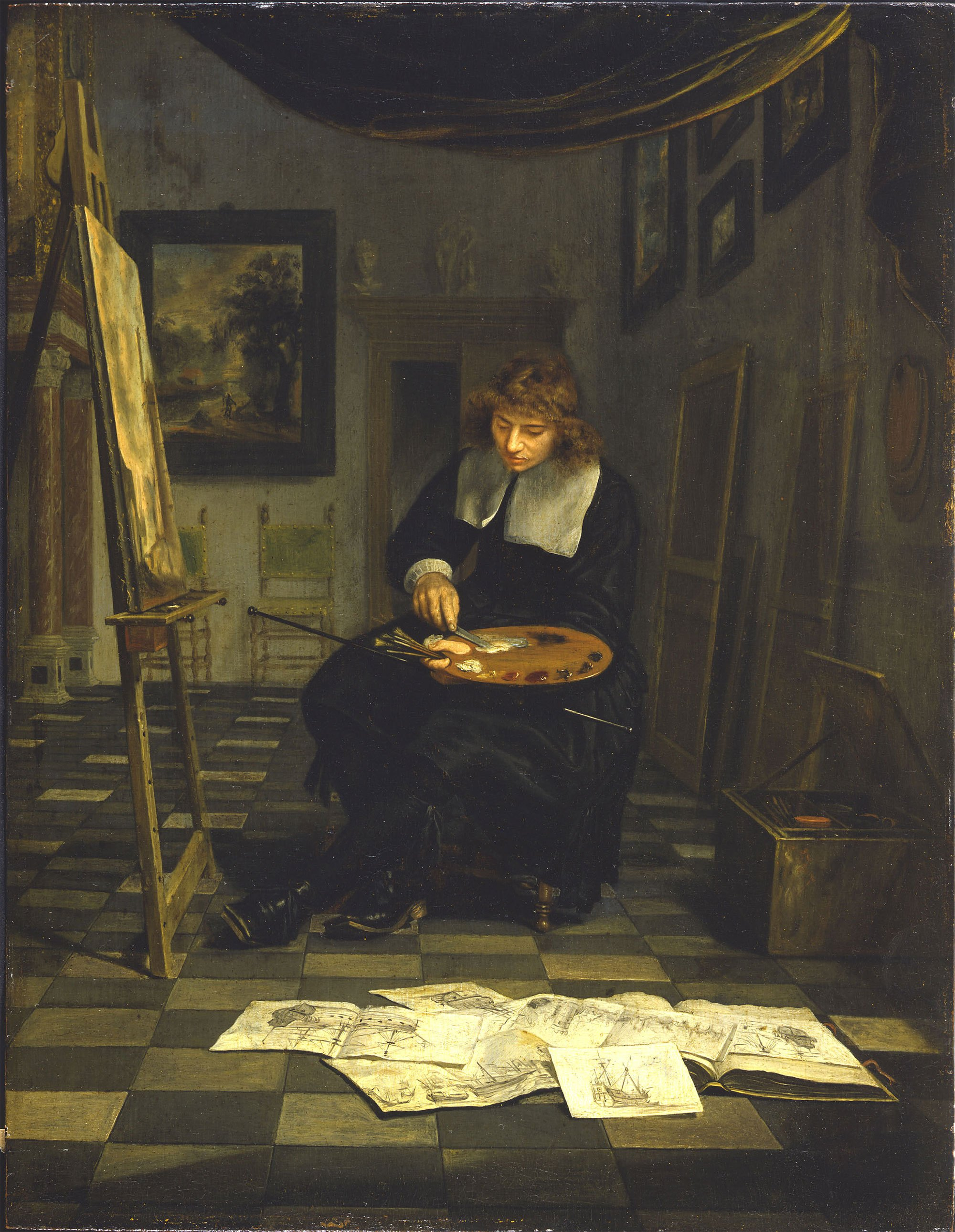
Portrait of Van de Velde in his studio by Michiel van Musscher

The younger Van de Velde collaborated with his father, an experienced draughtsman, who prepared studies of the battles, events and seascapes in black and white (ink paintings), while the son used oil paints. Father and son were driven from the Netherlands by the political and economic conditions which resulted from war with the French, and moved to England. Here they were engaged by Charles II, both at a salary of £100, the Younger to aid his father in "taking and making draughts of sea-fights", his part of the work being to reproduce in color the drawings of the elder Van de Velde. He was also patronized by the Duke of York and by various members of the nobility.

He died on 6 April 1707 in Westminster, England, and was buried at St James's Church, Piccadilly. A memorial to him and his father lies within the church.

== Works ==
Most of Van de Velde's finest works represent views off the coast of Holland, with Dutch shipping. His best productions are delicate, spirited and finished in handling, and correct in the drawing of the vessels and their rigging. The numerous figures are tellingly introduced, and the artist is successful in his renderings of sea, whether in calm or storm. The ships are portrayed with almost photographic accuracy, and are the most precise guides available to the appearance of 17th-century ships.

Substantial collections of Van de Velde's paintings and drawings are held in the National Gallery, National Maritime Museum and the Wallace Collection, all in London; the Rijksmuseum in Amsterdam; and the National Gallery of Art in Washington DC.

One of his works, Dutch men-o'-war and other shipping in a calm, achieved in 2011 the record auction price of US$9,226,332, at Christie's London. Additionally, Willem van de Velde II’s paintings have been featured in numerous key galleries and museums, such as Kunsthaus Zürich.

=== Gallery ===
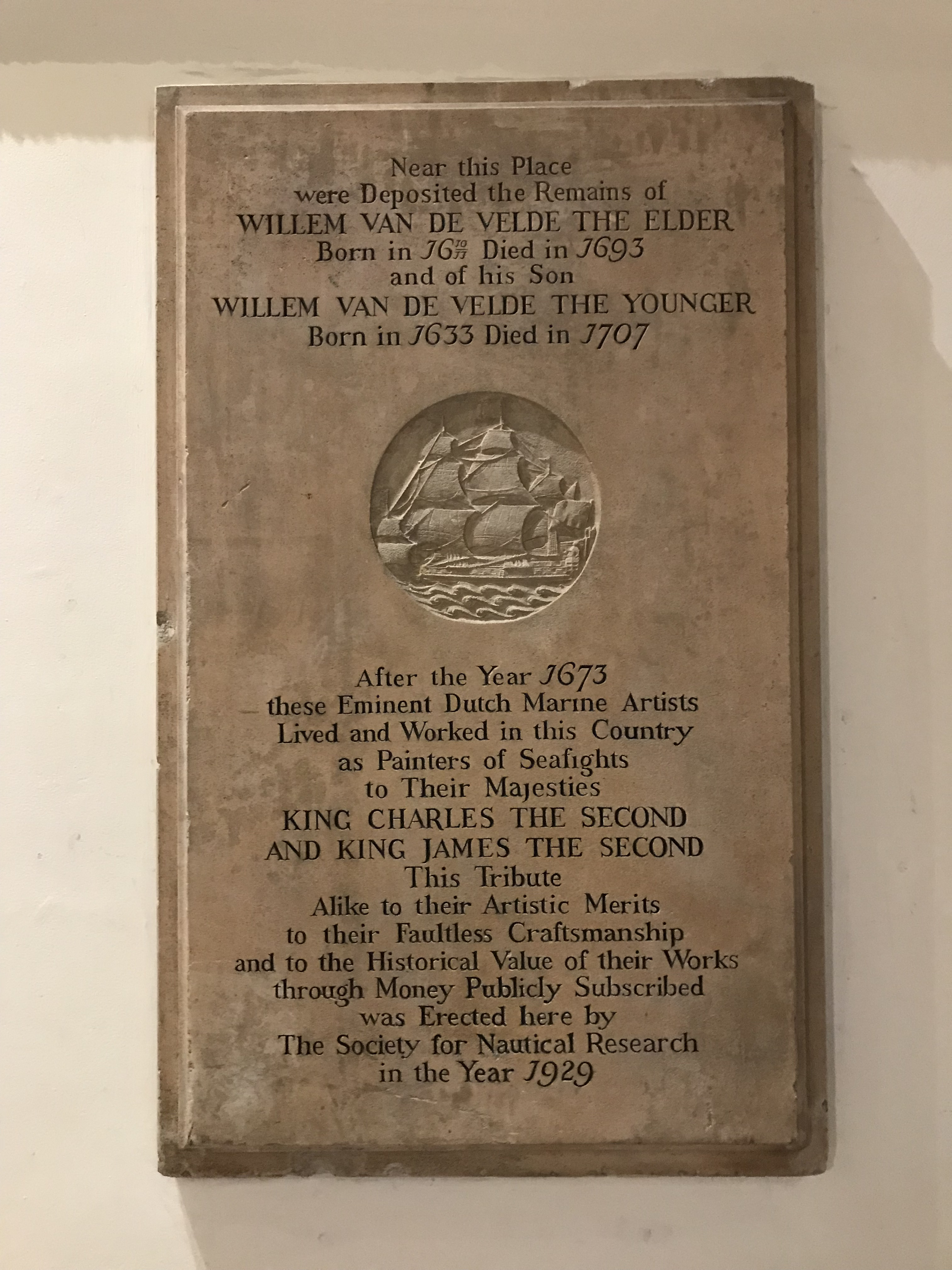
A memorial to Willem van de Velde the Older and the Younger in St James's Church, Piccadilly.

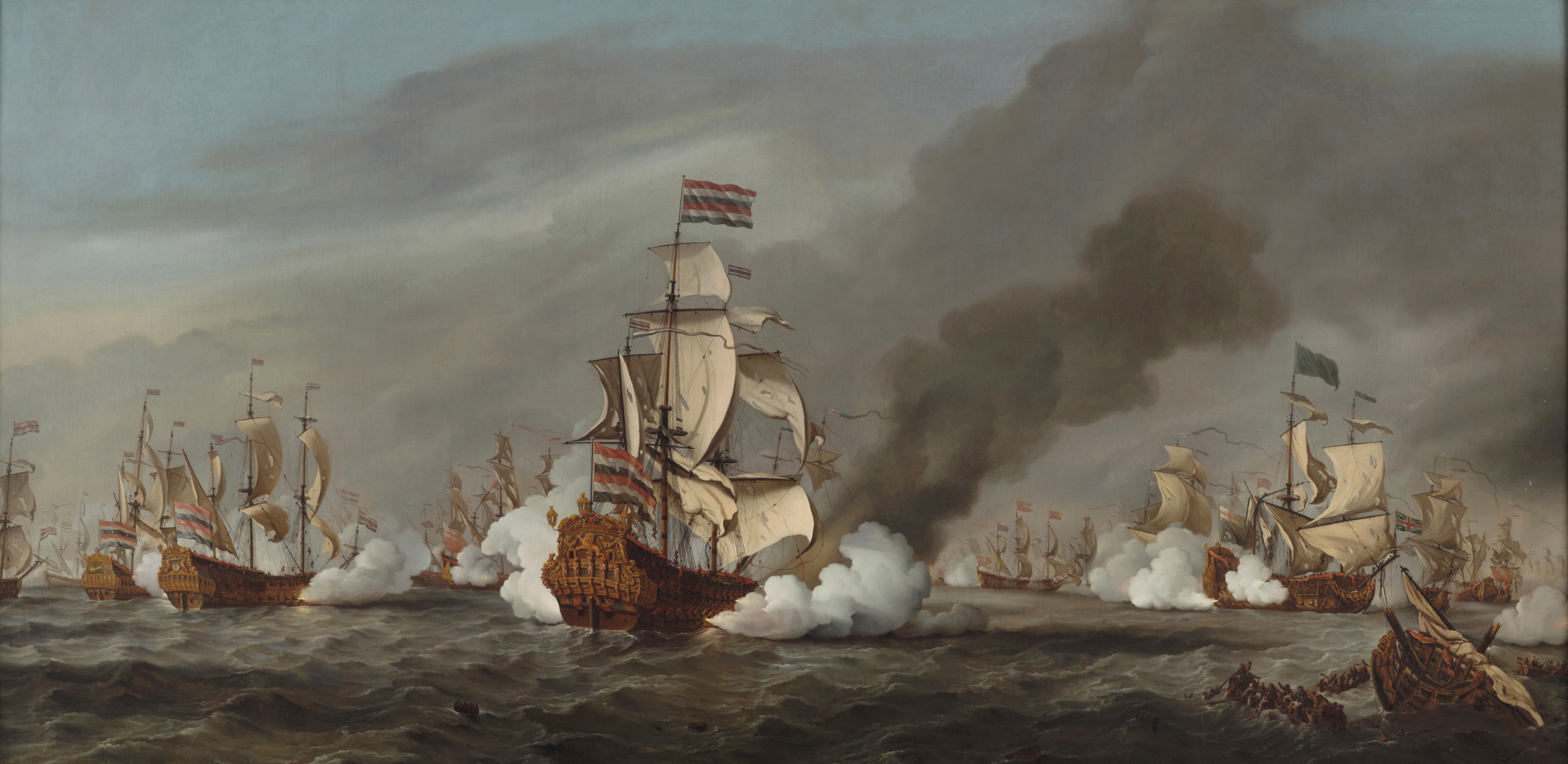
The Battle of Texel, painted 1687

The burning of the Royal James at the Battle of Solebay

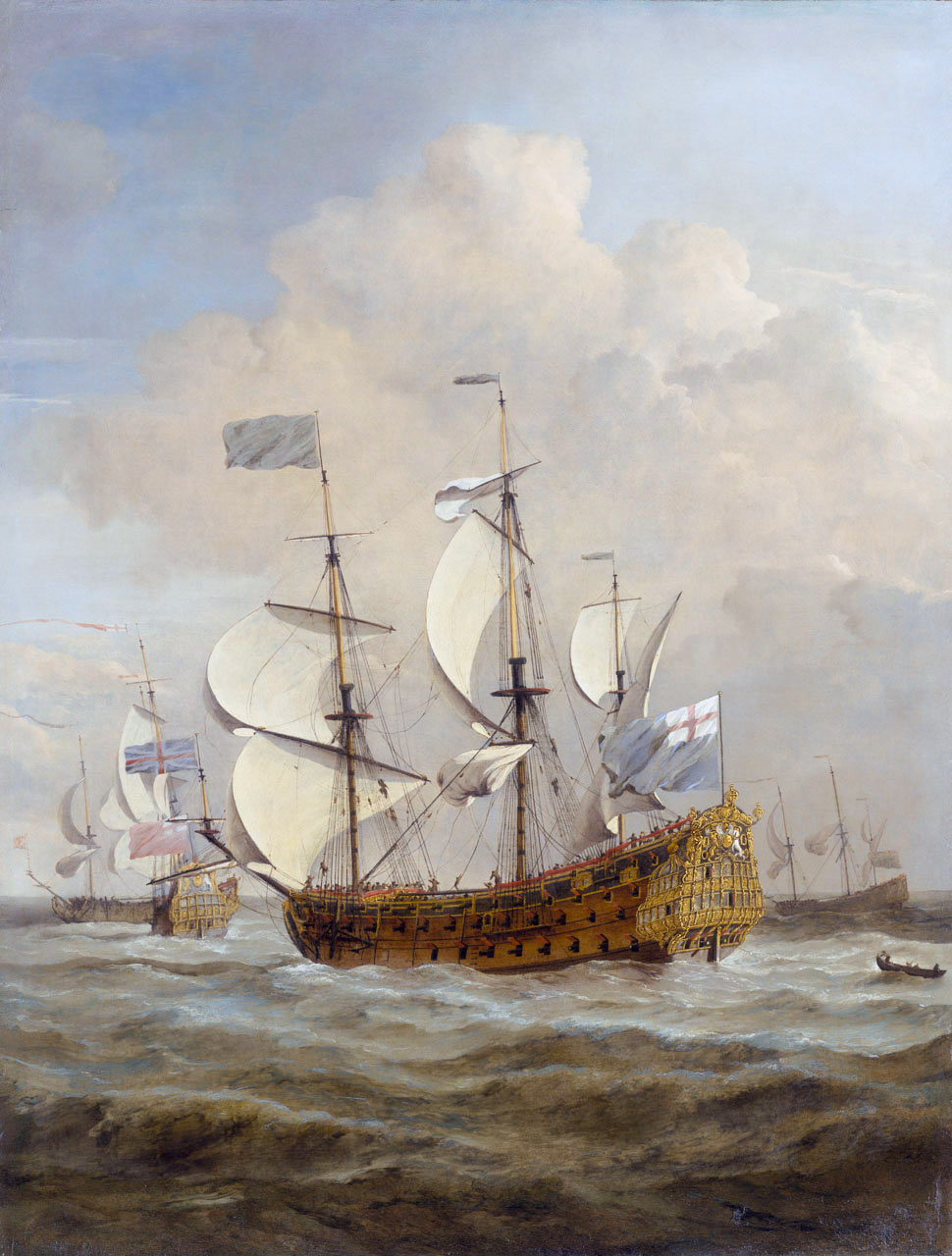
HMS St Andrew at sea in a moderate breeze, painted c. 1673

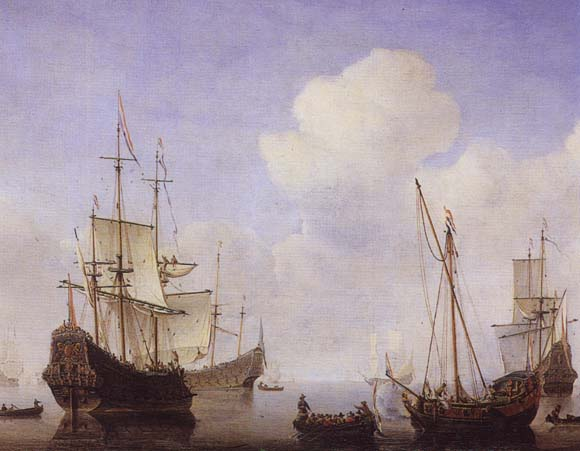
Ships riding quietly at anchor c. 1670s

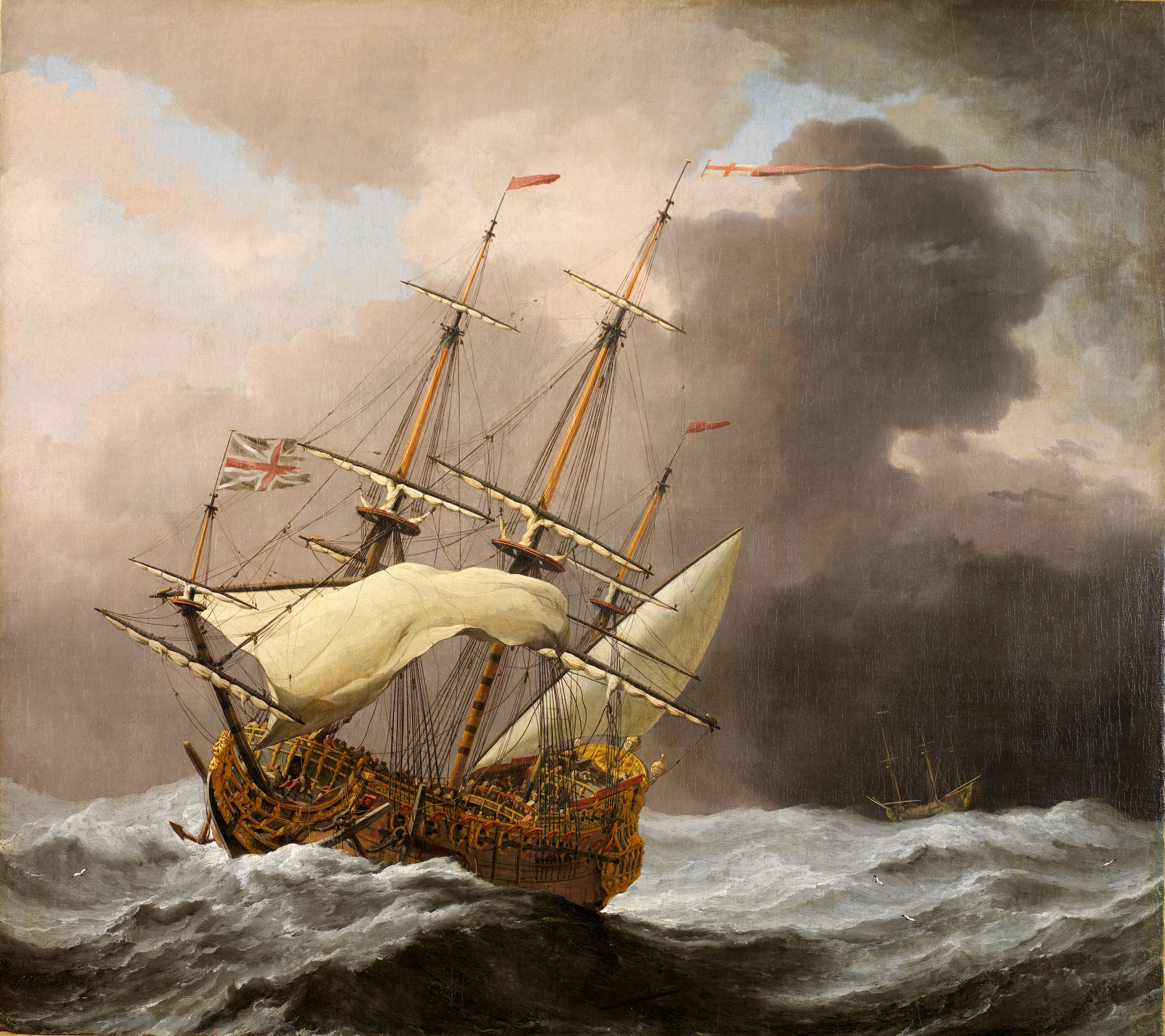
The English Ship Hampton Court in a Gale c. 1680s

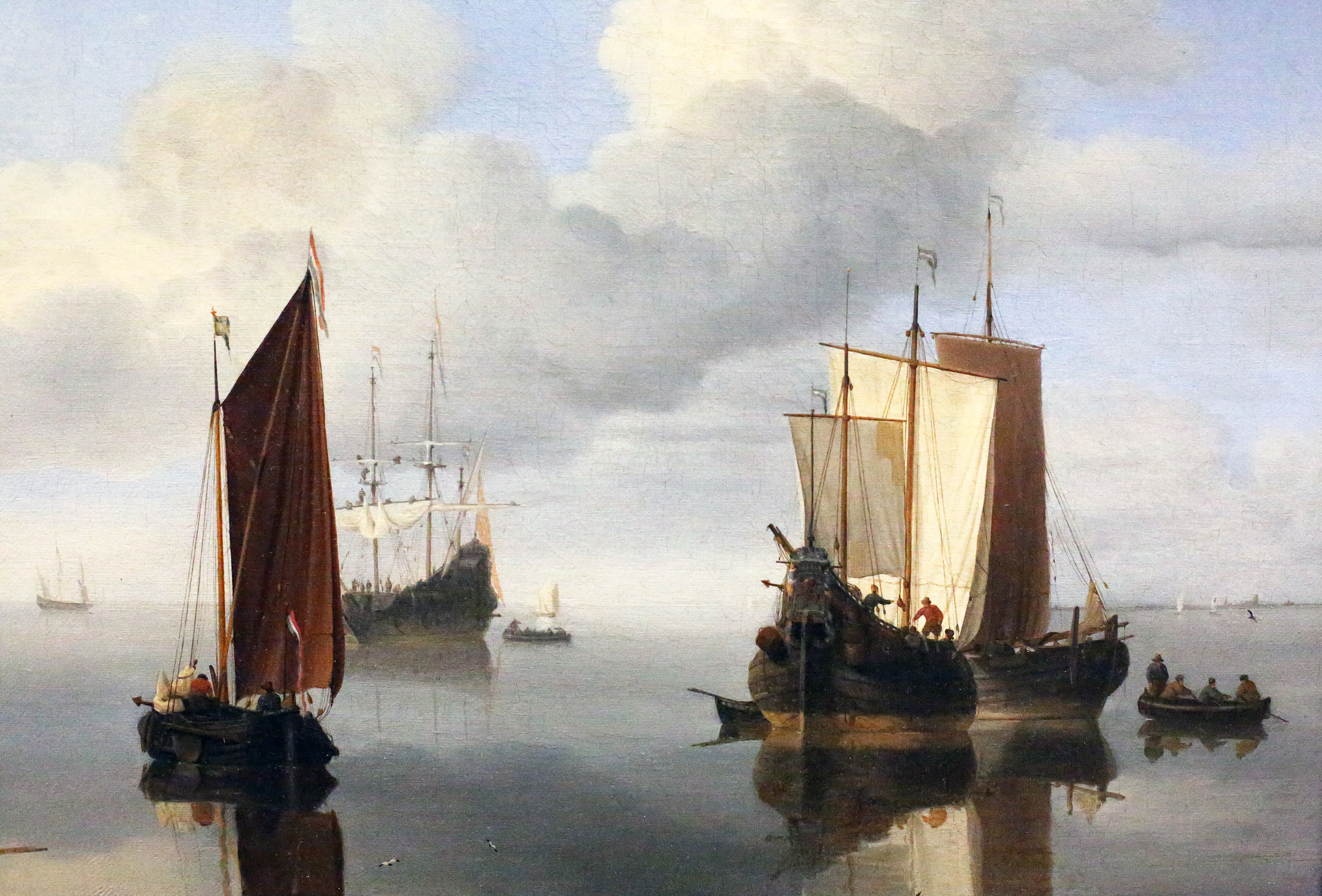
Calm: Fishing Boats Under Sail c. 1655-60

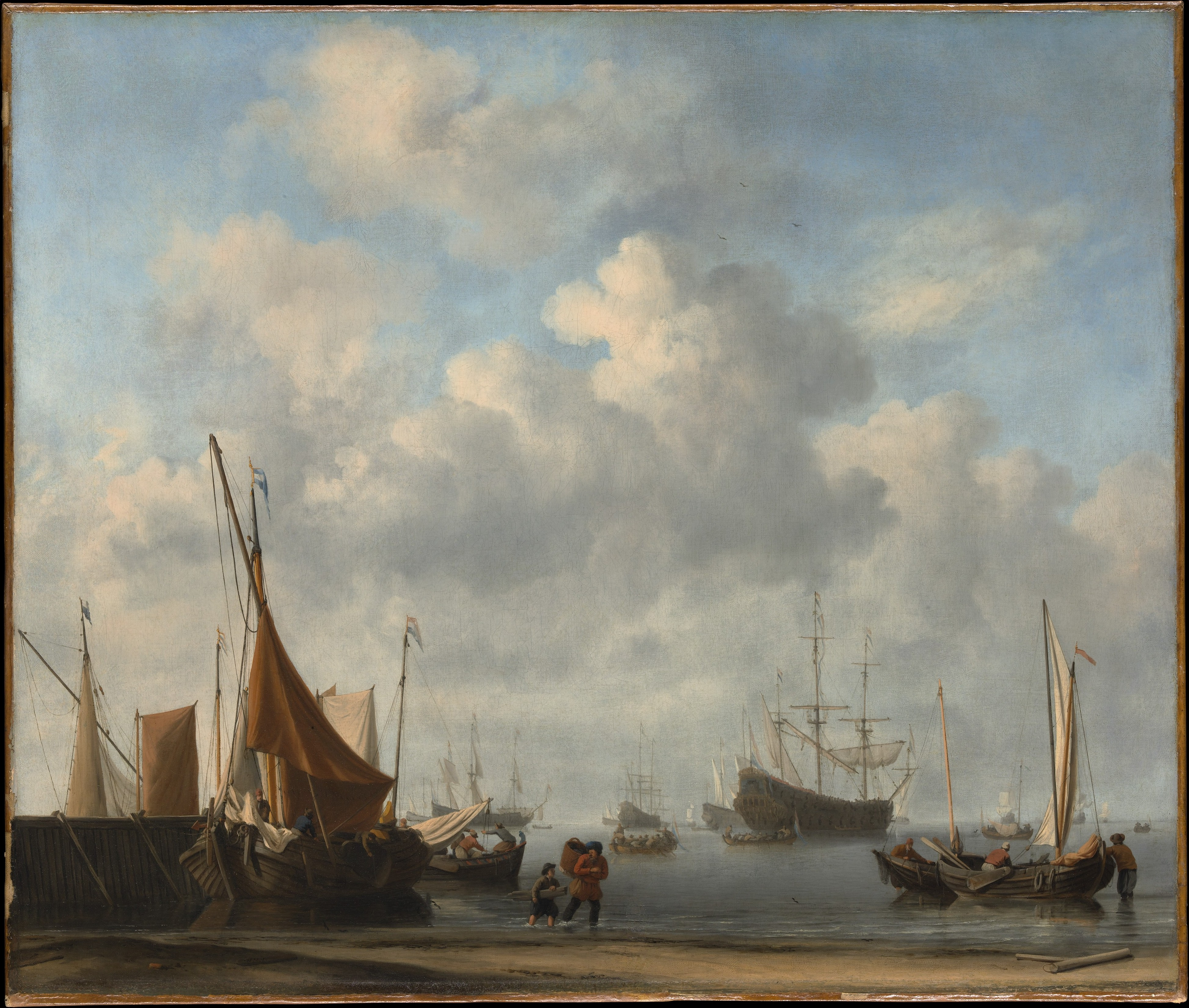
Entrance to a Dutch Port, c. 1665, Metropolitan Museum of Art

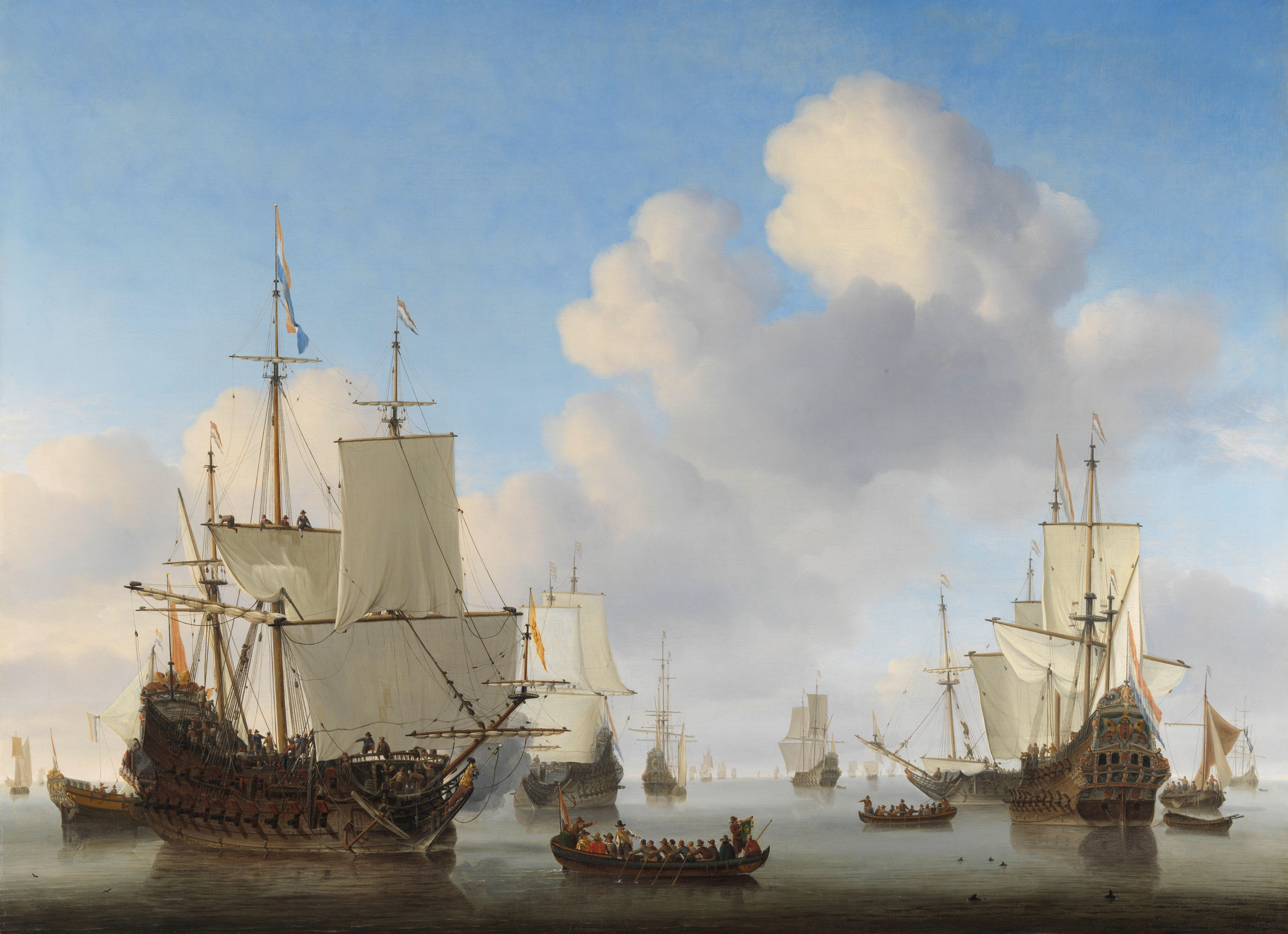
Dutch Ships in a Calm Sea, c. 1665, Rijksmuseum Amsterdam

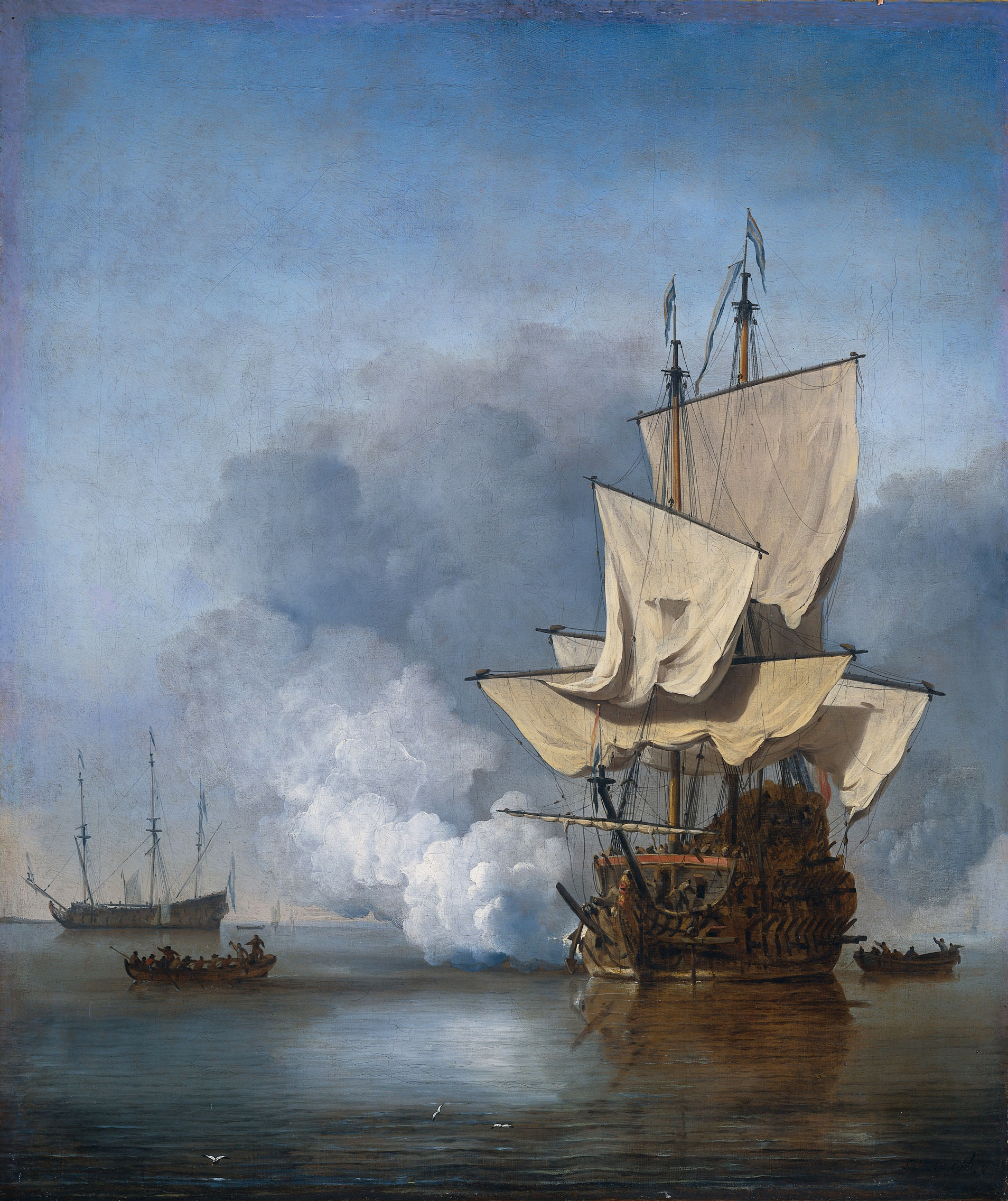
The cannon shot

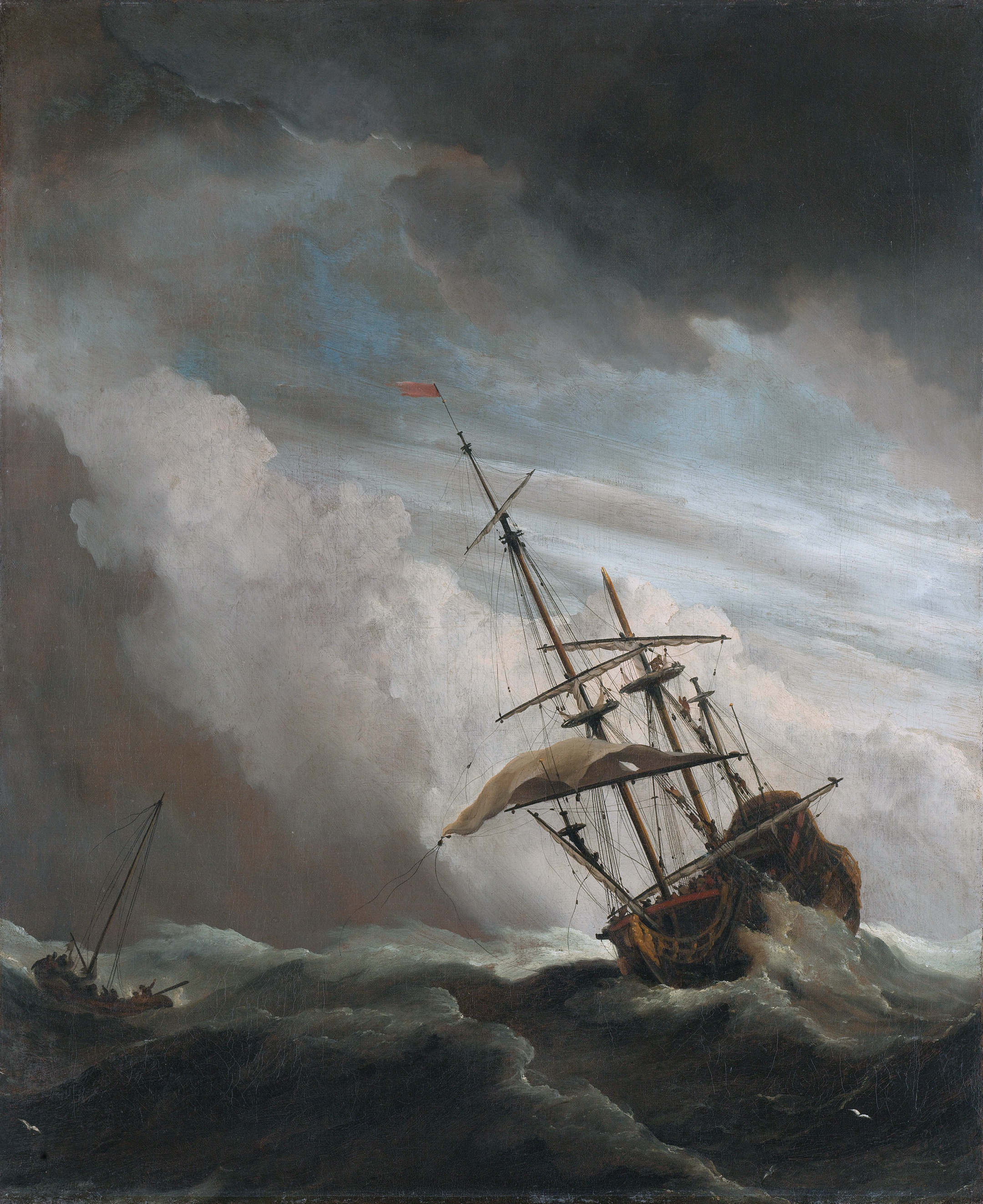
The gust (c. 1680), in the collection of the Rijksmuseum
