= Nicolaes Pieterszoon Berchem =

Dutch painter (1620–1683)

Nicolaes Berchem
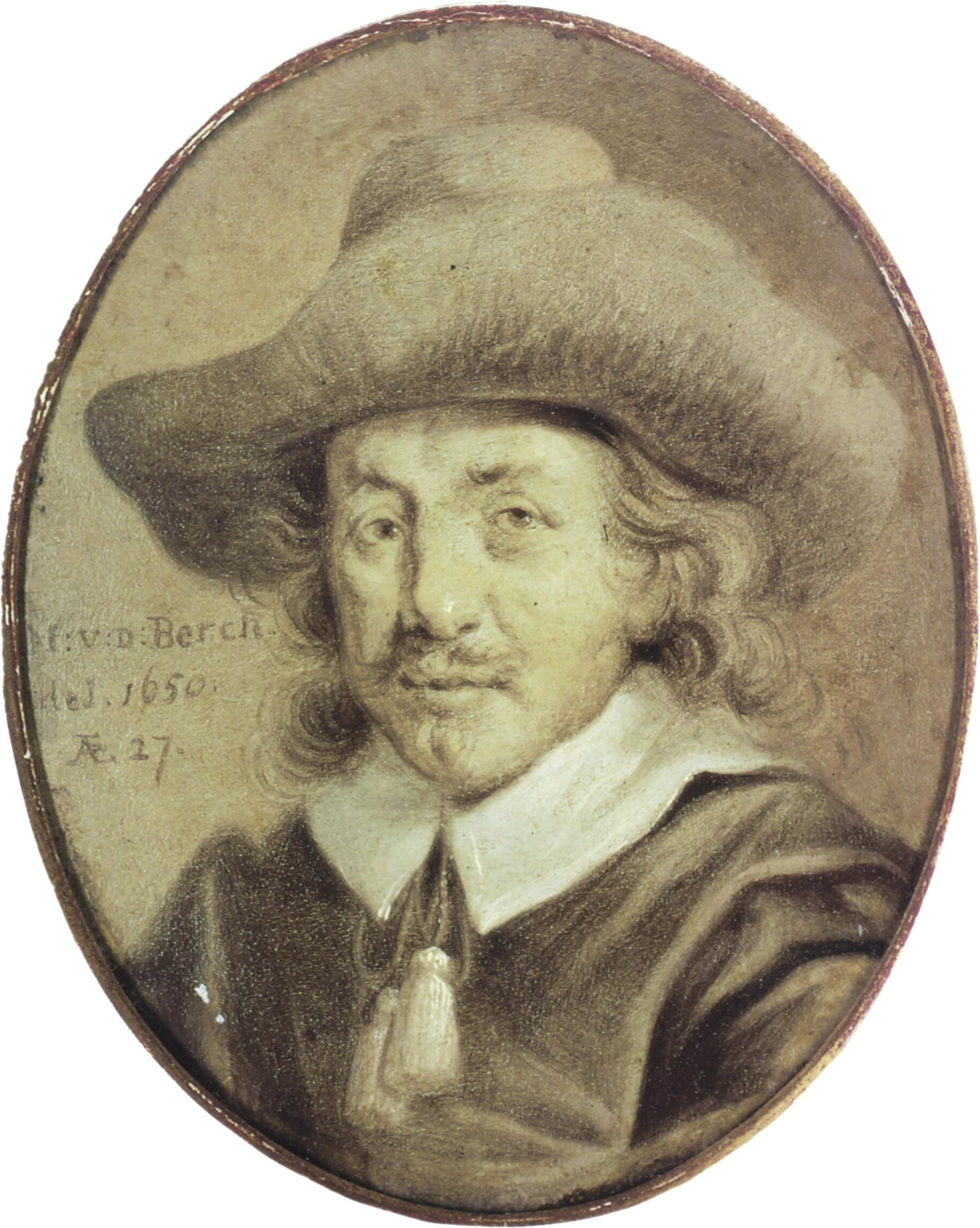
- Portrait of Nicolaes Berchem by Jan Stolker
- Born: Nicolaes Pieterszoon Berchem; 1 October 1620; Haarlem, Dutch Republic
- Died: 18 February 1683 (aged 62); Amsterdam, Dutch Republic
- Movement: Dutch Golden Age; Dutch Italianate
- Spouse: Catrijne Claesdr. de Groot
- Children: Nicolaes Berchem the Younger (1649-1672)

Signature
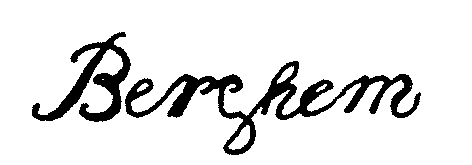

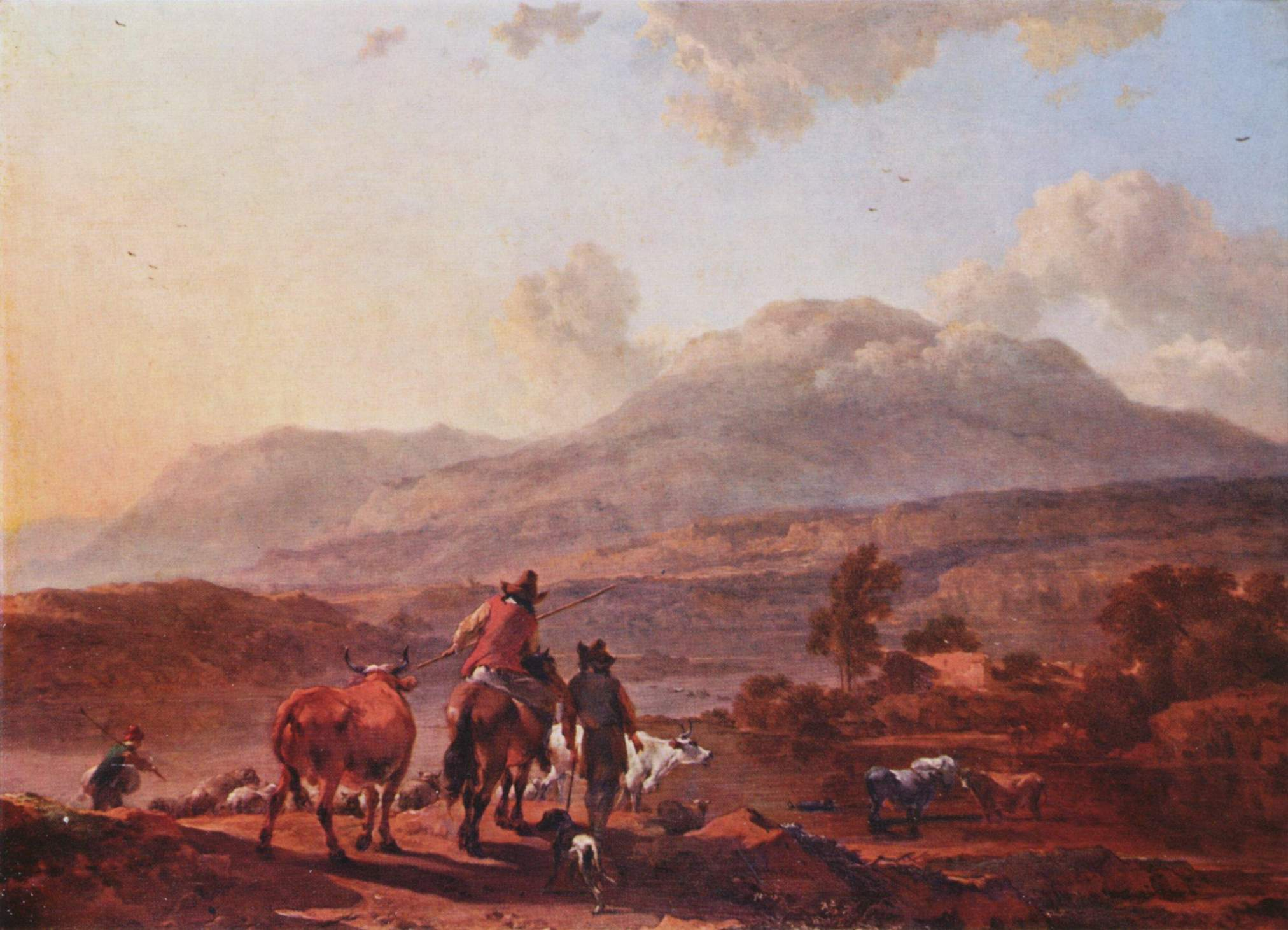
An Italian evening scene

Nicolaes Pieterszoon Berchem (1 October 1620 – 18 February 1683) was a highly esteemed and prolific Dutch Golden Age painter of pastoral landscapes, populated with mythological or biblical figures, but also of a number of allegories and genre pieces.

He was a member of the second generation of "Dutch Italianate landscape" painters. These were artists who travelled to Italy, or aspired to, in order to soak up the romanticism of the country, bringing home sketchbooks full of drawings of classical ruins and pastoral imagery.

His paintings, of which he produced an immense number, (Hofstede de Groot claimed around 850, although many are misattributed), were in great demand, as were his 80 etchings and 500 drawings. His landscapes, painted in the Italian style of idealized rural scenes, with hills, mountains, cliffs and trees in a golden dawn are sought after. Berchem also painted inspired and attractive human and animal figures (staffage) in works of other artists, like Allaert van Everdingen, Jan Hackaert, Gerrit Dou, Meindert Hobbema and Willem Schellinks.

== Biography ==
Born in Haarlem, he received instruction from his father Pieter Claesz, and from the painters Jan van Goyen, Pieter de Grebber, Jan Baptist Weenix, Jan Wils and Claes Cornelisz Moeyaert. According to Houbraken, Carel de Moor told him that Berchem got his name from two words "Berg hem" for "Save him!", an expression used by his fellows in Van Goyen's workshop whenever his father chased him there with the intent to beat him. No trip or Grand Tour by Berchem was documented by Houbraken though he mentioned another story about the "Berg hem!" nickname which came from Berchem's conscription as a sailor; the man in charge of impressment knew him and sent him ashore with the words "Save him!". Today his name is assumed to come from his father's hometown of Berchem, Antwerp. According to the RKD he traveled to Italy with Jan Baptist Weenix, whom he called his cousin, in 1642–1645. Works by him are signed both as "CBerghem" and "Berchem".

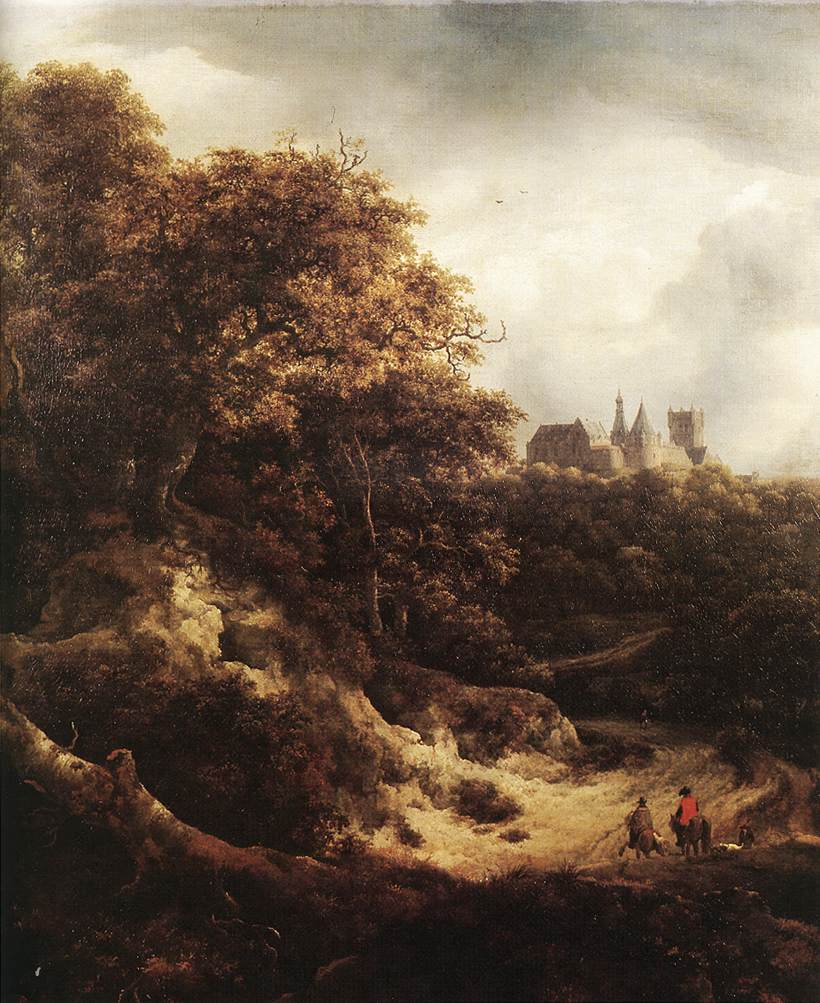
A View of Burg Bentheim (1651) by Jacob van Ruisdael

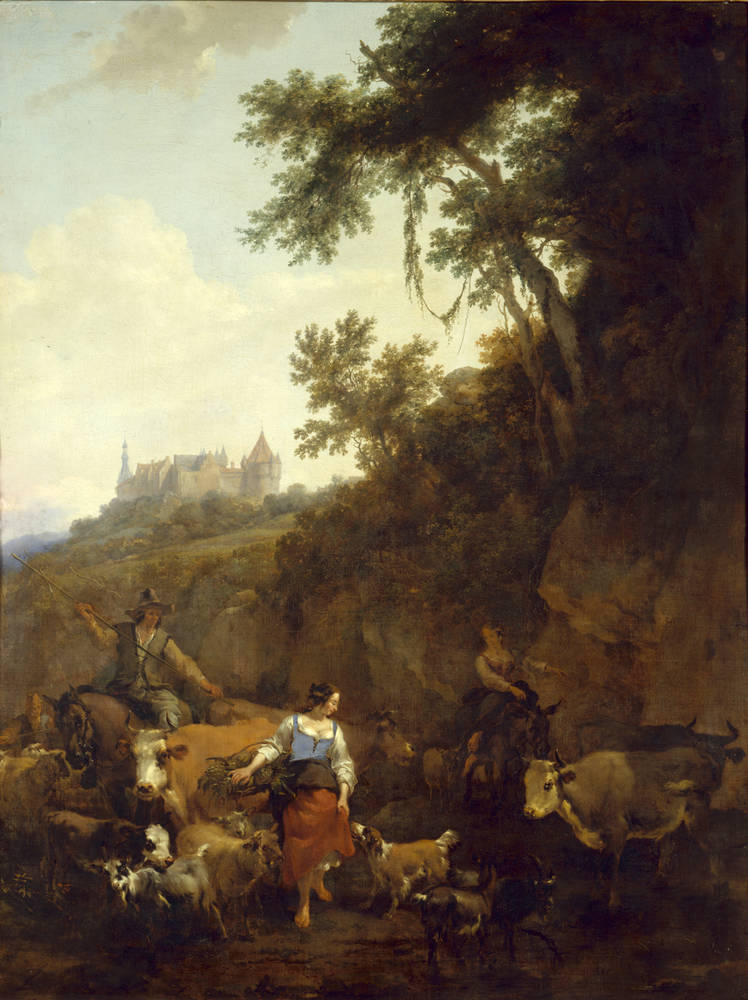
A View of Burg Bentheim (c. 1656) Nicolaas Berchem

In 1645 he became a member of the Dutch reformed church and married the year after. According to Houbraken he married the daughter of the painter Jan Wils, who kept him on a short allowance, but to finance his collection of prints he would borrow money from his pupils and colleagues and pay them back from the proceeds of paintings that he didn't tell her about. Around 1650 he travelled to Westphalia with Jacob van Ruisdael, where a dated piece showing Burg Bentheim is recorded. Maybe Berchem went to Italy after this trip and before he moved to Amsterdam – he is not clearly documented in the Netherlands between 1650 and 1656. Around 1660 he worked for the engraver Jan de Visscher designing an atlas. From 1661 to 1670 he is registered in Amsterdam and in 1670 he moved back to Haarlem, but was living back in Amsterdam by 1677, where he died in 1683.

He was a popular teacher and his pupils were Abraham Begeyn, Johannes van der Bent, his son Nicolaes, Isaack Croonenbergh, Simon Dubois, Karel Dujardin, Johannes Glauber, Pieter de Hooch, Jacob van Huchtenburg, Justus van Huysum, Dirk Maas, Hendrick Mommers, Jacob Ochtervelt, Willem Romeyn and possibly Jan Frans Soolmaker. He was the uncle of Govert van der Leeuw and his brother Pieter.

The French Rococo painter Jean-Baptiste Pillement was influenced by his works, as was the Dutch 'Cleves Romanticism' landscape painter, Barend Cornelis Koekkoek.

== Gallery ==
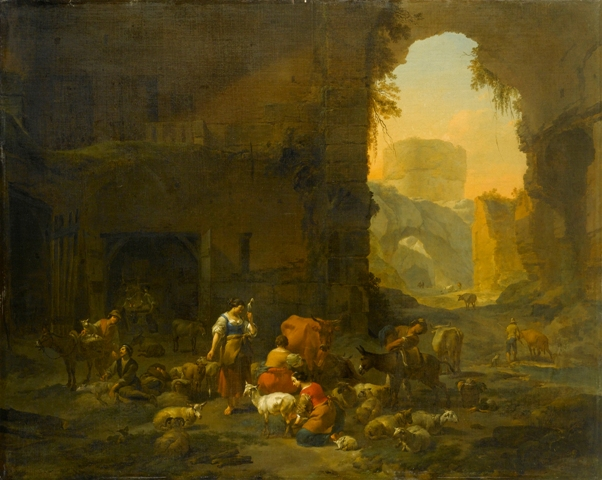
Milkmaids and Shepherds with their Flock at the Mouth of a Grotto, a Drover Watering his Cattle beyond, oil on canvas, 1665

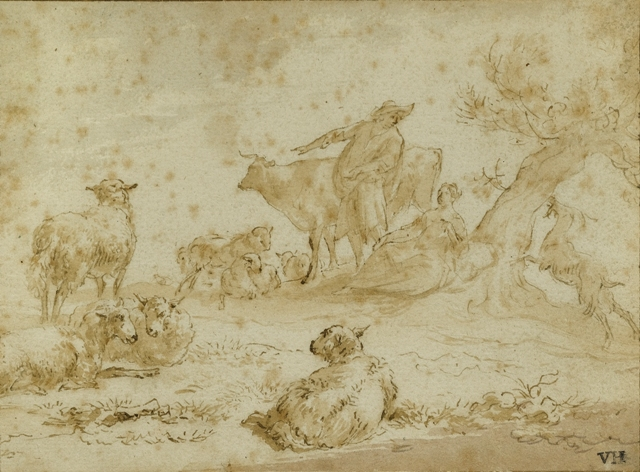
A Peasant Couple by a Tree with Cattle and Sheep, pen and brown ink, brown wash

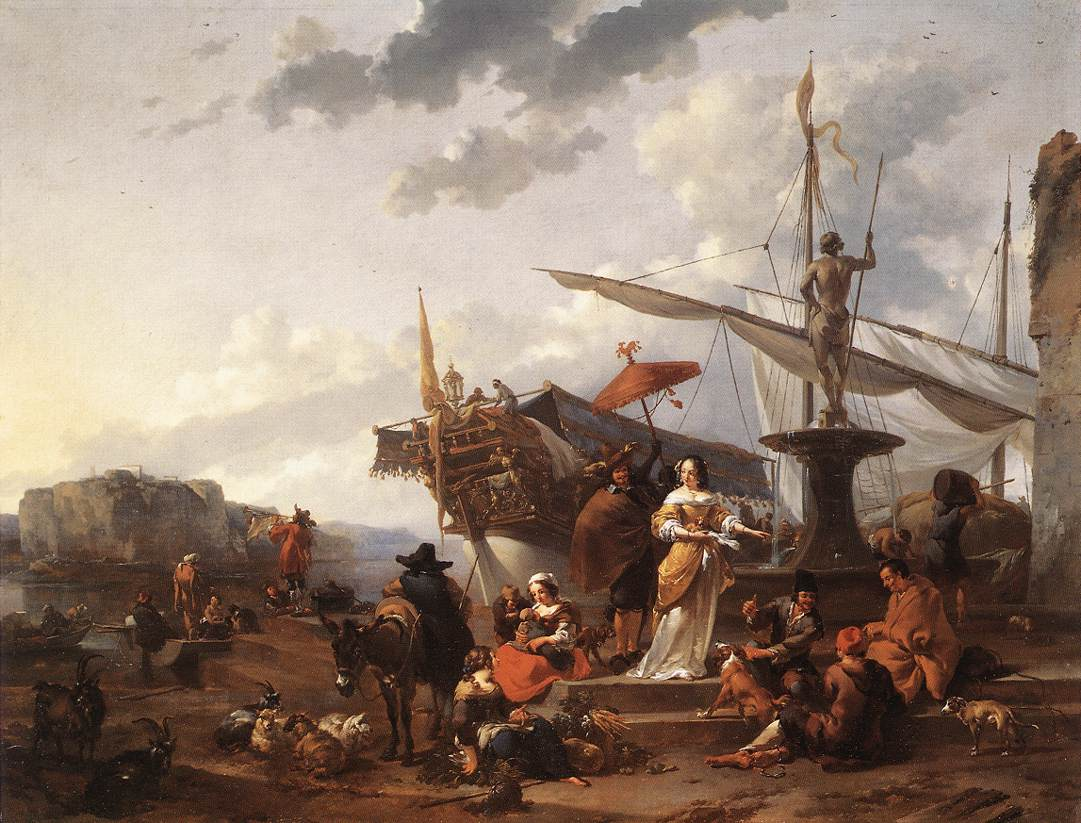
A Southern Harbour Scene, ca. 1657–1659

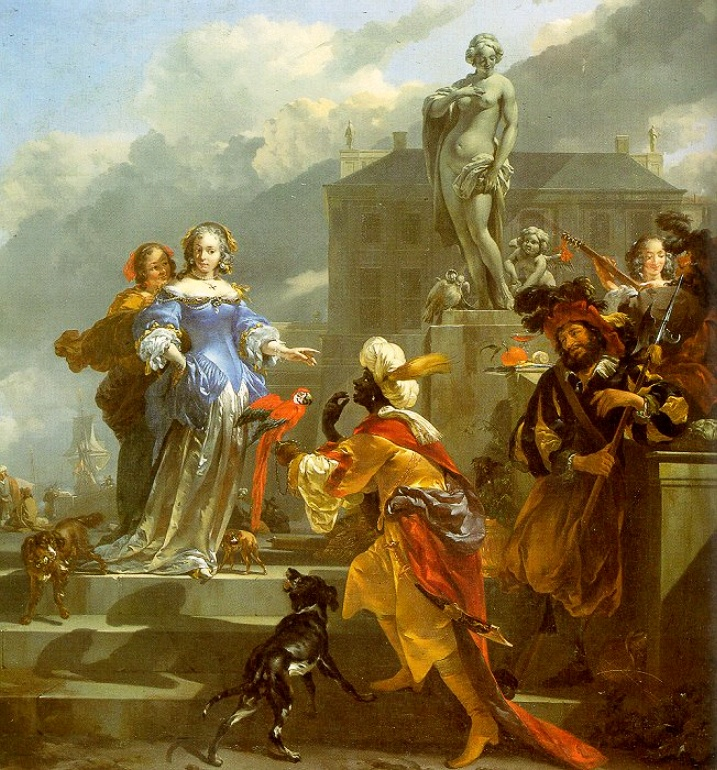
A Moor Presenting a Parrot to a Lady, ca. 1655

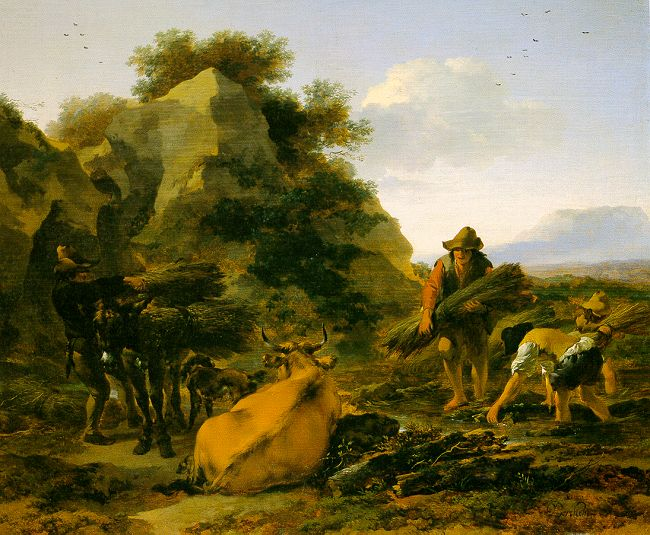
Landscape with Herdsmen Gathering Sticks, early 1650s

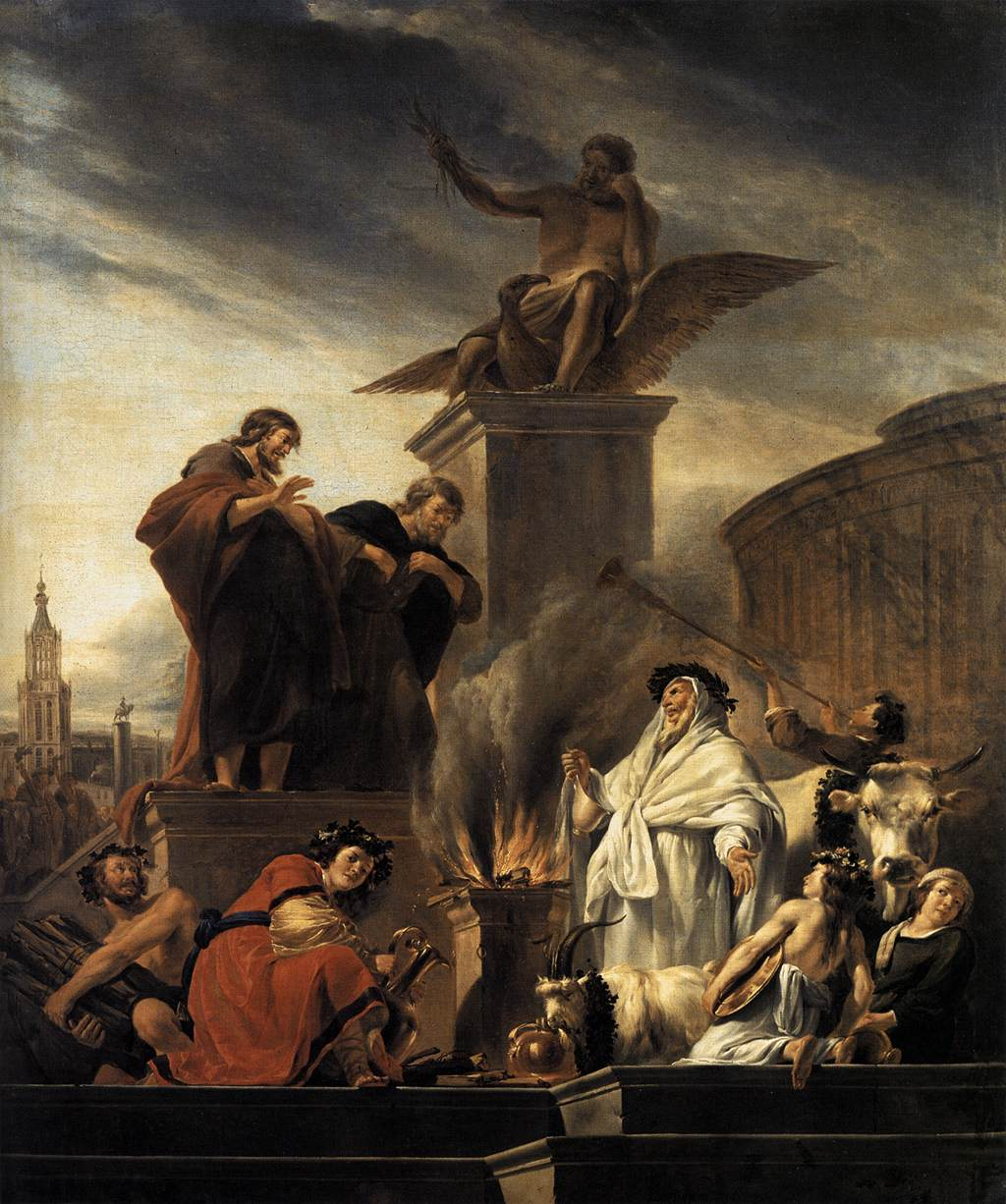
Paul and Barnabas at Lystra, 1650

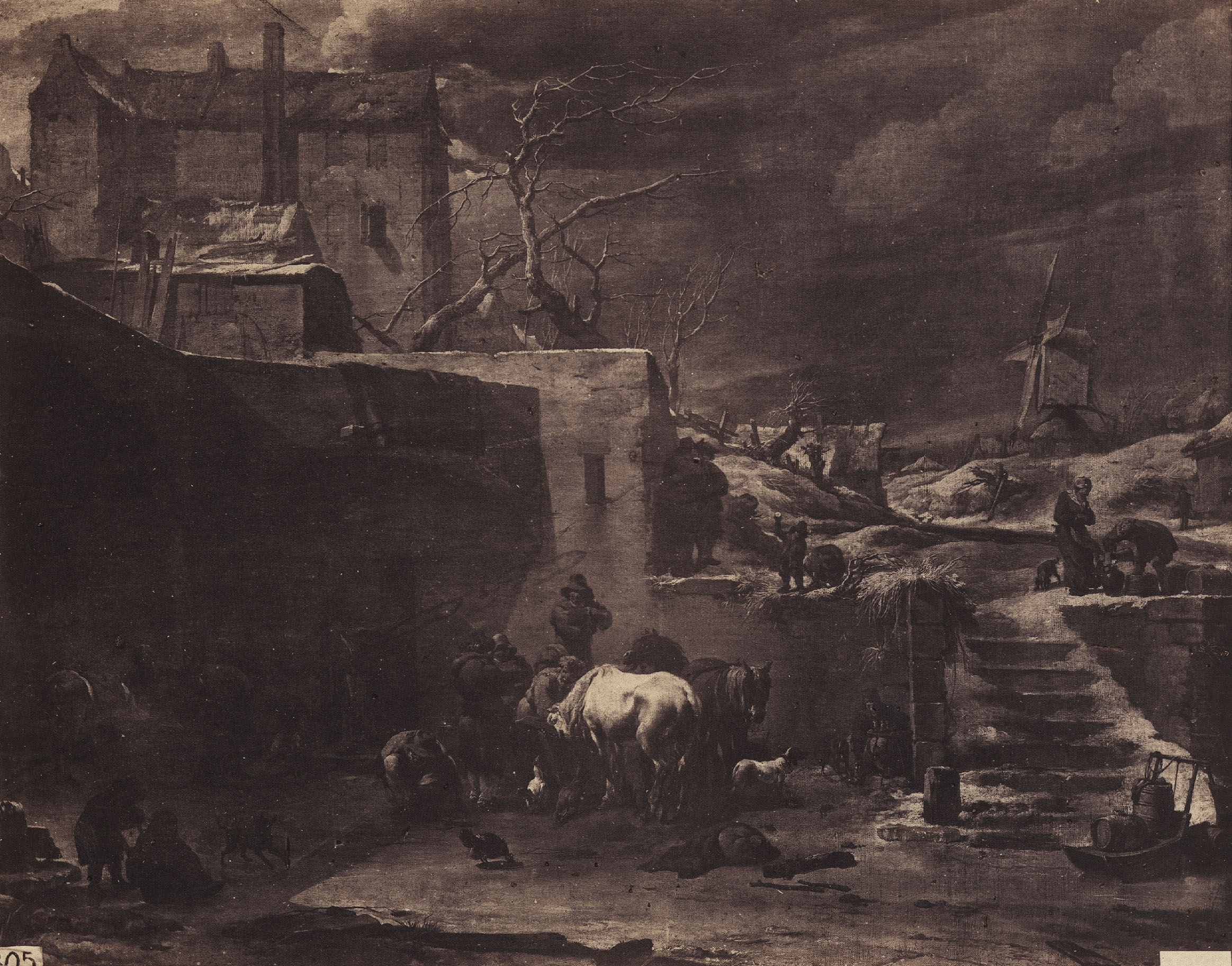
"Winter Landscape", 1652 (photo by Caldesi & Montecchi, 1857)
