= Dirck van Bergen =

Painter from the Northern Netherlands (1645–1700)

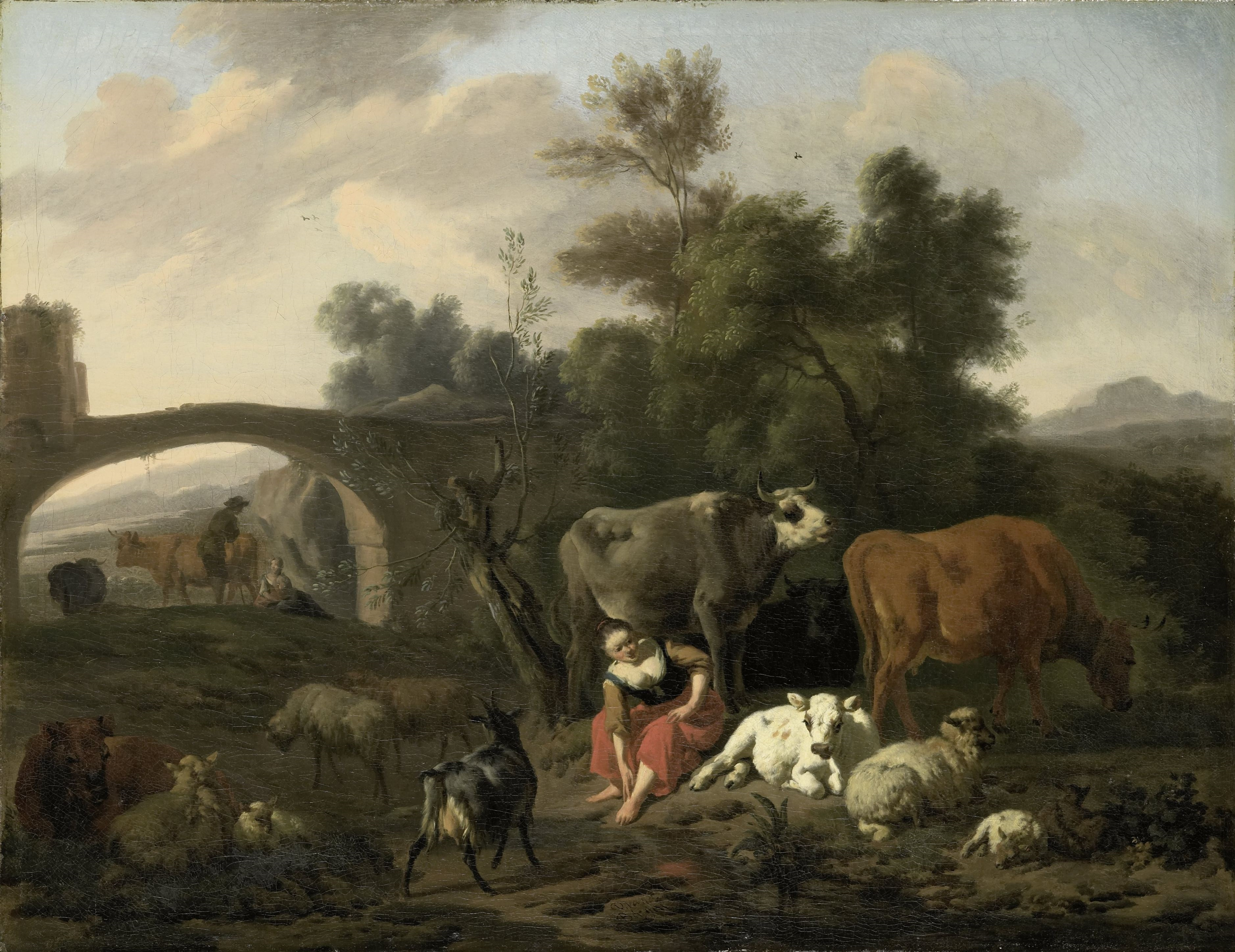
Shepherds with cattle

Dirck van Bergen (1645, Haarlem – c. 1700, Haarlem) was a Dutch Golden Age landscape painter.

== Biography ==
According to Houbraken he was a pupil of Adriaen van de Velde, who copied his style very well. He was a popular man who spent his money as easily as he earned it, and spent some time in England, but died in Haarlem.

According to the RKD his work later influenced Wilhelm von Kobell.
