= List of works in the collection of Jan Gildemeester =

The following is an incomplete list of works in the collection of Jan Gildemeester that are listed by catalog number in the sales catalog prepared by Philippus van der Schley at his estate sale in 1800. The collection of Jan Gildemeester consisted of 300 paintings mentioned in this catalog, but also included several family portraits and the commissioned painting of the gallery itself by Adriaen de Lelie. These were kept back by the family and were later dispersed in various collections.

image	Article	creator	date	collection	inventory number	catalog #
	The Threatened Swan	Jan Asselijn	1650	Rijksmuseum	SK-A-4	2
	Princess Mary anchored off Durgerdam	Ludolf Bakhuizen	1688	private collection		7
	Italian port with peasants and a couple with a parasol	Nicolaes Pieterszoon Berchem	1660s	private collection		11
	Resting Cattle near a Grave monument	Dirck van der Bergen	1680s	Rijksdienst voor het Cultureel Erfgoed	NK2645	13
	View of the Haarlem Bavo Church from the Groenmarkt	Gerrit Adriaenszoon Berckheyde	1666	private collection		15
	Portrait of Jan van Huysum	Arnold Boonen	1720	Rijksmuseum	SK-A-5008	22
	The Letter	Gerard ter Borch	1660s	Royal Collection	RCIN 405532	28
	An Evening Landscape with Figures and Sheep	Aelbert Cuyp	1650s	Royal Collection	RCIN 405827	30
	A Young Lady Playing a Clavichord	Gerrit Dou	1660s	private collection		34
	Girl chopping Onions	Gerrit Dou	1646	Royal Collection	RCIN 406358	35
	A Maidservant Scouring a Brass Pan at a Window	Gerrit Dou	1663	Royal Collection	RCIN 404618	36
	View of the Binnenhof in The Hague	Paulus Constantijn la Fargue	1770	private collection		53
	View of the Groenmarkt looking towards Westeinde in The Hague	Paulus Constantijn la Fargue	1770	private collection		54
	Portrait of a Husband and Wife	Frans van Mieris the Younger	1675	Philadelphia Museum of Art	Inv. 310	56
	Interior of a House on the Dunne Bierkade, The Hague	Maria Margaretha la Fargue	1780	Gemeentemuseum Den Haag		56
	Laughing Cavalier	Frans Hals	1624	The Wallace Collection	P84	64
	The Outskirts of a Wood	Meindert Hobbema	1660s	The Wallace Collection	P164	75
	Interior of a Kitchen with a Woman, a Child and a Maid	Pieter de Hooch	1670	private collection		78
	'A Woman Preparing Bread and Butter for a Boy	Pieter de Hooch	1661	J. Paul Getty Museum	84.PA.47	79
	Still life of flowers in a terracotta vase, before a niche	Jan van Huysum	1734	private collection		87
	Still life of fruit heaped in a basket, next to an urn	Jan van Huysum	1730s	private collection		88
	Still life of flowers and fruit on a marble slab	Jan van Huysum	1731	private collection		89
	Flowers in a Terracotta Vase	Jan van Huysum	1736	National Gallery	NG796	90
	Bouquet of Flowers in an Urn	Jan van Huysum	1724	Los Angeles County Museum of Art	M.91.164.2	91
	A Smith shoeing an Ox	Karel Dujardin	1650s	Dulwich Picture Gallery	DPG082	103
	Morning Visit	Adriaan de Lelie	1796	Rijksmuseum	SK-A-1075	122
	The Pancake Baker with a Boy	Gabriël Metsu	1656	private collection		133
	The Astronomer	Johannes Vermeer	1668	Louvre	RF 1983-28	139
	Portrait of a Husband and Wife	Frans van Mieris the Elder	1675	Philadelphia Museum of Art	Inv. 310	140
	Young woman at her toilet	Frans van Mieris the Elder	1663	Bridgewater Collection		141
	A Meal of Oysters	Frans van Mieris the Elder	1661	Mauritshuis	819	142
	Sleeping Hurdy-Gurdy Player	Willem van Mieris	1700s	private collection		143
	Still life with fruit and a finch drawing water	Abraham Mignon	1660s	Rijksmuseum	SK-A-266	151
	Peasants Dancing in a Tavern	Adriaen van Ostade	1659	Saint Louis Art Museum	147:1966	160
	7 Peasants in a Tavern	Adriaen van Ostade	1665	Royal Collection	RCIN 404619	163
	Interior of a Peasant's Cottage with a Child about to be Fed	Adriaen van Ostade	1651	Royal Collection	RCIN 406724	166
	Travellers Outside an Inn	Isaac van Ostade	1647	Royal Collection	RCIN 405216	169
	The Young Thief	Paulus Potter	1649	Royal Collection	RCIN 400527	173
	Portrait of Jan Rijcksen and his Wife Griet Jans	Rembrandt	1633	Royal Collection	RCIN 405533	180
	Tobias healing his blind father	Rembrandt	1636	Staatsgalerie Stuttgart	2521	181
	Portrait of a man in an armchair (Bridgewater)	Rembrandt	1637	Bridgewater Collection		182
	Mercury escorting Psyche to Mount Olympus and her marriage with Amor	Peter Paul Rubens	1650-1699	private collection		187
	Young Man with a Falcon	Peter Paul Rubens	1630s	Royal Collection	RCIN 407527	188
	Landscape with a Windmill near a Town Moat	Jacob van Ruisdael	1650s	private collection		189
	A Landscape with a Ruined Castle and a Church	Jacob van Ruisdael	1665	National Gallery	NG990	190
	The Fat Kitchen	Jan Steen	1650s	Cheltenham Art Gallery & Museum	1899:1.9	204
	The Lean Kitchen	Jan Steen	1650s	Cheltenham Art Gallery & Museum	1899:1.10	205
	Peasants Dancing outside a Country House	David Teniers the Younger	1645	Royal Collection	RCIN 405326	214
	The Backgammon Players	Jacob Ochtervelt	1660s	Foundation E.G. Bührle		231
	The surrender of the Royal Prince during the Four Days' Battle, 1–4 June 1666	Willem van de Velde the Younger	1670	private collection		235
	A Calm with a States Yacht, A Barge and many other Vessels under Sail	Willem van de Velde the Younger	1659	Royal Collection	RCIN 407275	237
	Landscape: Woman Milking a Cow	Adriaen van de Velde	1669	Cannon Hall	A.1952	241
	A Woodland Glade with Animals and Figures	Adriaen van de Velde	1664	Royal Collection	RCIN 404082	243
	The Death of Epaminondas	Isaac Walraven	1726	Rijksmuseum	SK-A-461	251
	Cimon and Pero	Adriaen van der Werff	1708	Royal Collection	RCIN 406626	258
	A Riding-School in the Open	Philips Wouwerman	1660s	Deutsche Barockgalerie	12579	266
	A Riding-School in the Open, with a Coach	Philips Wouwerman	1667	Waddesdon Manor	2569	267
	The Halt of a Hawking Party at a Wayside Inn	Philips Wouwerman	1650s	Royal Collection	RCIN 406736	270
	News Deliverer	Gerrit Zegelaar	1769	Museum for Communication	44759 b	284
	Postman	Gerrit Zegelaar	1769	Museum for Communication	44759 b	285
	Hay Farmer	Gerrit Zegelaar	1670s	private collection		288
	Hay Farmwife	Gerrit Zegelaar	1670s	private collection		289

== See also ==
- The Art Gallery of Jan Gildemeester Jansz

== Sources ==
- Catalogus van het kabinet van schilderyen, nagelaaten door den kunstminnaar Jan Gildemeester Jansz. Amsterdam, by Philippus van der Schley, 1800
