= A Young Lady Playing a Clavichord =

Painting by Gerard Dou

Young Lady Playing a Clavichord
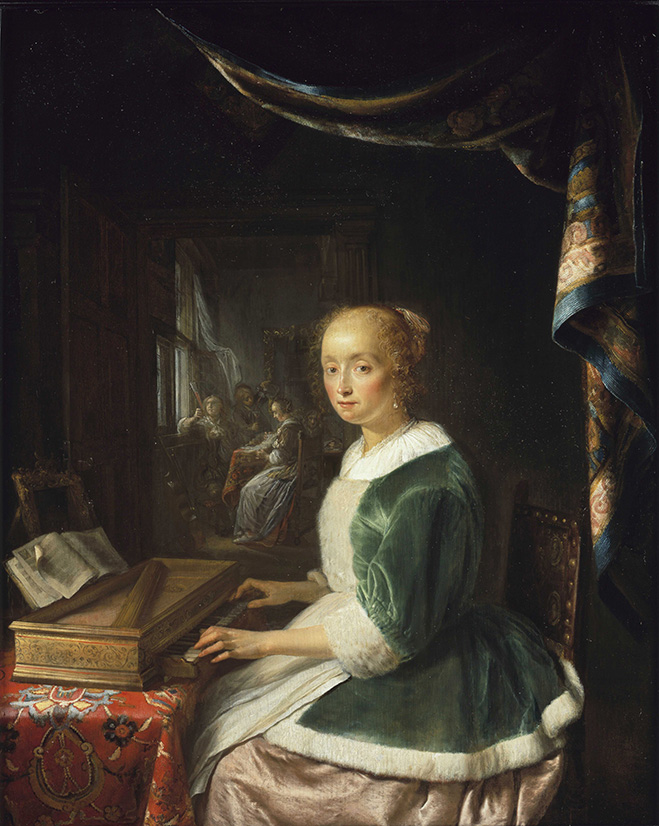
- Artist: Gerrit Dou
- Year: 1660s
- Medium: oil paint, panel
- Dimensions: 39 cm (15 in) × 32 cm (13 in)

Young Lady Playing a Clavichord is a 1660s genre painting by Gerrit Dou. It is an example of Dutch Golden Age painting and is today in a private collection.

== Early history and creation ==
This painting by Dou was documented by Hofstede de Groot in 1908, who wrote:

133. A YOUNG LADY PLAYING ON THE VIRGINALS. Sm. 45 and Suppl. 14; M. 301a, and see M. 301 and M. 302. A young lady, seen at three-quarter length in profile to the left, sits playing on the virginals, placed on a table covered with a Persian carpet. She turns her head to the spectator. She wears a green velvet jacket trimmed with white fur and an apron. A curtain is drawn back above her to the right.

In the left background, through an open door, is seen an adjoining room in which two gentlemen and a lady sit at table by an open window; a man-servant gives one of the gentlemen a glass of wine. Panel, 15 inches by 12 inches. Described by Descamps in the Issenheim collection, 1754. Exhibited at the British Gallery, 1821. Saks. (Possibly not all referring to the same picture.) Marechal d'Issenheim, Paris, 1754. Comte du Barry, Paris, November 21, 1774 (5000 francs). Prince de Conti, Paris, April 8, 1777 (5000 francs, Langlier); a note by Glomy in a copy of Blanc's Trésor, p. 380, says that this came from a sale at Langford's, London, and was there regarded as a copy by Schalcken. Paul Benfield, London, June 21 or July 2, 1799 (£210, or £231, according to Sm.).

J. Gildemeester Jansz, Amsterdam, June 11, 1800, No. 34 (975 florins, Labouchere). William Wells of Redleaf, London, May 12, 1848. In the collection of the Earl of Northbrook, London. In the possession of the London dealers Thomas Agnew and Sons. Now in the Gould collection, New York.

== Description and interpretation ==
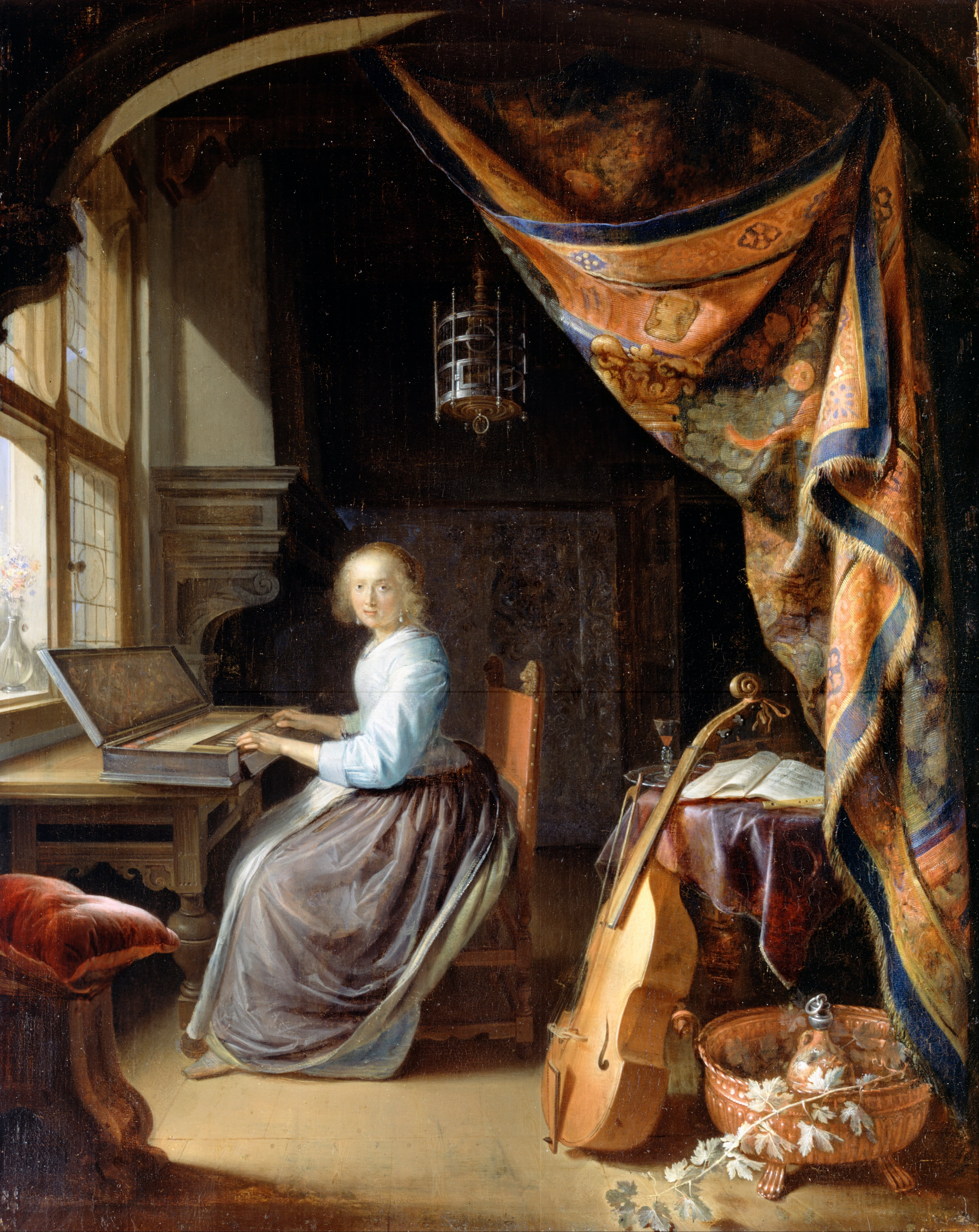
A Woman playing a Clavichord, Dulwich Gallery, Hofstede de Groot #132

The work shows a lady playing a clavichord in an interior with other ladies in the background, as if she is playing the background entertainment for a small party. Like Martin before him, Hofstede de Groot listed this painting immediately after the painting in the Dulwich Picture Gallery, which shows a similar clavichord player alone in smaller room.

== Later history and influence ==
Apparently in 1665 the collector Johan de Bye and flower painter Johannes Hannot showed 32 Dou paintings together in Leiden. This painting was in the Hannot collection and the Dulwich painting belonged to De Bye.

In 2012 A Young Lady Playing a Clavichord was sold at Christie's for 3.3 million dollars.

The painting can be seen hanging bottom left in The Art Gallery of Jan Gildemeester Jansz which was painted in the 1790s. In 2016 both paintings were on show at the Dulwich Gallery, effectively reuniting these works that had once before been shown together.
