= The Art Gallery of Jan Gildemeester Jansz =

Painting by Adriaan de Lelie

- De kunstgalerij van Jan Gildemeester Jansz (Dutch)
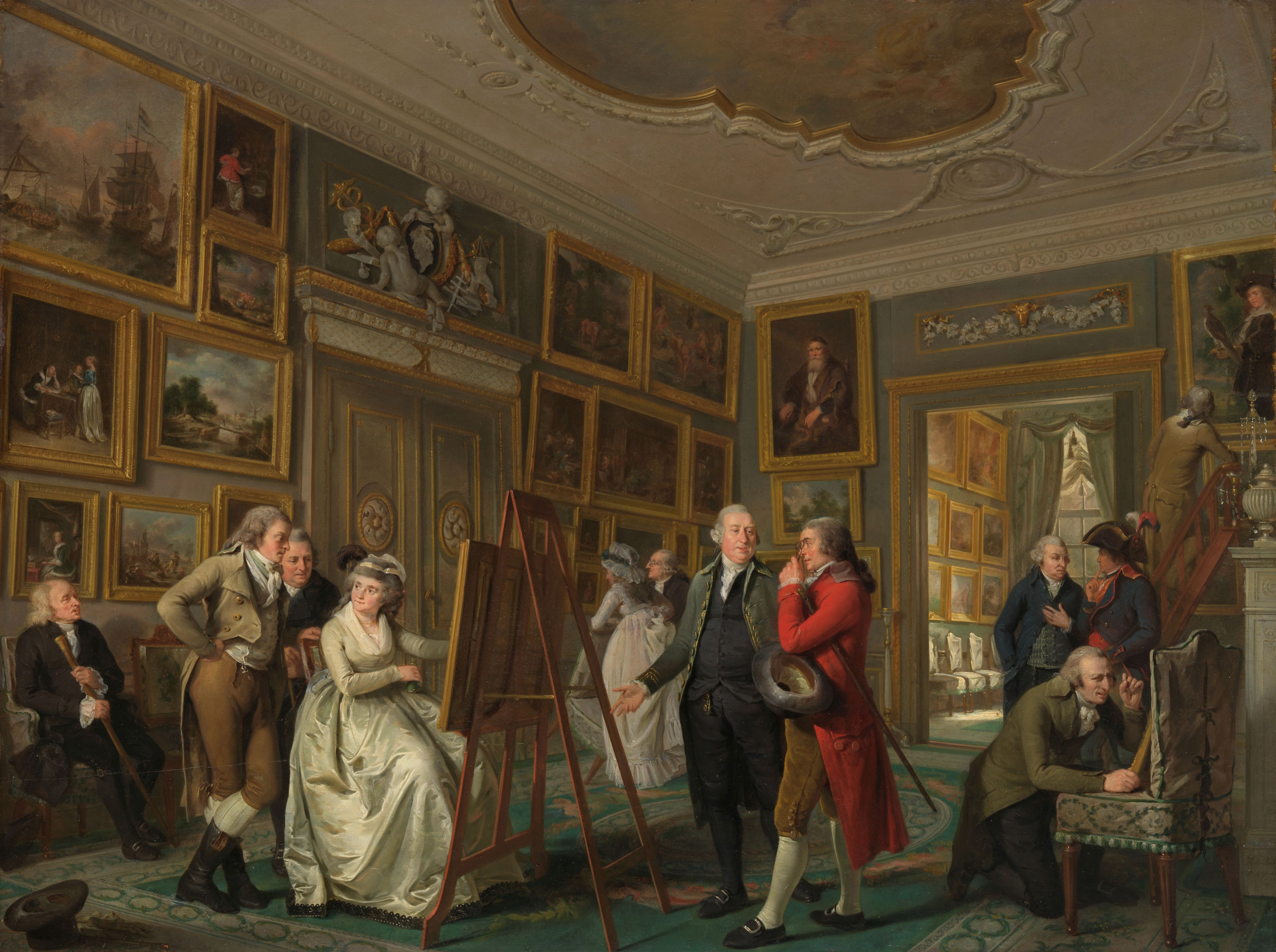
- Artist: Adriaan de Lelie
- Year: 1794–95
- Medium: oil paint on panel
- Dimensions: 63.7 cm × 85.7 cm (25.1 in × 33.7 in)
- Location: Rijksmuseum; Amsterdam
- Accession: SK-A-4100
- Website: Rijksmuseum

The Art Gallery of Jan Gildemeester Jansz is a painting created by the Dutch painter Adriaan de Lelie in 1794–95. It is part of the collection of the Rijksmuseum Amsterdam, executed in oil paint on panel. It depicts the art collector Jan Gildemeester Jansz (or Jan Jansz. Gildemeester) in the midst of his large collection of paintings, showing them to friends.

The painting was acquired by the Rijksmuseum in 1964 after being part of a French private collection.

== Art historical context and inspiration ==
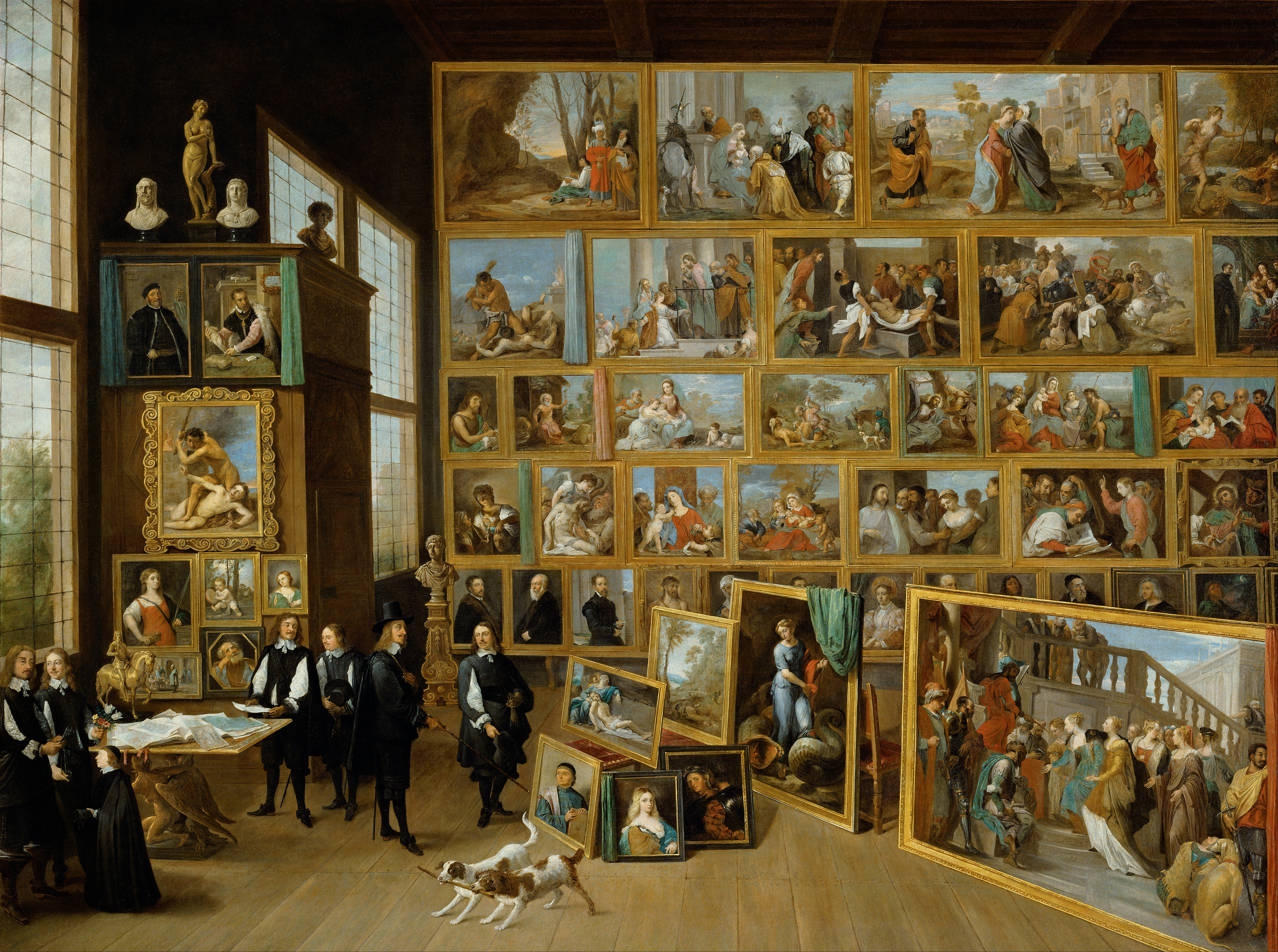
Example of a Flemish 17th-century 'konstkamer'. David Teniers the Younger: Archduke Leopold William in his Gallery at Brussels, ca. 1650, Kunsthistorisches Museum, Wien.

=== Kunstkamers ===
According to the art historian C.J. De Bruyn Knops, the subject of the work – an art collector at home, showing his art collection to his friends – is unique in Northern-Netherlandish painting before 1800. In Flemish (Southern-Netherlandish) painting, this genre was common in the 17th century; it was executed by masters like Willem van Haecht, David Teniers, Gillis van Tilborgh and Gonzales Cocques, but in the Northern Netherlands the subject didn't become popular. Probably Adriaan de Lelie had seen such works while studying in Antwerp. However, the Flemish 'kunstkamers' ('art rooms') looked very different: they used to depict imaginary architecture, and probably not reality as seen by the painter. The Art Gallery of Jan Gildemeester Jansz, on the contrary, is a very accurate depiction of a real space.

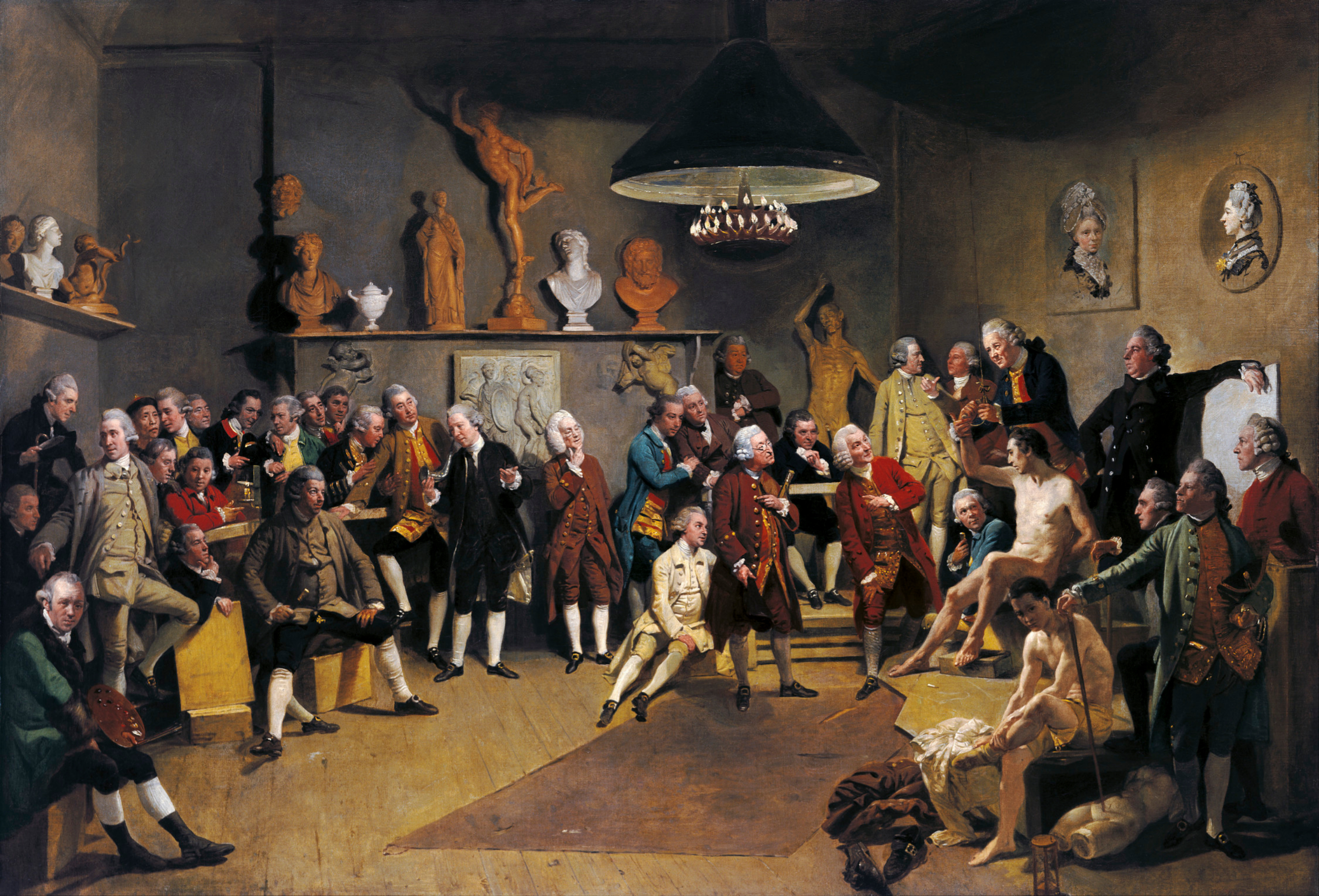
Johan Zoffany: The Academicians of the Royal Academy, 1772, Royal Collection of the United Kingdom. Jan Jansz. Gildemeester owned an engraving after this painting, which might have inspired the spontaneous figures in the work by Adriaan de Lelie.

=== Household scenes ===
Adriaan de Lelie follows the tradition of intimate household scenes that were painted very commonly in the Northern Netherlands since the 17th century. Usually, the people in such genre works are clearly striking a pose, while the visitors in The Art Gallery of Jan Gildemeester Jansz look very natural, as if they are unaware of the presence of the painter. Probably, De Lelie was inspired by English contemporaries here: Jan Jansz. Gildemeester possessed a 1773 engraving of a spontaneous group painting by Johan Zoffany, which must have been familiar to De Lelie.

== Depicted space, people and artworks ==
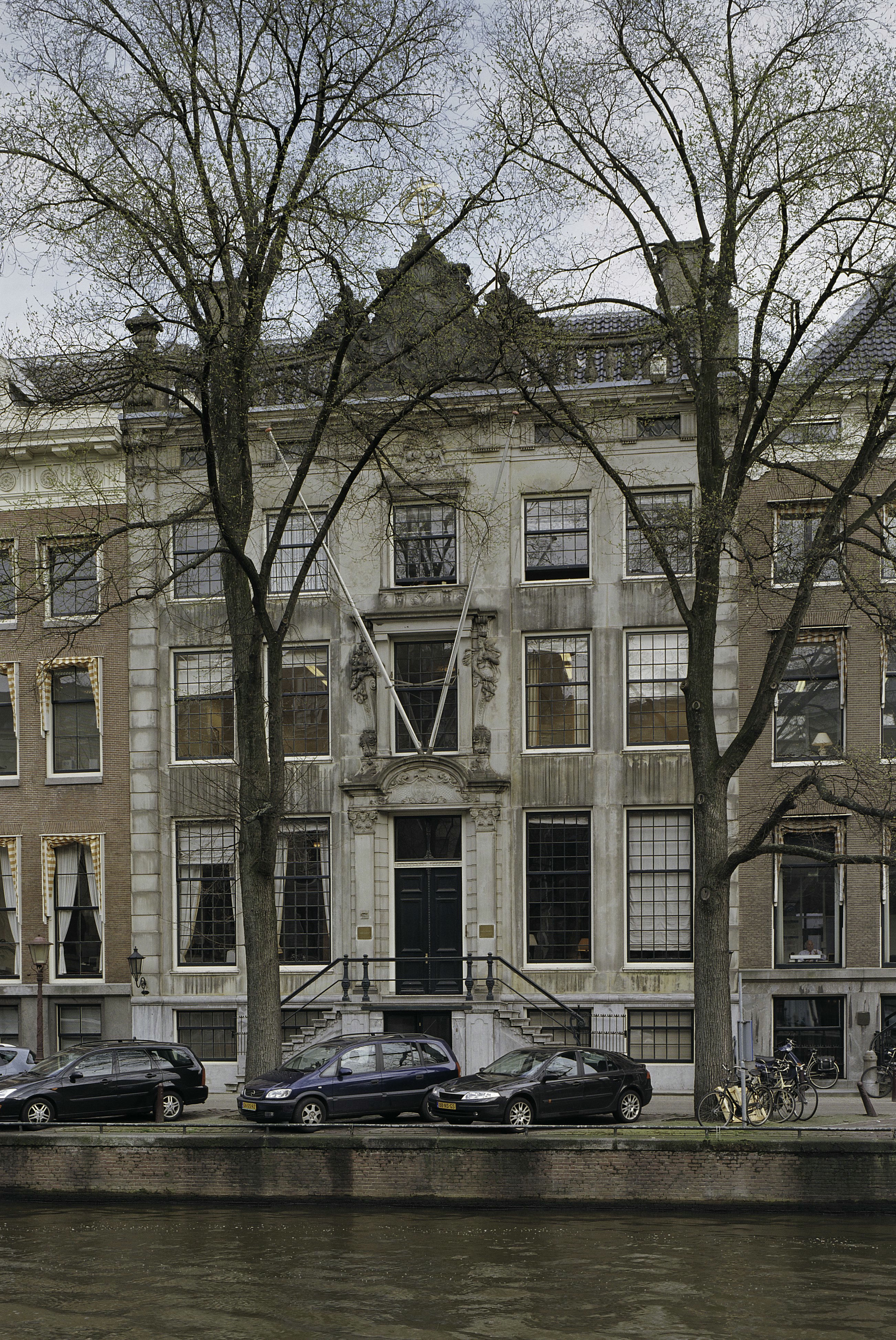
Herengracht 475 in 2005.

The two rooms depicted in this painting still exist: the large room in front and the smaller one with windows in the back are part of the house that was owned by Jan Jansz. Gildemeester since 1792, currently a Rijksmonument located on Herengracht 475 in Amsterdam. The ceiling painting in the first room (by Jacob de Wit, 1731) the relief above the door and other decorations have been restored during a 20th-century renovation.

Jan Jansz. Gildemeester stands in the middle of the work. Adriaan de Lelie has probably portrayed himself kneeling on the right. Other people depicted in the work are possibly the Amsterdam-based art trader Pierre Fouquet Jr., Dutch physicist baron Cornelius Rudolphus Theodorus Krayenhoff (wearing a tricorne hat), painter Jurriaan Andriessen, tradesman Anthony Dull and his wife Marianne Dull-Dohrmann (sitting behind the easel on the left), and art collector and writer Bernardus de Bosch Jeronimosz. – according to C.J. De Bruyn Knops, the RKD and the Rijksmuseum's website, but this opinion is questioned by others.

As usual in that era, the paintings are arranged in rows, close to each other on the walls. It is highly likely that the visible artworks were chosen by the collector and painter together, specifically for this painting, and that they were considered the highlights from Gildemeesters collection. Many works in the first room can be identified with certainty. The art collection of Jan Jansz. Gildemeester was auctioned after his death in 1800, and the auction catalogue documents the works in quite a bit of detail. Gildemeester's taste as an art collector corresponds with that of his contemporaries: he mainly owned genre pieces, marine paintings, landscapes, animal and still-life paintings. His earliest purchases probably were drawings and prints, of which he also built a considerable collection.

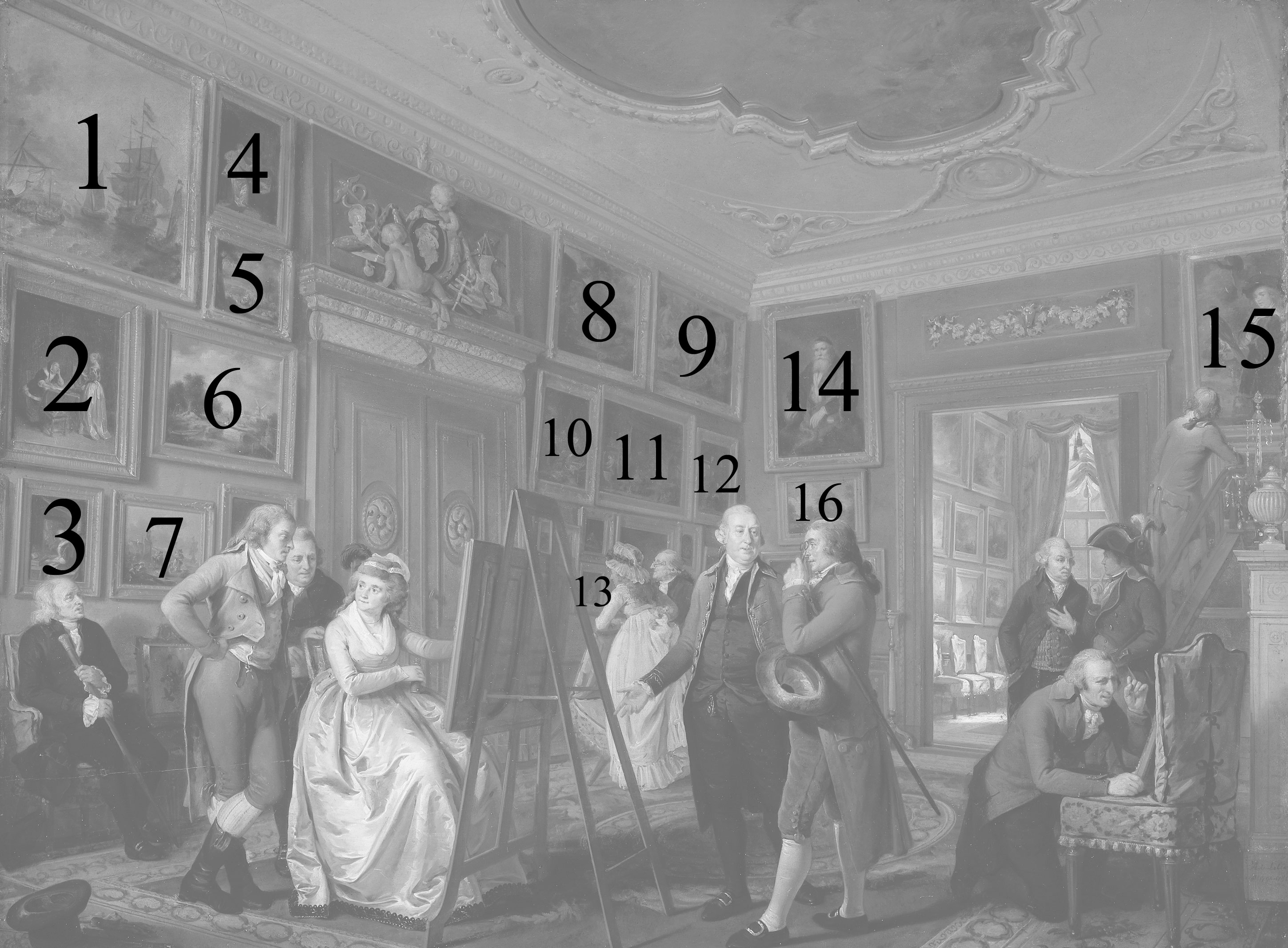

	Artwork	Current collection (if known)
1	Ludolf Bakhuizen: The Princess Mary Moored off Durgerdam, 1688	Private collection
2	Gerard ter Borch: The Letter, c. 1660–1665	Royal Collection
3	Gerrit Dou: A Young Lady Playing a Clavichord, 17th century	Private collection
4	Jacob Ochtervelt: The Backgammon Players, c. 1667–69	Foundation E.G. Bührle
5	Adriaen van de Velde: Landscape: Woman Milking a Cow, c. 1669	Cannon Hall Museum
6	Jacob van Ruisdael: Landscape with a Windmill Near a Town Moat, 1650s	Private collection
7	Nicolaes Berchem: Italian Port with Peasants and a Couple with a Parasol, 1660s	Private collection Earl of Haddington, Mellerstain, Scotland. Stolen in 1981 and possibly burned.
8	Dirk van Bergen: Resting Cattle by a Grave Monument, 1670–1689	Rijksdienst voor het Cultureel Erfgoed
9	Peter Paul Rubens: Mercury escorting Psyche to Mount Olympus	Collection Duke of Sutherland (according to the 1965 article by De Bruyn Kops; current collection unknown)
10	Gabriel Metsu: The Pancake Baker, 1655–58	Gemäldegalerie Berlin, long-term loan from private collection
11	David Teniers the Younger: Boerendeel	Private collection
12	Pieter de Hooch: A Woman Preparing Bread and Butter for a Boy, c. 1660–1663	J. Paul Getty Museum
13	Frans van Mieris I: A Woman at her Mirror, 1662–64	Private collection, Duke of Sutherland
14	Rembrandt: Portrait of an Old Man in an Armchair, 1637	Private collection, Duke of Sutherland
15	Formerly attributed to Peter Paul Rubens, now attributed to Jan van Boeckhorst: Young Man with a Falcon, c. 1630	Royal Collection
16	Meindert Hobbema: The Outskirts of a Wood, 1660s	Wallace Collection

== See also ==
- List of works in the collection of Jan Gildemeester
