= Jean-Baptiste Pillement =

French painter

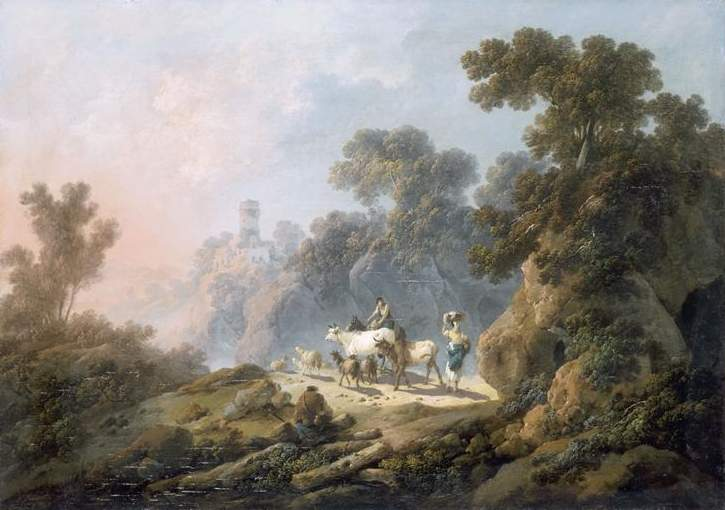
Jean-Baptiste Pillement - Landscape with cattle (Louvre)

Jean-Baptiste Pillement (24 May 1728 – 26 April 1808) was a French painter and designer, known for his exquisite and delicate landscapes, but whose importance lies primarily in the engravings done after his drawings, and their influence in spreading the Rococo style and particularly the taste for chinoiserie throughout Europe.

== Life ==
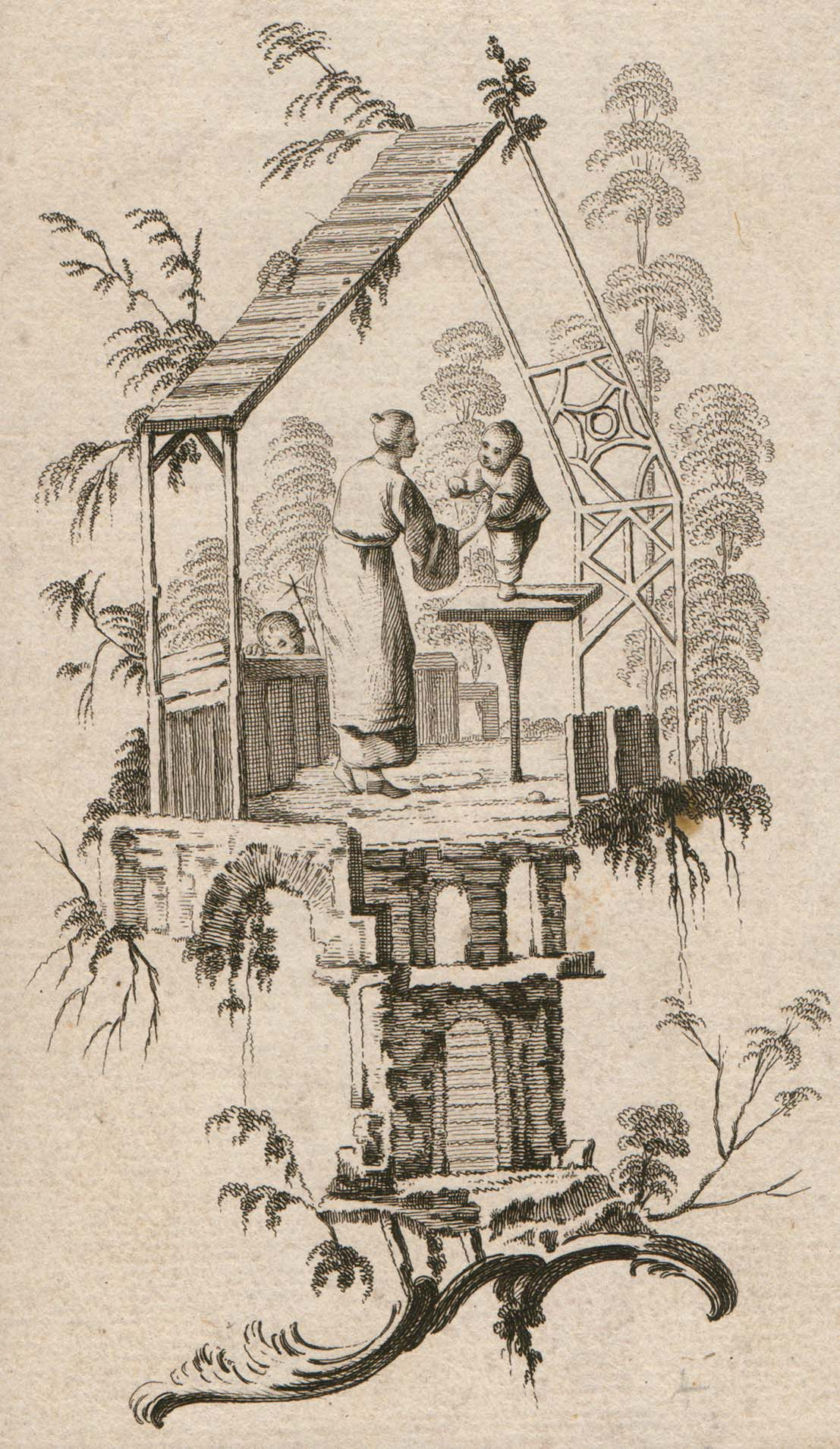
Unknown engraver after J. Pillement. Vignette au gout chinois. 1760s. Private collection, Russia

Pillement was born and died in Lyon, but had an unusually cosmopolitan career. In 1743, at the age of 15, he moved from Lyon to Paris where he was employed by Jean-Baptiste Oudry as an apprentice designer at the "Manufacture de Beauvais". In 1745 he left for Madrid, where he remained for five years. There he found employment in various cities as both a designer and painter. A landscape dated 1748 reveals rustic themes he was to repeat often: sun-bathed shepherds leading their goats and sheep to a cascading stream, a water mill, rocky elevations covered in lush vegetation, and the poeticized relics of an ancient bridge. In 1750, at the age of 22, he moved to Lisbon, where he enjoyed continuing success. The lure of travel compelled him to decline an offer to become court painter to King Joseph of Portugal, and he worked at Queluz (Sintra) for Jan Gildemeester. In 1754 he left Lisbon for London, only one year before the Lisbon Earthquake.

Pillement then spent eight years in England, fully exploiting the English taste for (Dutch) landscapes. There he was inspired by the paintings of, among others, Nicolaes Berchem. During this period he became acquainted with David Garrick, the famous actor, and his Austrian wife Eva Maria Weigel, who became avid collectors of his work. In 1763 Pillement then traveled to Vienna, where he was employed at the Imperial Court of Maria Theresa and Francis I and worked at one of the Laxenburg castles. In 1765 he left Vienna for Warsaw, where his many projects included decorating the Royal Castle in Warsaw and the Ujazdowski Castle, his largest project, commissioned by King Stanisław II Augustus, an admirer of his work. He then settled in Saint Petersburg, the Piedmont, Milan, Rome, and Venice. In 1768-1780 Pillement moved to Versailles, where he produced decorations for Marie Antoinette in the Petit Trianon. In 1780-1789 he was in Switzerland (Basel), once again on the Iberian Peninsula (Cadiz), and in 1789 moved to Pézenas in the Languedoc. In 1800 he returned to Lyon, where he continued to paint while also designing for the silk industry and giving lessons in the Academy founded by Napoleon. He remained in his native Lyon until his death in 1808.

== Works ==
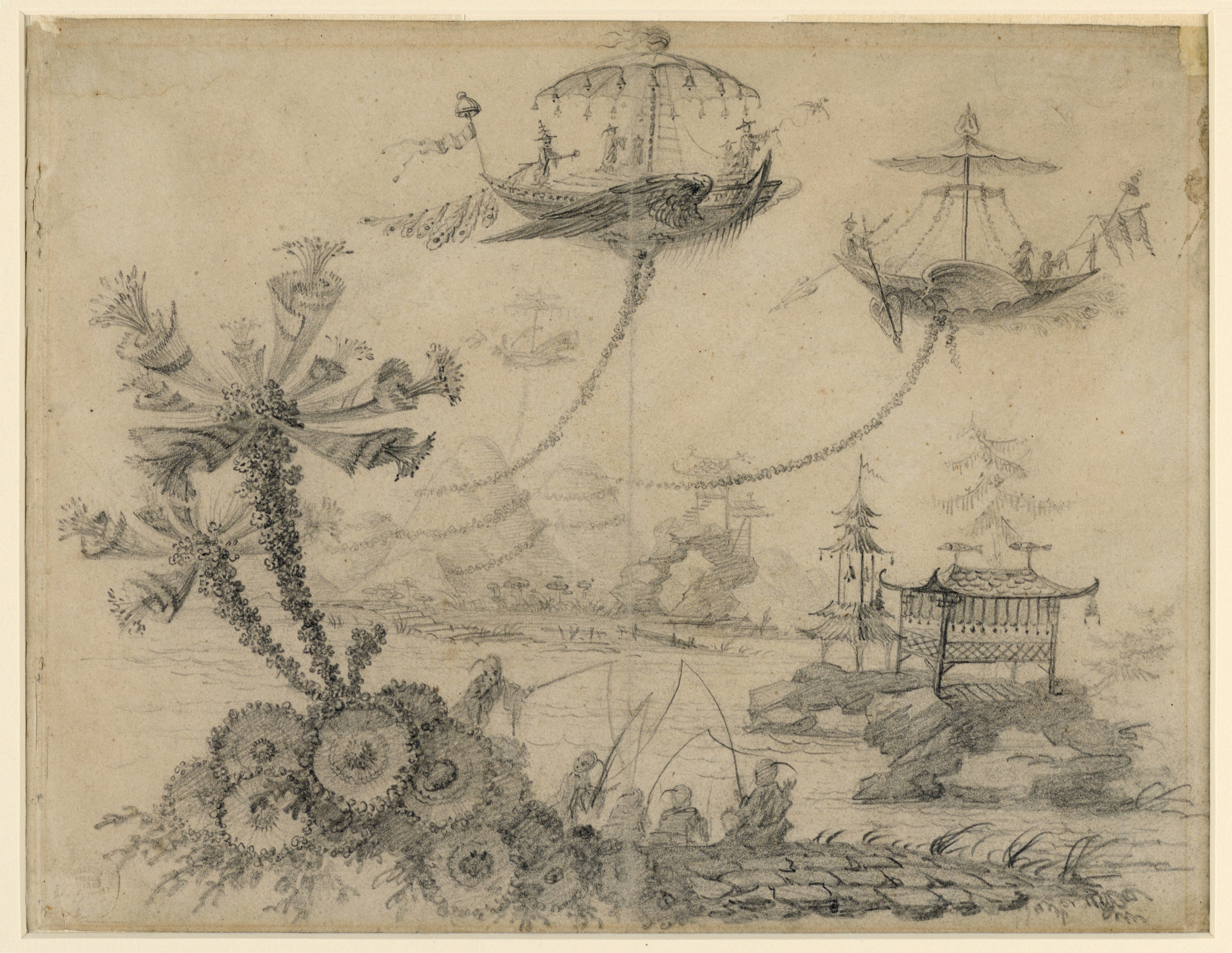
Drawing "Chinoiserie Fantasy"

Pillement's illustrations are a mixture of fantastic birds, flora & fauna, large human figures and chinoiserie. He often worked with printmakers such as Anne Allen, who would become his wife. His designs were used by several engravers and decorators on porcelain and pottery, but also on textiles, wallpaper and silver. Pillement had discovered in 1764 a new method of printing on silk with fast colours (recorded in his Memoirs). One of his prime vehicles was the single print marketed independently of an album. He published many albums, one is: Œùvre de fleurs, ornements, cartouches, figures et sujets chinois (1776).

== Collections ==
- Art Institute of Chicago
- Art Gallery of Greater Victoria (British Columbia)
- British Museum
- Cleveland Museum of Art
- Courtauld Institute of Art (London)
- Getty Museum
- Honolulu Museum of Art
- Indiana University Art Museum (Bloomington, Indiana)
- Metropolitan Museum of Art (New York City)
- Museum der bildenden Künste (Leipzig, Germany)
- Museum of Fine Arts, Boston
- National Gallery of Art (Washington D.C.)
- Palazzo Pitti (Florence)
- Gulbenkian Museum (Lisbon, Portugal)
- Philadelphia Museum of Art
- Château du Grand Lucé, France
- National Gallery of Ireland
- Museu de Artes Decorativas Portuguesas (Lisboa, Portugal)

== Sources ==
- Gruber, A. (1992) The History of Decorative Arts, Classicism and the Baroque in Europe, p. 249.
- Gordon-Smith, Maria. (2006) PILLEMENT. (Monograph, edited by Michael Lederer and Joanna Wolanska.)
