= Landscape with a Windmill near a Town Moat =

Painting by Jacob van Ruisdael

Landscape with a Windmill Near a Town Moat
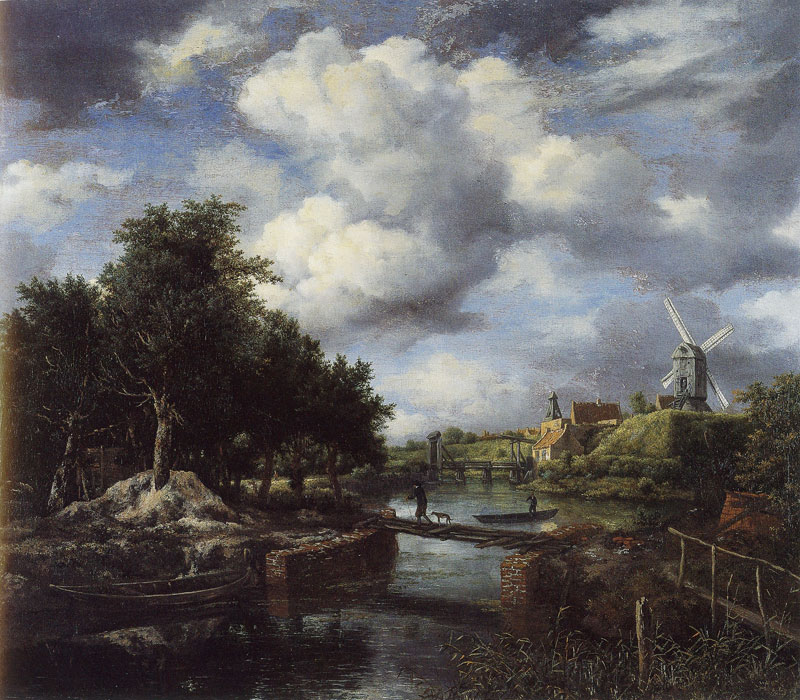
- Artist: Jacob van Ruisdael
- Year: 1650s
- Dimensions: 63 cm × 76.5 cm (25 in × 30.1 in)
- Location: Private collection

Landscape with a Windmill Near a Town Moat (c. 1650s) is an oil on canvas painting by the Dutch landscape painter Jacob van Ruisdael. It is an example of Dutch Golden Age painting and is now in a private collection.

This painting was documented by Hofstede de Groot in 1911, who wrote; "174. LANDSCAPE WITH A WIND-MILL. Sm. 135. A town-moat stretches from the distance to the foreground, which it almost fills. In the immediate right foreground is the reedy bank with a wooden bridge. Farther back are brick walls, the remains of a sluice, which are connected by planks. A man with a dog crosses to the left bank which is thickly planted with trees. Near the bank is a boat on the water. In the middle distance is a man in a flat-bottomed boat on the sunlit water. Farther back is a wooden drawbridge over the moat to the town, above whose wall rise house-roofs and a great wooden mill. A fine summer day with clouds in the sky. More or less in the style of Hobbema. The figures are by Ruisdael himself. An attractive picture. Canvas, 25 inches by 30 1/2 inches. Engraved by J. H. Wright in the Stafford Gallery. In the collection of Lord Francis Egerton, London, 1835 (Sm.). In the collection of the Earl of Ellesmere, Bridgewater House, London, 1892 catalogue, No. 197."

This painting was documented in earlier estate sale catalogs of Pieter Locquet and Jan Gildemeester and Hofstede de Groot therefore listed it also as #16, though at the time he didn't know it was the same painting as his #174.

== See also ==
- List of paintings by Jacob van Ruisdael
