= A Landscape with a Ruined Castle and a Church =

Painting by Jacob van Ruisdael

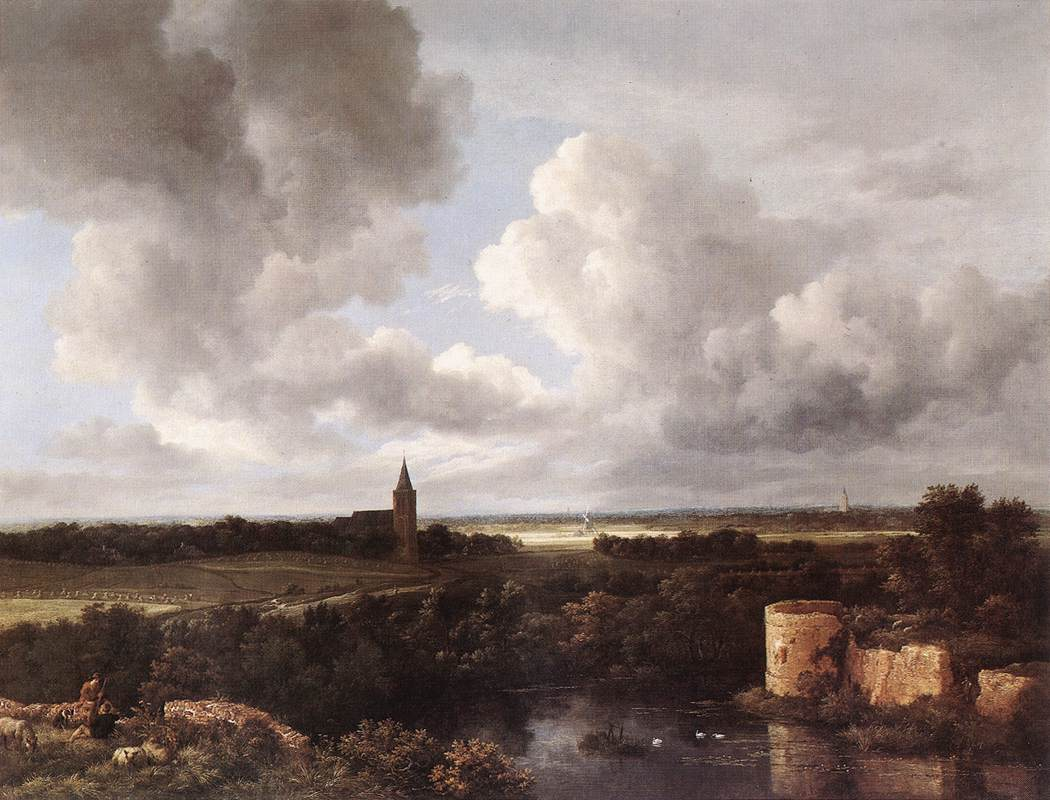
- Artist: Jacob van Ruisdael
- Year: c. 1665
- Dimensions: 109 cm × 146 cm (43 in × 57 in)
- Location: National Gallery, London

A Landscape with a Ruined Castle and a Church (c. 1665) is an oil on canvas painting by the Dutch landscape painter Jacob van Ruisdael. It is an example of Dutch Golden Age painting and is now in the collection of the National Gallery.

== Description ==
This painting was documented by Hofstede de Groot in 1911, who wrote; "136. Landscape with Cornfields, and Sheep and Figures. Sm. 214. A far-reaching view across an open plain varied with woods, meadows, and cornfields, villages and churches amid trees, cottages and windmills. In front are the ruins of a castle with a stagnant moat, fringed with trees and underwood. On the left a winding road passes a cornfield with sheaves and a group of trees and is lost in the distance. A shepherd sits on the old castle-wall, conversing with a youth seated on the ground, near a dog and three sheep. On a bastion, on the other side, are three sheep; in a breach of the bastion stands a man. On a pool are three swans. The figures and cattle are by A. van de Velde. A thunderstorm has just passed over. In the sky are masses of rolling cloud, through which sunbeams fall on windmills in the distance. The rest of the landscape is in partial shadow. "This capital picture may be cited as a chef d'oeuvre of the artist in this peculiar department of landscape-painting " (Sm.). [Compare 775, 776.] Canvas, 43 inches by 57 inches. Exhibited at Manchester, 1857, No. 699, by R. Sanderson. Sale. Jan Gildemeester, Amsterdam, June 11, 1800, No. 190 (315 florins, Tays). In the collection of the Marquis de Marialva, Paris, 1825; bought privately by Sm. Sales. John Smith, London, 1828 (£472 : 10s.). Abrahams, London, 1831 (£275). In the collection of Richard Sanderson, London, 1835 (Sm.). Sale. R. Sanderson, London, June 17, 1848 (£504, Brown); but apparently bought in, for it was in the Sanderson collection in 1854 (Waagen, ii. 288), and was lent from it to Manchester in 1857. "

This scene is very similar to other paintings Ruisdael made in this period.

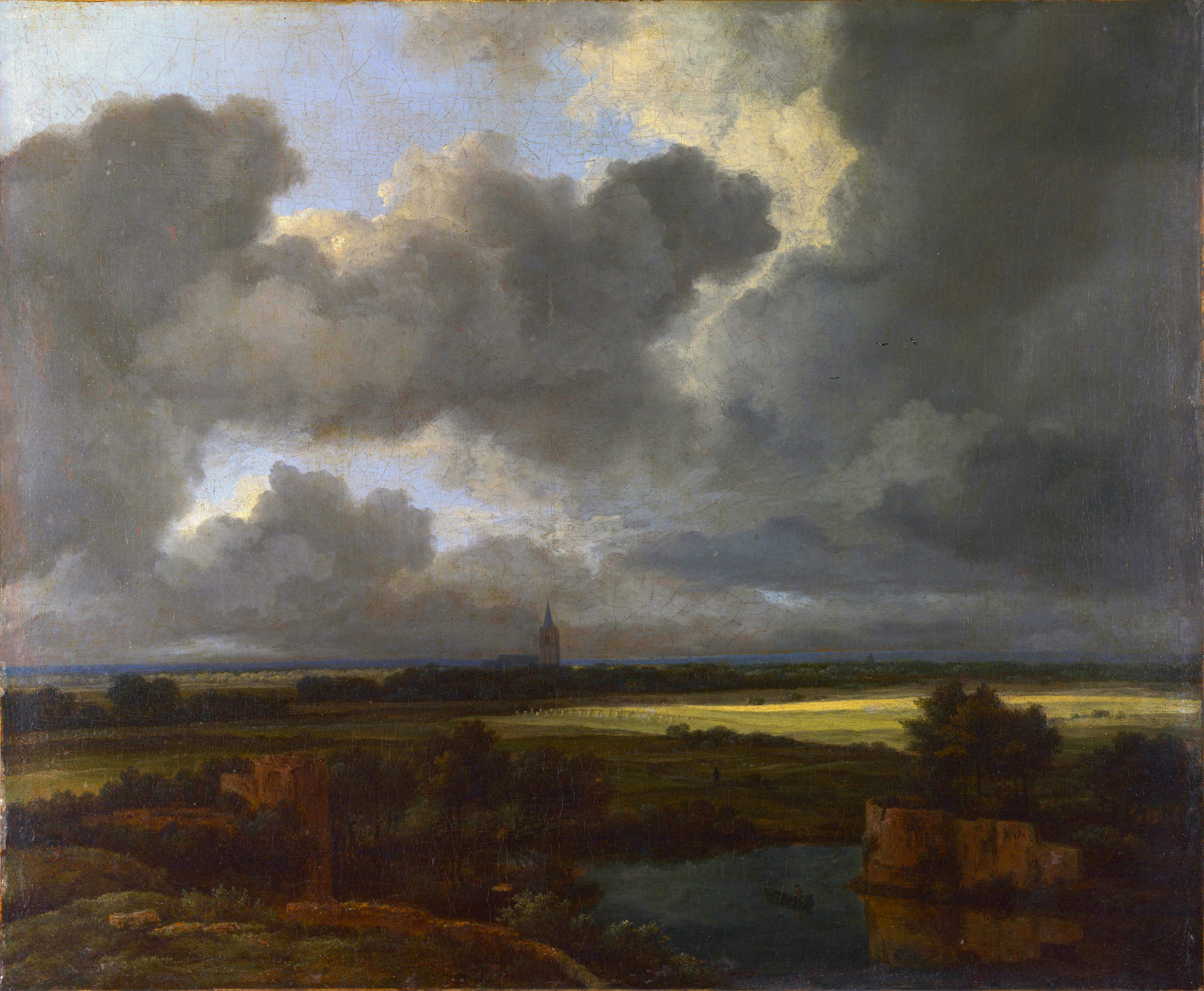
Cat. nr. 36, called A View of Beverwijk, also in the National Gallery

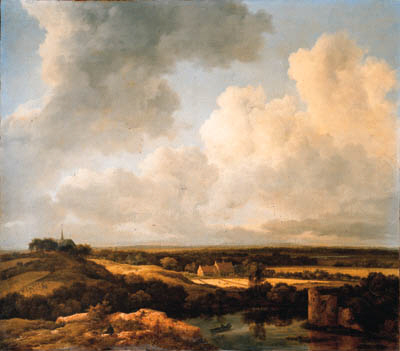
Cat. nr. 775 referred to above, called The Ruins of a Fort; Sold at Christie's in 1998

== See also ==
- List of paintings by Jacob van Ruisdael
