= A Woman Preparing Bread and Butter for a Boy =

Painting by Pieter de Hooch

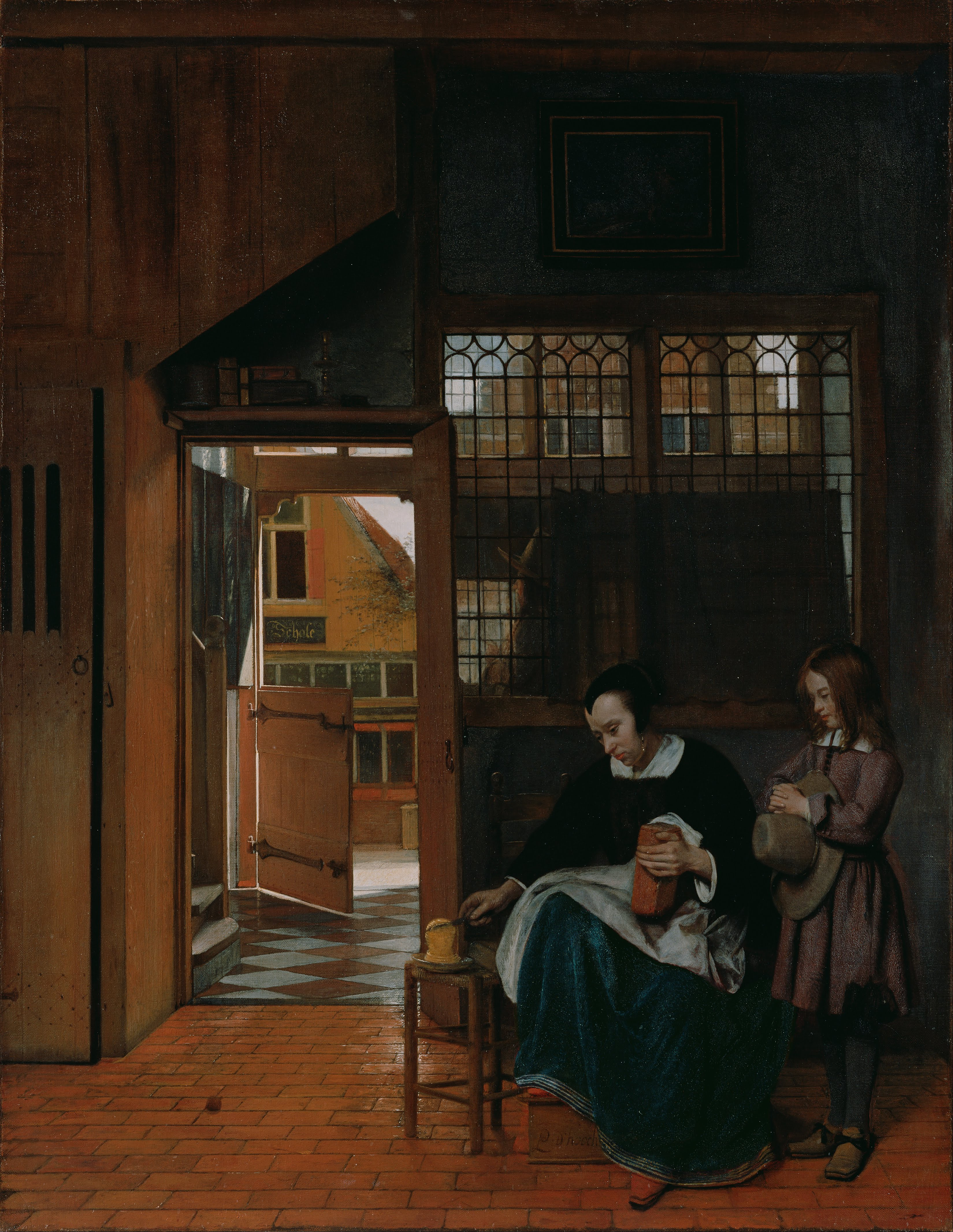
- Artist: Pieter de Hooch
- Year: 1660–1663
- Medium: oil on canvas
- Dimensions: 68.3 cm × 53 cm (26.9 in × 21 in)
- Location: Getty Center, Los Angeles

A Woman Preparing Bread and Butter for a Boy (1660–1663) is an oil-on-canvas painting by the Dutch painter Pieter de Hooch. It is an example of Dutch Golden Age painting and is part of the collection of the Getty Center, in Los Angeles, California.

This painting was documented by Hofstede de Groot in 1908, who wrote:

10. A WOMAN CUTTING BREAD AND BUTTER FOR A BOY, WHO IS SAYING GRACE. Sm. 54; deG. 48. In a room with a window at the back sits a woman, wearing a dark jacket and a blue skirt. She has a loaf of bread in her left hand, and is taking a piece of butter from a plate on a chair at her left. To her right stands a boy with folded hands, clasping his hat to his breast. The room is in subdued light. The open half-door of a passage with tiled floor beyond looks on the street; the ground before a house opposite is illumined by sunshine. Although the picture has not the brilliant effect so much esteemed, it is a very pleasing and satisfactory example. Canvas on panel, 26 inches by 20 1/2 inches. Mentioned by Waagen, Supplement, p. 342. Sales. Amsterdam (Hoet, ii. 288), April 16, 1750 (52 florins). Jan Gildemeester Jansz, Amsterdam, June 11, 1800 (415 florins, Yver). A. Meynts, Amsterdam, July 15, 1823 (1450 florins, Brondgeest). In the collection of the Baron J. G. Verstolk van Soelen, The Hague, sold in 1846 as a whole to Thomas Baring, Humphrey Mildmay, and Lord Overstone. Sale. Humphrey Bingham Mildmay,; London, June 24, 1893, No. 30 (£2625, Colnaghi and Lawrie). Now [in 1908] in the Drummond collection, Montreal.

According to the Getty it then came into the collections of Andrew W. Mellon and Heinrich Thyssen's Schloss Rechnitz before being purchased by them in 1984.

== See also ==
- List of paintings by Pieter de Hooch
