= Gerrit Zegelaar =

Dutch painter

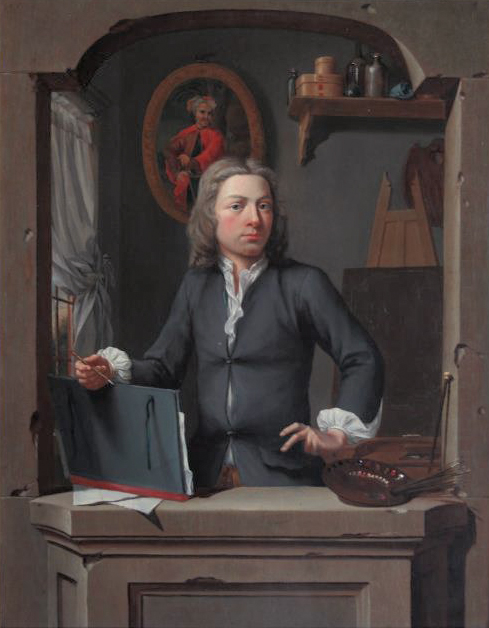
- Self-portrait by Gerrit Zegelaar
- Born: 16 July 1719; Loenen aan de Vecht
- Died: 24 July 1794 (aged 75); Wageningen

Gerrit Zegelaar (16 July 1719 – 24 July 1794) was a Dutch painter.

Zegelaar was born in Loenen aan de Vecht as son of the carpenter and alderman Hendrik Zegelaar and Johanna ter Bruggen. Gerrit was a deaf mute. He settled in Amsterdam where in 1757 he married Maria van der Steen. The marriage remained childless.

Zegelaar was a pupil of Nicolaas Verkolje and is known for small genre paintings that were often sold by pairs, and for portraits, but also made wall decorations. He worked in Haarlem and Amsterdam. He painted a wall decoration for the owner Quarles van Ufford on the house located at Spaarne 106. His works were collected by Gerrit Braamcamp and Jan Gildemeester.

In 1785 he was insolvent and left Amsterdam, but in 1788 met with financial trouble again and then left Utrecht where he had been living. He then retired to Wageningen, the city where his father had been born. Zegelaar died there six years later.

== Literature ==
- E. Munnig Schmidt, "Gerrit Zegelaar. Een 18e-eeuwse kunstschilder uit Loenen a/d Vecht", in Jaarboekje Oudheidkundig Genootschap Niftarlake 2002, p. 62-84
