= Lawrie & Co =

Lawrie & Co. (opened 1892, closed 1904) was an art dealership and gallery in London, England.

== Thomas Lawrie & Son ==
Thomas Lawrie (sometimes spelled as Laurie, not to be confused with Thomas Laurie the theatre sponsor) was a painter and paperhanger. Before 1850, he had opened Thomas Lawrie & Son at 126 Union Street in Glasgow, Scotland. By 1870, the business had moved to 85 Vincent Street and was advertising its "high-class" wares in the Glasgow Herald. Lawrie & Son sold fine art (especially Old Master and Romantic works) as well as antiques, furniture, and decorative objects. Moreover, a now-lost self-portrait by Vincent van Gogh might have passed through the hands of Lawrie & Co in the end of the 1880s. A letter from Theo van Gogh to Lawrie & Co. hints at such a sale (which would have been only the second known sale during the artist's lifetime). But the transaction does not show up in extant Lawrie & Co. record books and the letter may be a forgery. Moreover, the letter was addressed to Sulley and "Lori" of London in 1888, well before Lawrie & Co. had set up its London offices.

== Lawrie's Galleries, London ==
The Lawries opened their London gallery Lawrie & Co. in 1892, moving to 15 Old Bond Street in 1893. The Saturday Review literary journal praised the opening exhibition on Bond Street, which featured pieces by Diego Velázquez, George Romney, Thomas Gainsborough, John Constable, Jean-Baptiste-Camille Corot, and Jean-François Millet, as well as the "handsome" accompanying catalogue.

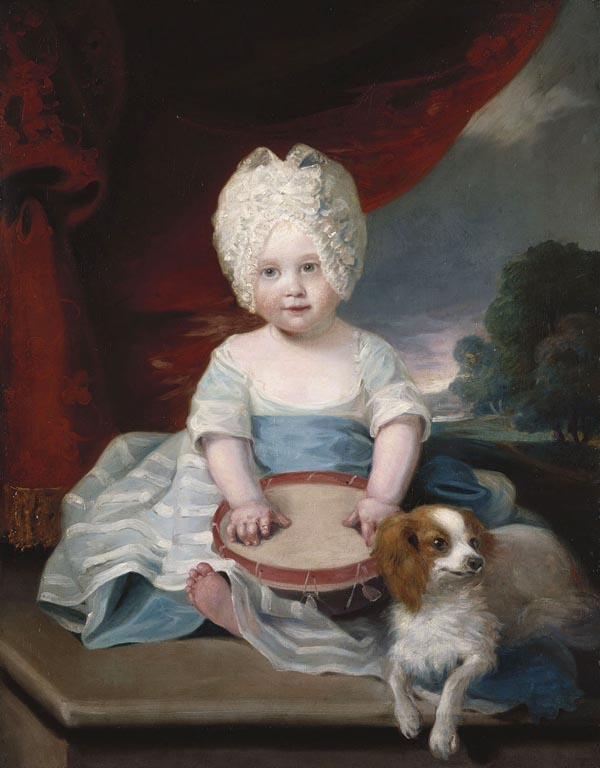
John Hoppner, Princess Amelia (1785), now in the Royal Collection Trust, UK.

The Morning Post also commended the "small but excellent collection of pictures." At the very end of the year, the gallery showed works by Jozef Israëls, Gheerardt David, and several British artists. In 1894, the London Morning Post described the gallery's guiding principle as “few but fit”: Lawrie & Co. exhibited fine works (including in that year, John Hoppner's portrait of Princess Amelia) but not many of them. In 1895, Lawrie & Co. exhibited more works by Corot, Charles-François Daubigny, Jean-François Millet, George Frederic Watts, and Edward Burne-Jones. In 1900, Lawrie & Co. exhibited a selection of early Italian artworks. By the turn of the twentieth century, Lawrie & Co. supplied virtually all Dutch masterworks entering the American market. Two years later, when the gallery moved to 159 New Bond Street, the building itself won praise in the press for its barrel-vaulted vestibule and coved ceilings. Another art dealership, a branch of Knoedler & Co. run by Charles Carstairs, moved into the 15 Old Bond Street space. An exhibition of English school masterworks - including ones by John Constable, J. M. W. Turner, William Holman Hunt, Joshua Reynolds, and John Everett Millais, all from the collection of Sir Cuthbert Quilter, 1st Baronet - was one of Lawrie's first in the new location. The gallery donated the admissions earnings to the King's Hospital Fund. In early 1903, an exhibition on seventeenth-century Dutch painting won praise from The Times of London as an exhibition of "more than average interest." It featured Portrait of the Artist's Sister and The Scribe by Rembrandt van Rijn, Portrait of a Boy Reading and another work by Frans Hals, Gerard ter Borch's Card Players, and Jacob Ruisdael's Outskirts of a Forest among thirty other pieces.

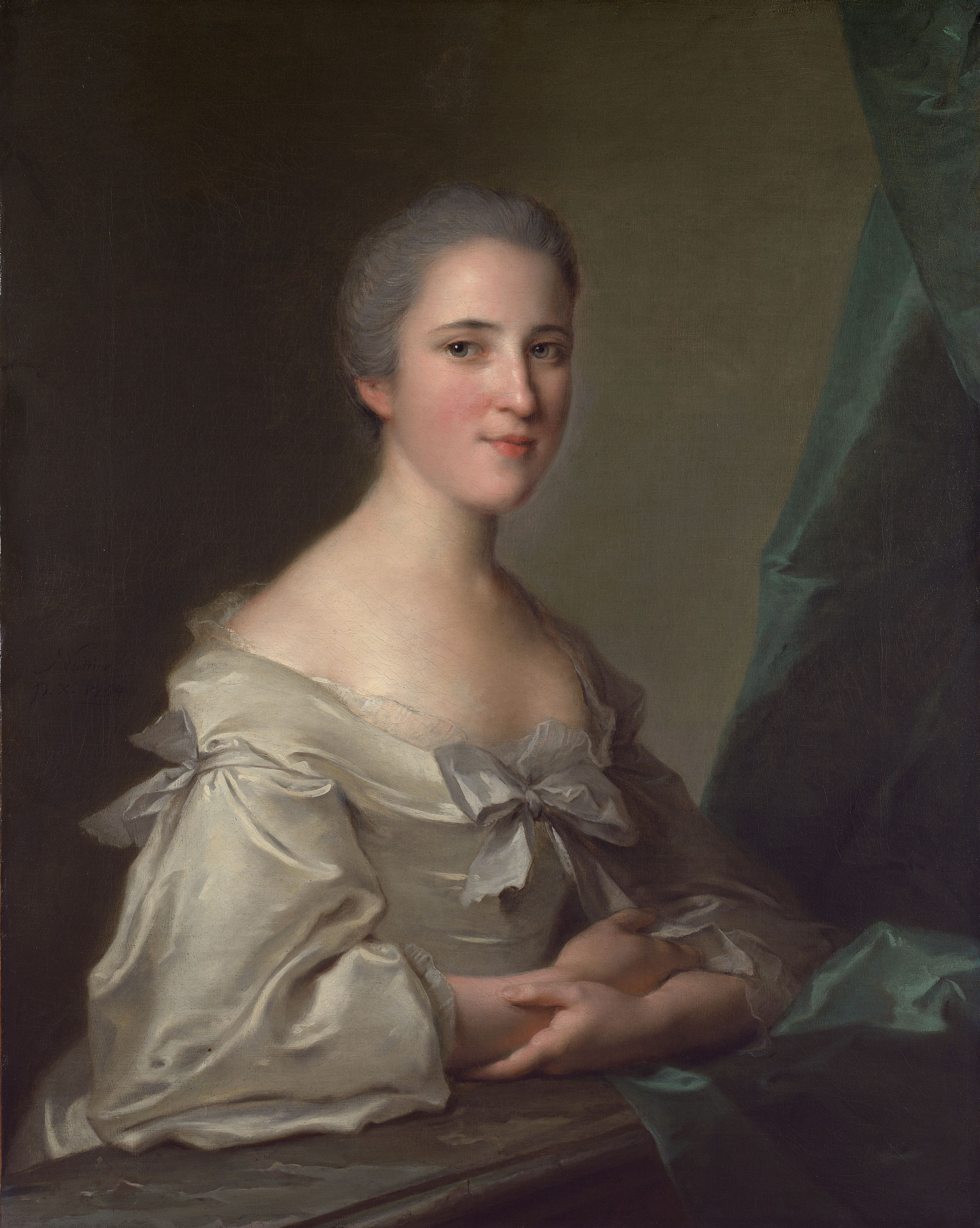
Jean-Marc Nattier, Elizabeth, Countess of Warwick (1754), originally sold to Henry Clay Frick in 1899, now at the Frick Collection, New York.

In its early twentieth century heyday, Lawrie's important clients included T. G. Arthur (Glasgow-based textile manufacturer), A. J. Kirkpatrick (president of the Royal Glasgow Institute of the Fine Arts), W. A. Coats (British industrialist), D. T. Watson (attorney), and Henry Clay Frick.

Notwithstanding its acclaim, Lawrie & Co. closed its two offices, at 159 New Bond Street, London and 85 St. Vincent Street Glasgow on October 31, 1904. By that time, William Duff Lawrie, John Mackillop Brown, and Arthur Joseph Sulley were its partners. Christie, Manson, and Wood (Christie's) auctioned off the defunct gallery's collection of art books. Lawrie, however, stayed in the art world loop: Carstairs, the new tenant of 15 Old Bond Street, wrote to Lawrie in February 1906 about the possible sale of Joshua Reynolds' Lady Harcourt, which he had owned jointly with Lawrie, to Frick.
