= Jan Gildemeester =

Dutch art collector

Jan Gildemeester Jansz.
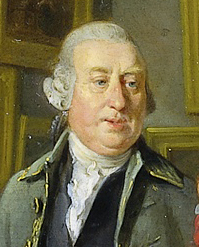
- Born: 1744; Lisbon
- Died: 1799 (aged 54–55); Amsterdam

Jan Gildemeester Jansz. (Lisbon, 1744 – Amsterdam, 1799) was a Dutch art collector.

== Biography ==
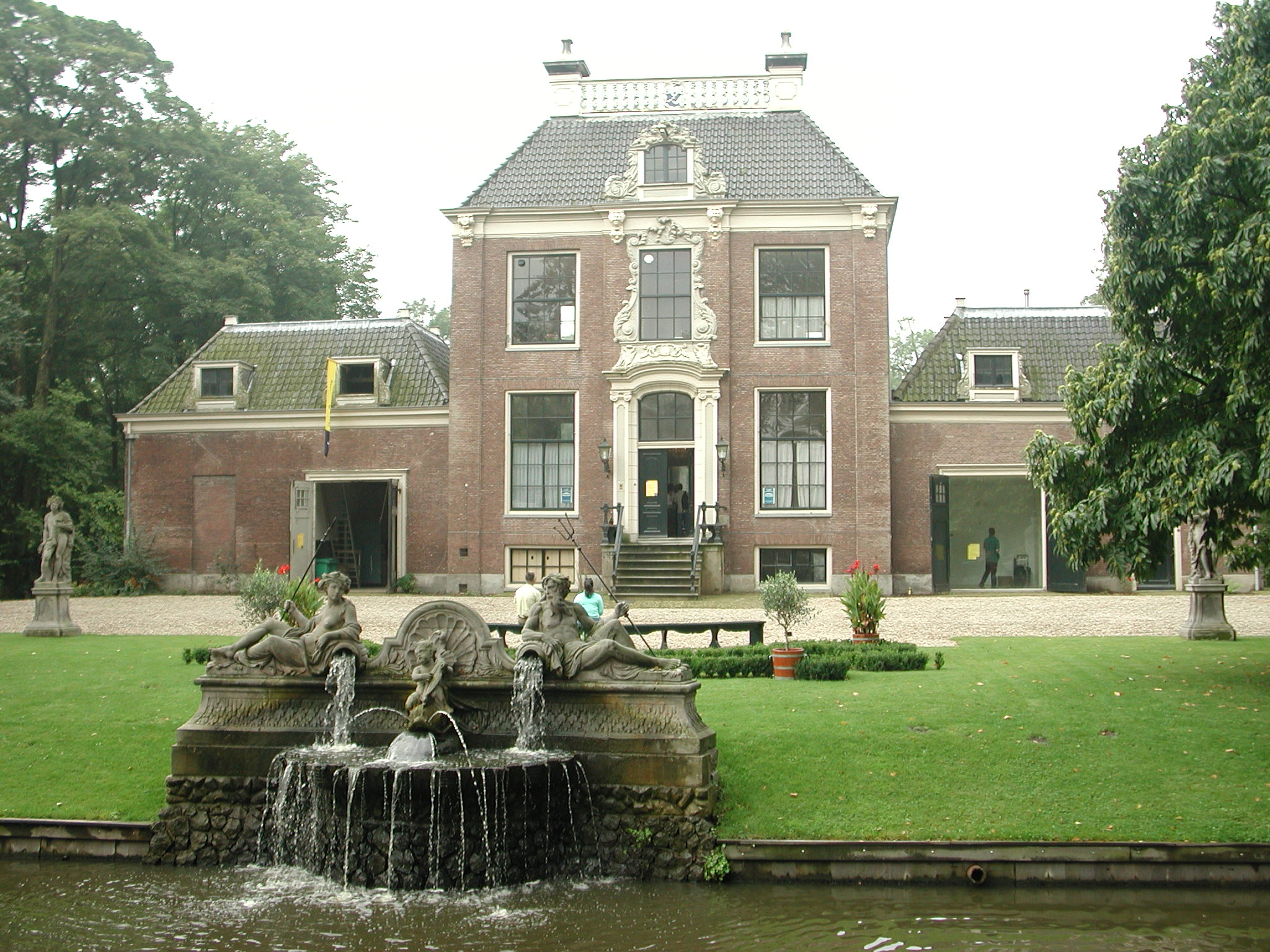
Huize Frankendael

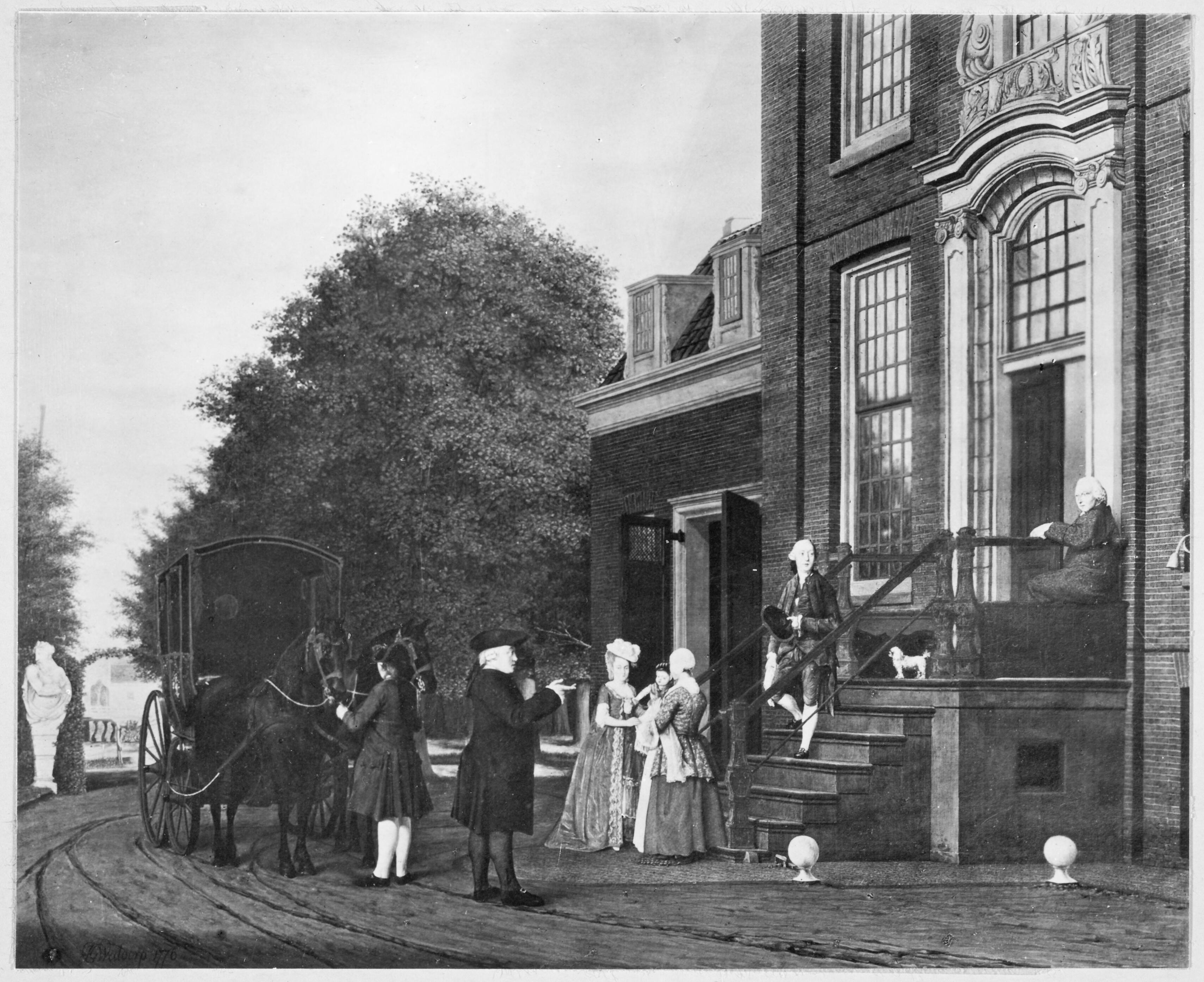
The Gildemeesters in front of Frankendael House, 1766

Jan's parents had moved to the Netherlands a few years after the 1755 Lisbon earthquake. He lived with his father in a house on the Keizersgracht in Amsterdam, where he began to form an art collection. He was involved in whaling and in 1778 was appointed as Portugal's agent and consul general to the Dutch Republic. Also in 1778 he donated nearly one hundred thousand guilders for Felix Meritis's house. In 1779 he inherited his father's country seat Frankendael in Watergraafsmeer - when a tree of liberty was placed (the ground was frozen too hard to plant it) on the Dam in Amsterdam in January 1795, it came from Gildemeester's garden. In 1792 he bought the prestigious stone-clad double canal mansion in the Gouden Bocht at 475 Herengracht which had been redecorated in the popular Louis XV style by Daniel Marot for the former owner, the wealthy widow Petronella van Lennep-de Neufville. She had the Jacob de Wit ceiling installed that can be seen in Gildemeester's art gallery painting, and she commissioned a wall decoration scheme for the parlour by Isaac de Moucheron and sculpted stucco decorations in the hallway and main staircase by Jan van Logteren. The mansion was a stately home in which Gildemeester could exhibit his art collection.

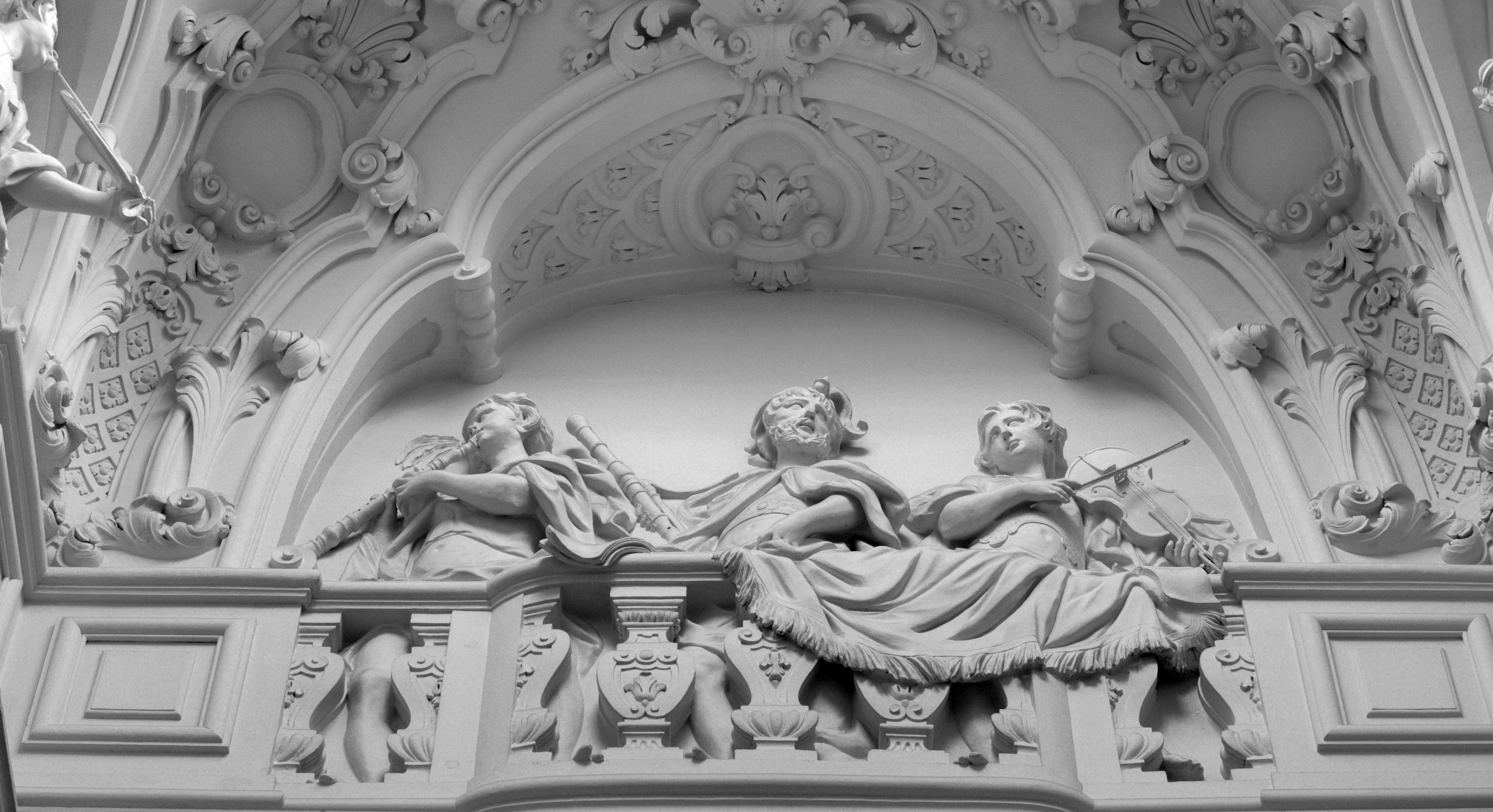
Stucco musicians overlook the staircase by Jan van Logteren

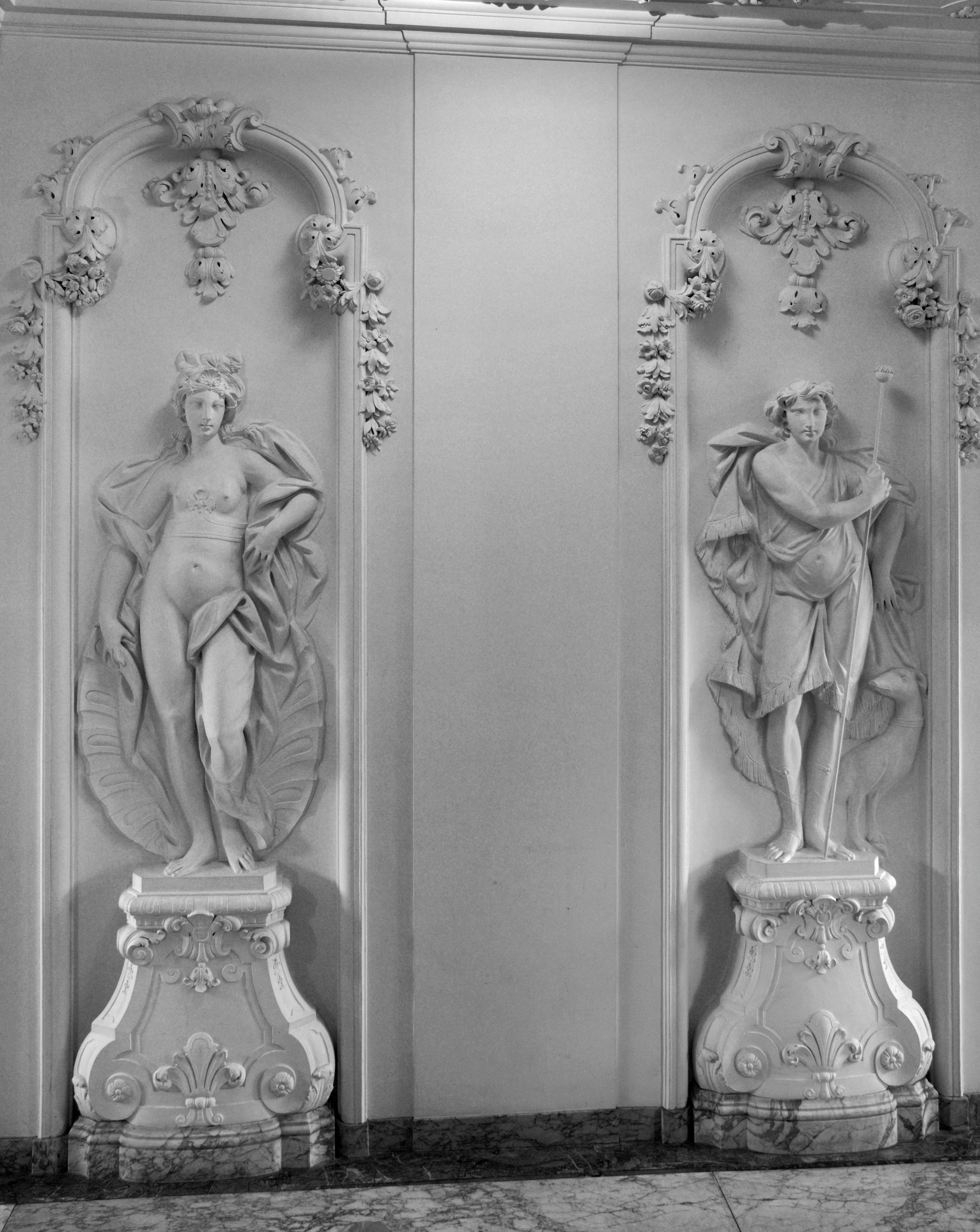
Venus and Adonis in the hallway by Jan van Logteren

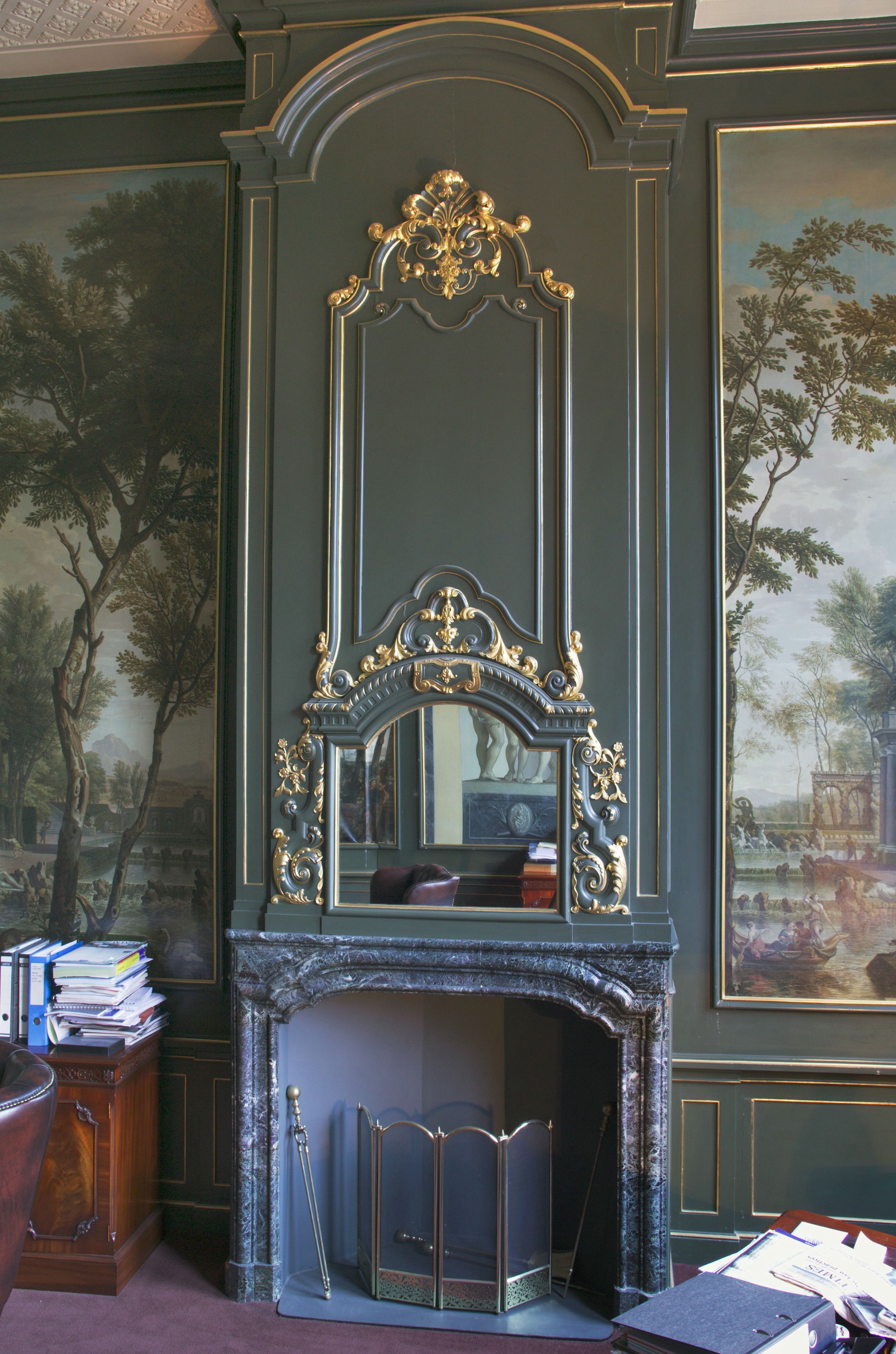
Fireplace in the parlour, flanked by Moucheron wall paintings

== Art gallery ==
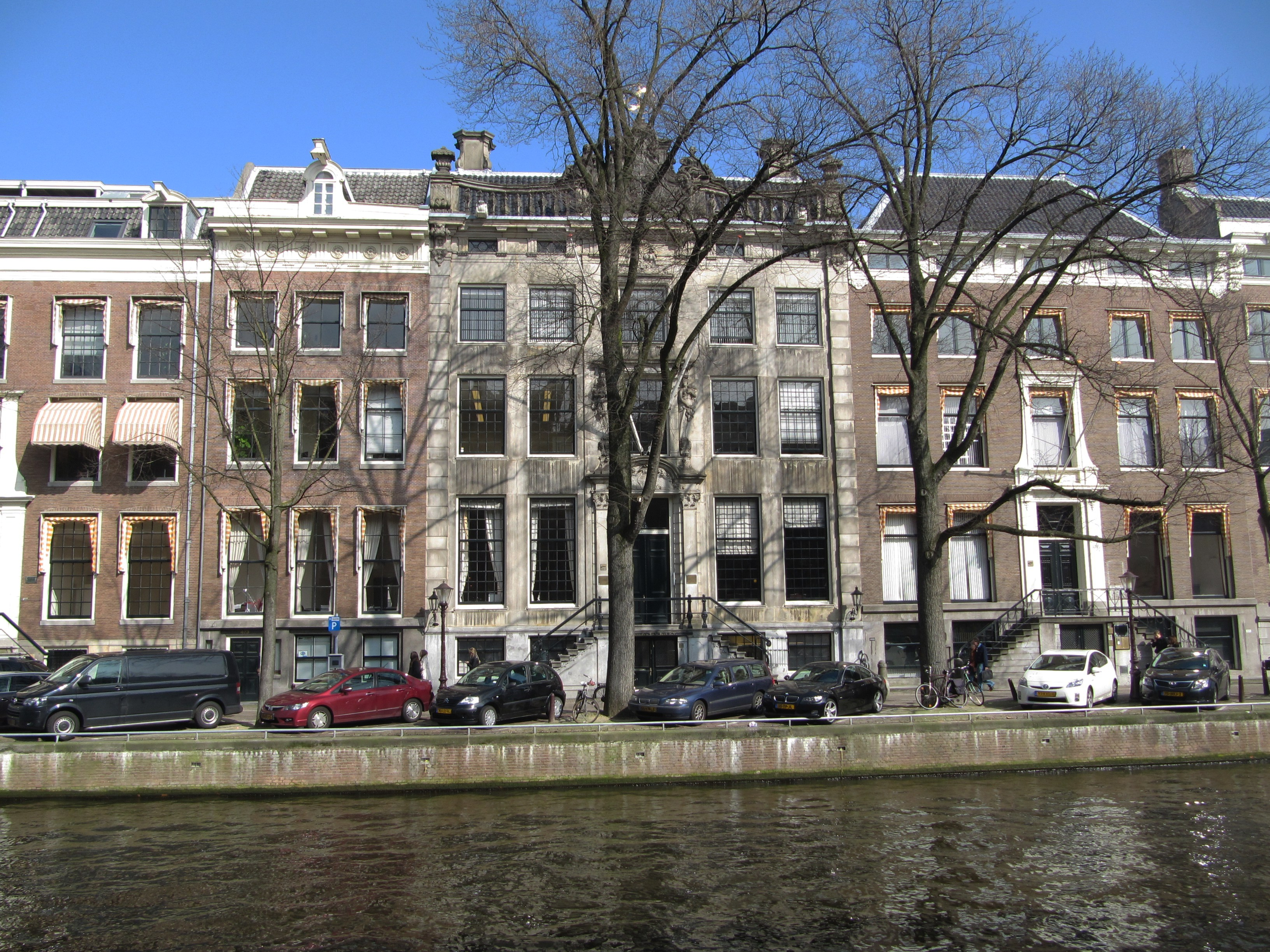
Huis De Neufville in the Gouden Bocht, home to his art gallery

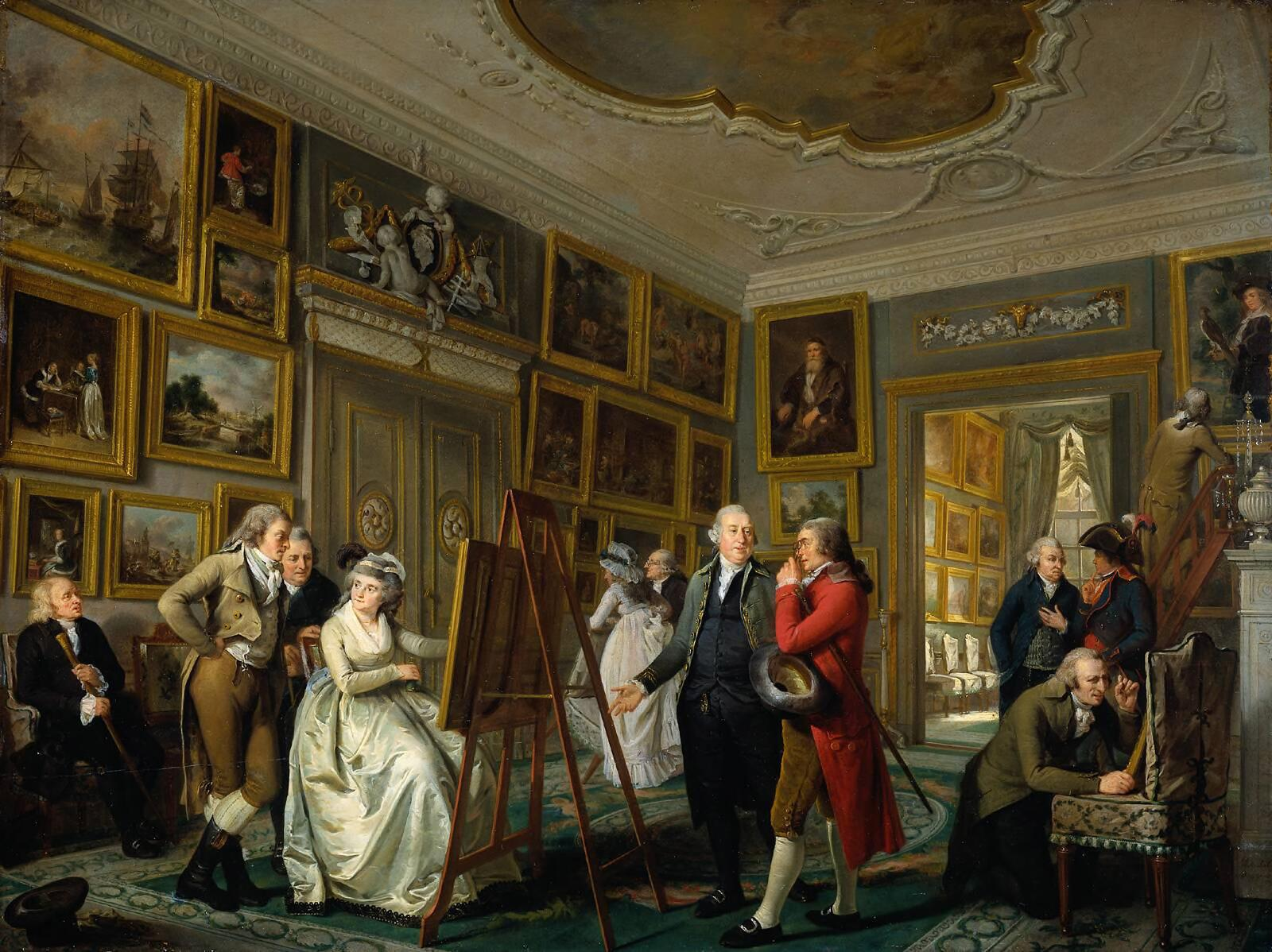
Adriaan de Lelie. The Art Gallery of Jan Gildemeester Jansz. 1794-1795. Amsterdam, Rijksmuseum Amsterdam.

In 1794-95 Adriaan de Lelie painted Gildemeester amid his collection, flanked by Jurriaan Andriessen and the sailor Cornelis Rudolphus Theodorus Krayenhoff, with de Lelie himself in the background. By his death in 1799 Gildemeester had built up a collection of over 300 paintings, including works by Jacob van Ruisdael, Meindert Hobbema, Pieter de Hoogh, Gabriel Metsu, Gerard ter Borch, Peter Paul Rubens and the French painter Jean-Baptiste Pillement. He also owned an extensive collection of drawings and prints. His works included Rembrandt's The ship builder Rijksen and his wife (now in the Royal Collection), Portrait of a Clergyman (1637) and The Healing of Old Tobias (1636). When his collection was auctioned in 1800, it raised 167,000 guilders, with the highest individual price being for Paulus Potter's The Milkmaid - cow painters like Potter and hare painters like Weenix were very popular at the end of the 18th century and the dawn of Romanticism. Several important paintings from the collection, such as Jan Asselijn's The Threatened Swan, ended up the Netherlands' national art gallery, which opened to the public in Huis ten Bosch but is now housed in the Rijksmuseum. Gildemeester was buried in the Lutheran church. His only heir was his niece Mary, who died in 1817.

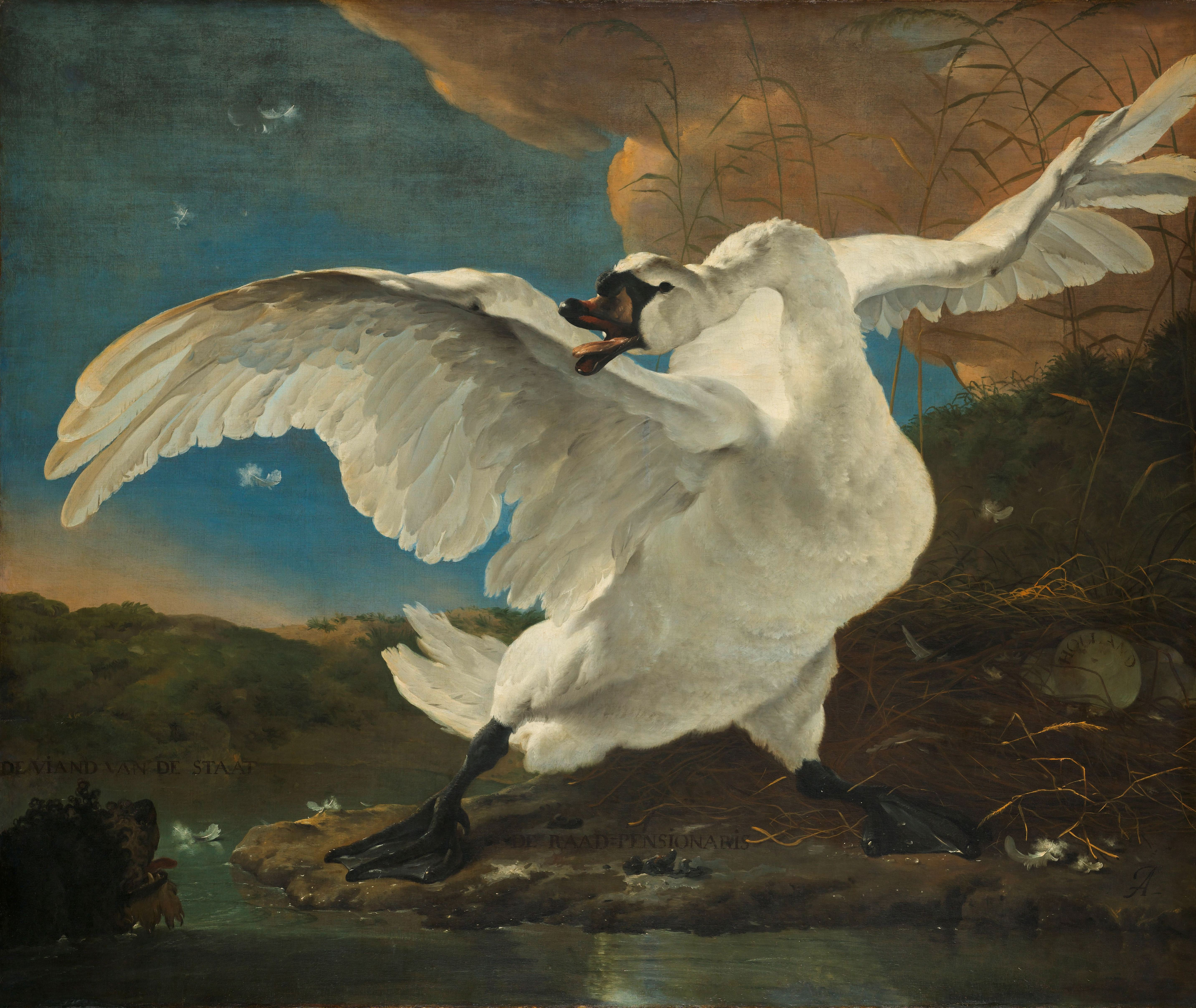
The Threatened Swan by Jan Asselijn, Rijksmuseum

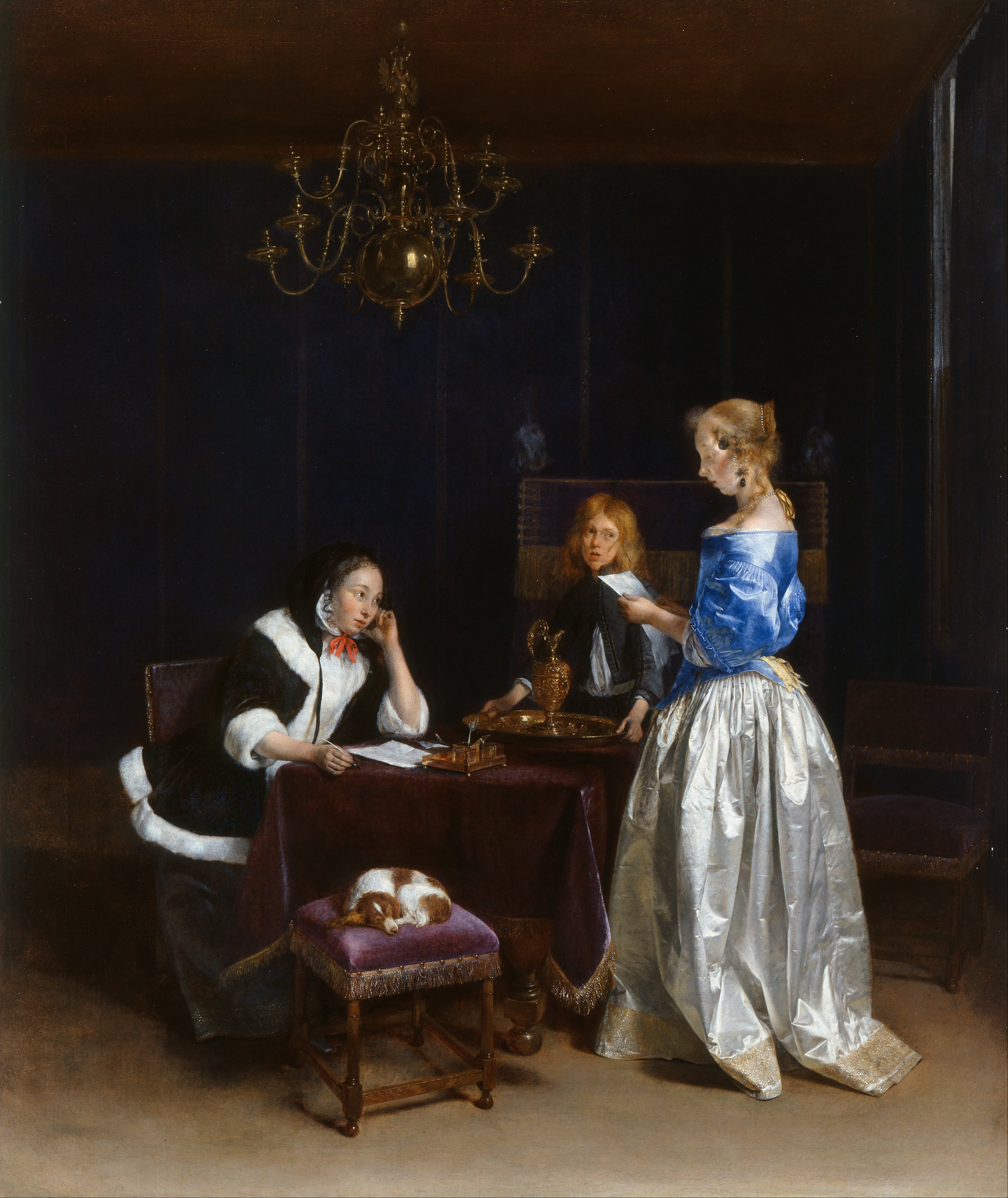
The Letter, by Gerard ter Borch, Royal Collection

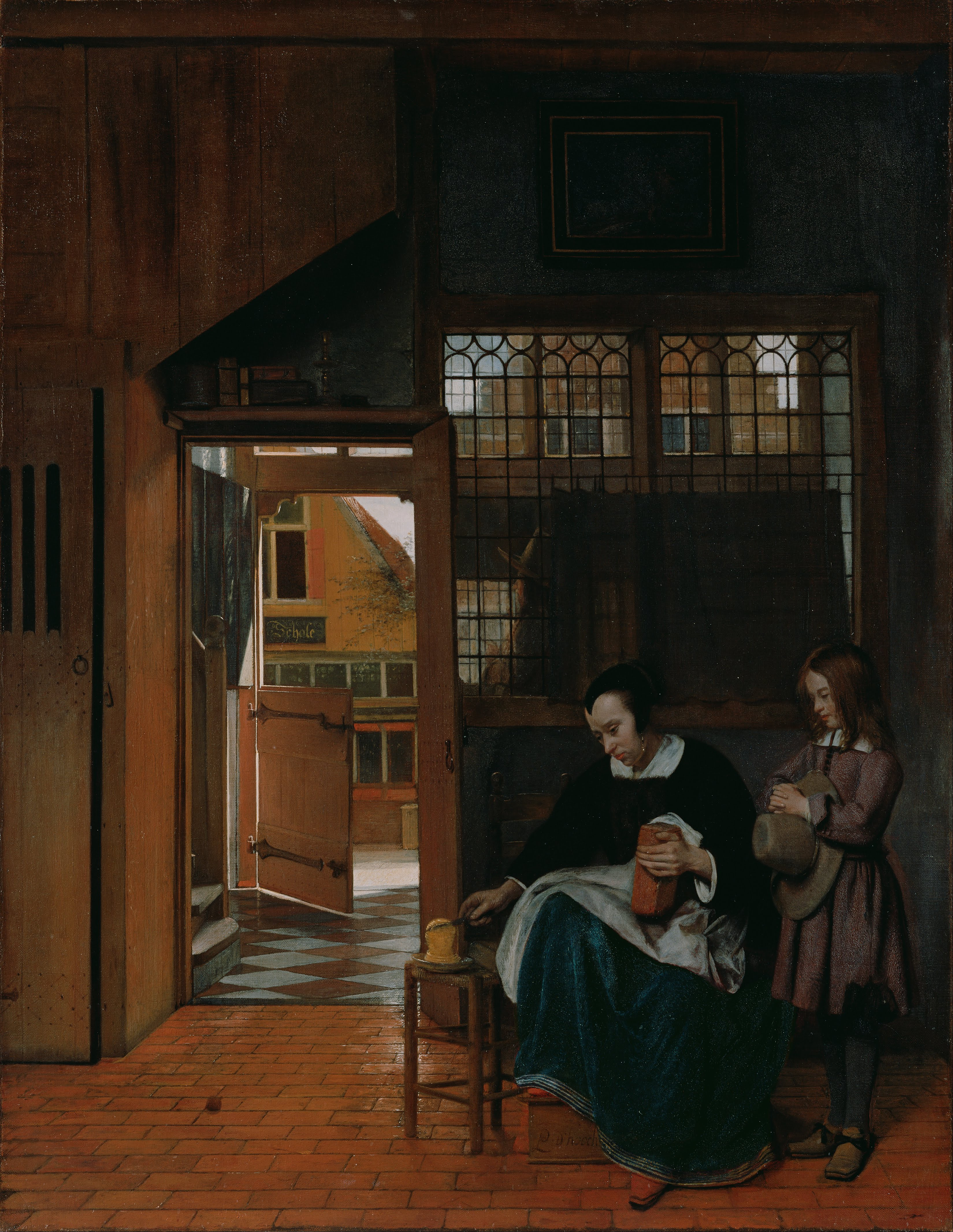
A Woman Preparing Bread and Butter for a Boy, by Pieter de Hooch, Getty Center

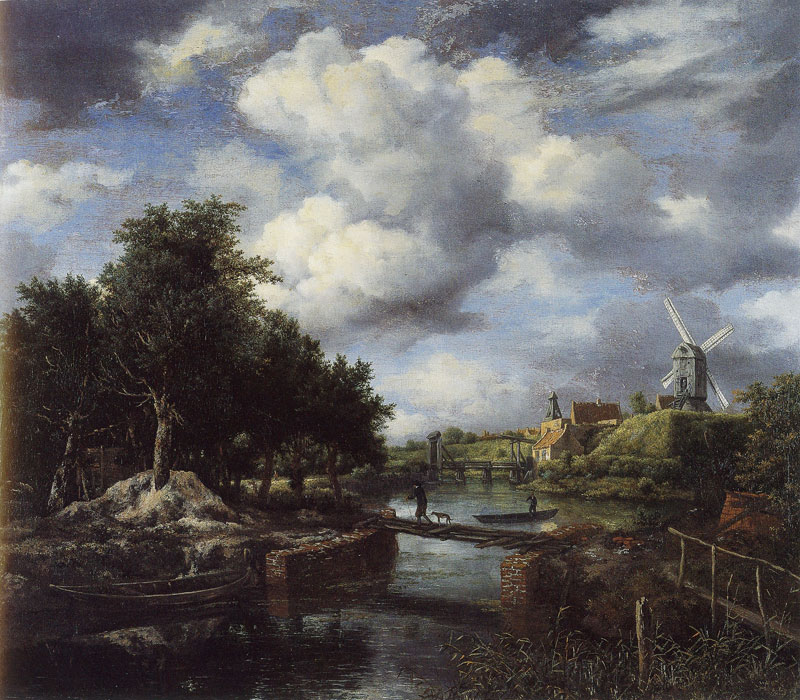
Landscape with a Windmill near a Town Moat, by Jacob van Ruisdael, private collection

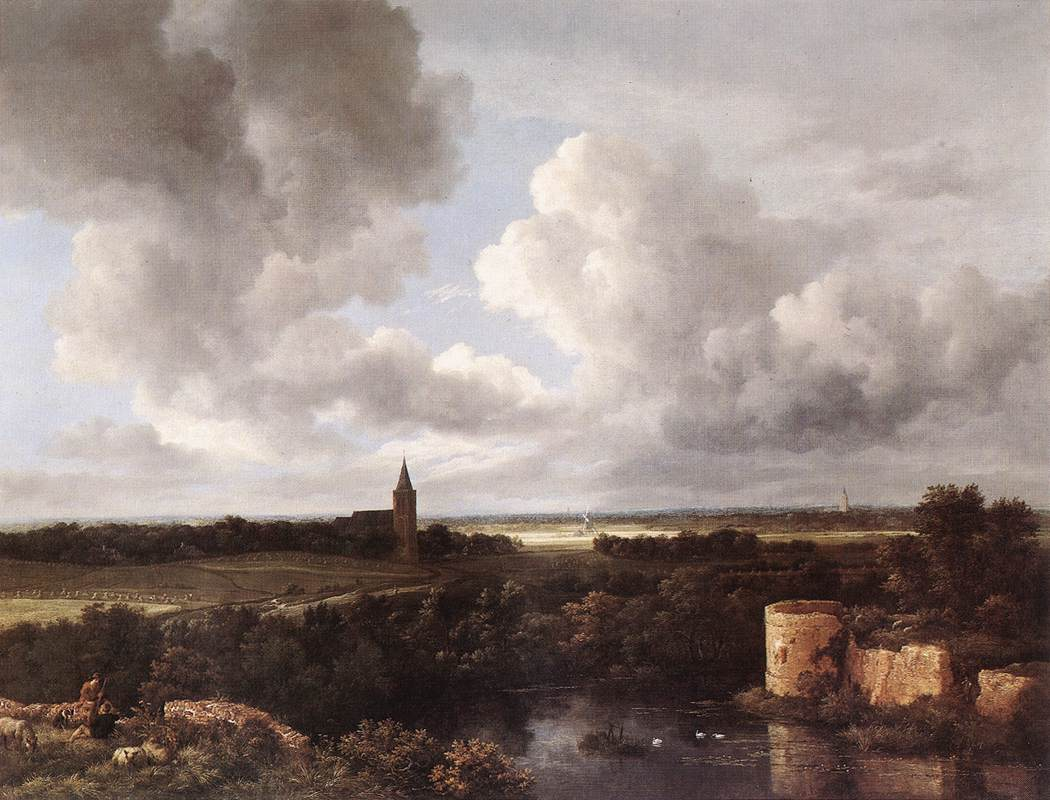
A Landscape with a Ruined Castle and a Church, by Jacob van Ruisdael, National Gallery

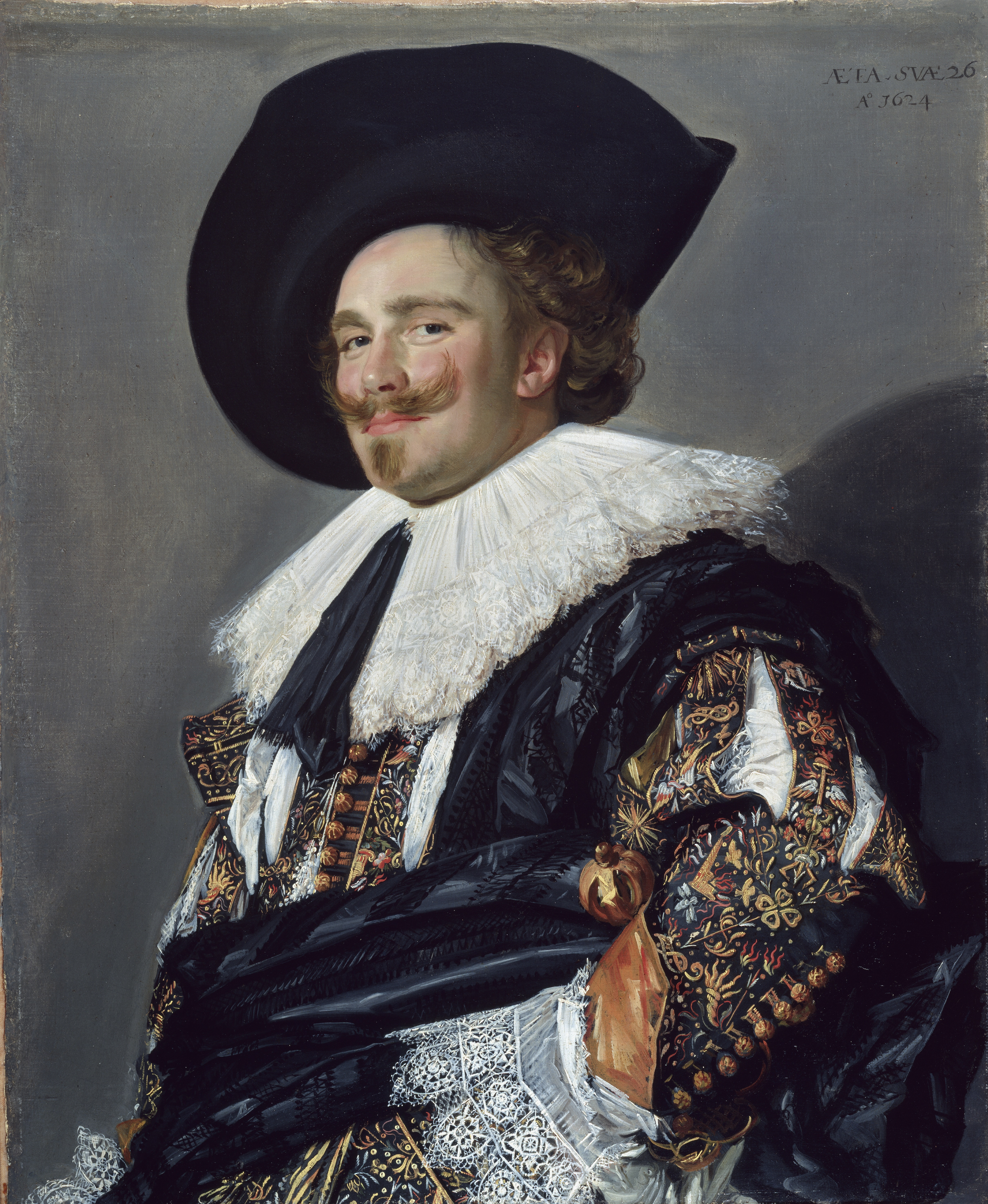
Laughing Cavalier, by Frans Hals, Wallace Collection

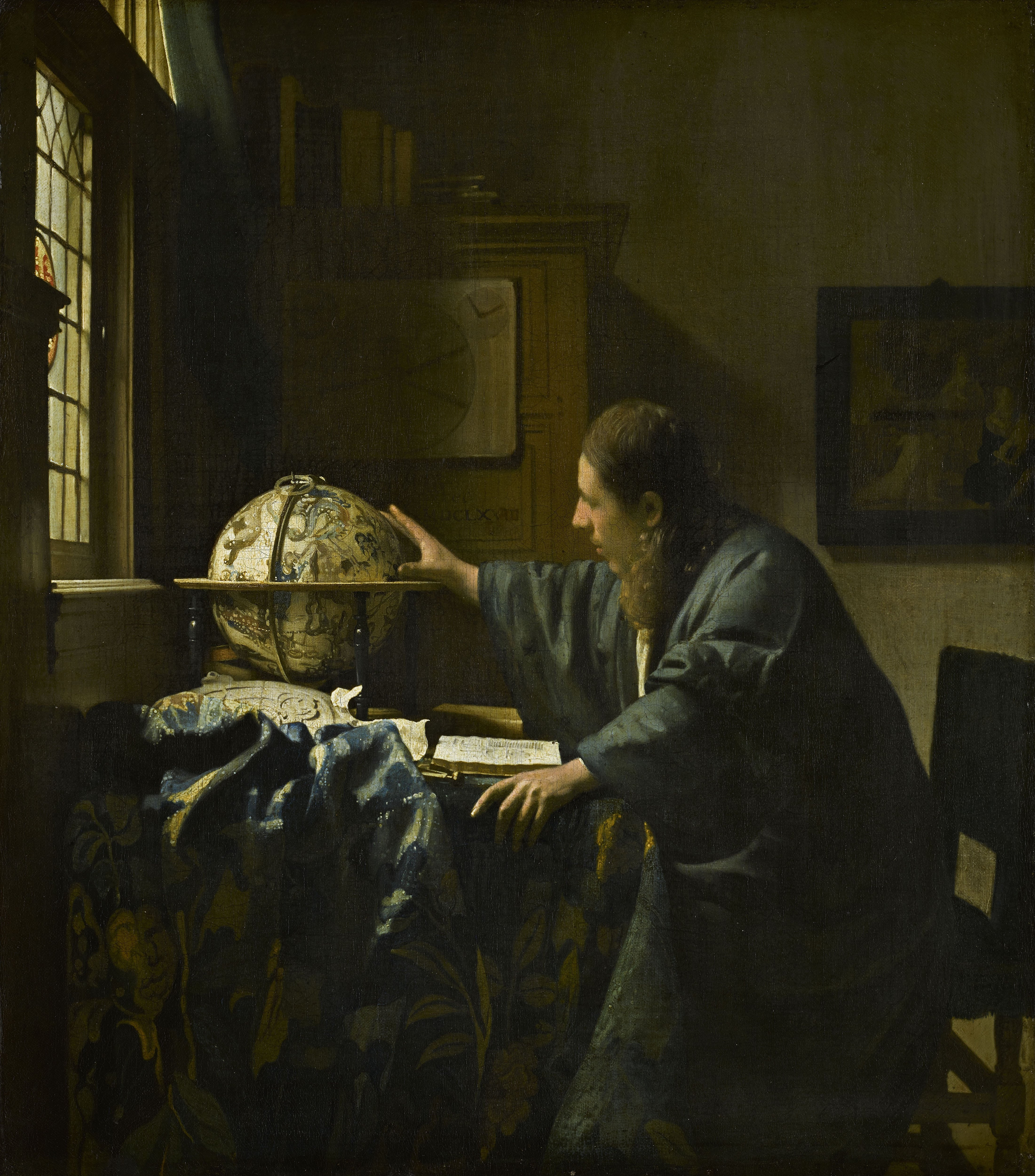
The Astronomer, by Johannes Vermeer, Louvre

== Sources ==
- Fuchs, J.M. (1967) Verzorgen en verplegen. Luthers diaconiehuis Amsterdam 1772 - 1967
- Lunsingh Scheurleer, Th.H. (1967) Het huis Herengracht 475 en zijn bewoners. Amstelodamum Jaarboek 1967, p. 78-105.
- C.J. de Bruyn Kops, 'De Amsterdamse verzamelaar Jan Gildemeester Jzn.', Bulletin van het Rijksmuseum 13 (1965), p. 79-114
