= John Smith (art historian) =

British art dealer (1781–1855)

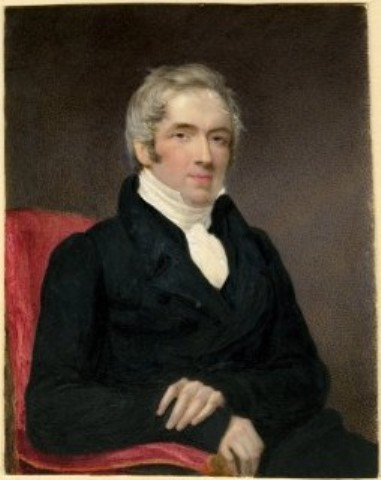
- Born: 1781; London
- Died: 1855 (aged 73–74); Hanwell

John Smith (1781–1855) was a 19th-century British art dealer who developed the concept of the catalogue raisonné.

Smith was born in London. He began dealing in art as a framemaker, specializing in wood-carving and gilding. He became an art dealer and art consultant known for his "reasoned catalog" of painters that he wrote in 8 volumes and sold by subscription to his art clients during the years 1829 to 1837, and to which he added a 9th volume as a supplement in 1842.

== Sources ==
- Volume 1 (1829): Gerard Dou, Pieter van Slingelant, Frans van Mieris the Elder, Willem van Mieris, Adriaen van Ostade, Isaac van Ostade, Philips Wouwerman
- Volume 2 (1830): Peter Paul Rubens
- Volume 3 (1831): Anthony van Dyck, David Teniers the Younger
- Volume 4 (1833): Jan Steen, Gerard ter Borch, Eglon van der Neer, Pieter de Hooch, Gonzales Coques, Gabriel Metsu, Caspar Netscher, Adriaen van der Werff, Nicolaes Maes, Godfried Schalcken
- Volume 5 (1834): Nicolaes Berchem, Paulus Potter, Adriaen van de Velde, Karel Dujardin, Aelbert Cuyp, Jan van der Heyden
- Volume 6 (1835): Jacob van Ruysdael, Meindert Hobbema, Jan Both, Andries Both, Jan Wynants, Adam Pynacker, Jan Hackaert, Willem van de Velde, Ludolf Bakhuizen, Jan van Huysum, Rachel Ruysch
- Volume 7 (1836): Rembrandt
- Volume 8 (1837): Nicolas Poussin, Claude Lorrain, Jean-Baptiste Greuze
- Volume 9 – Supplement (1842): Includes corrections to the preceding volumes and new additions

== Death ==
Smith died in Hanwell. His work was carried on and expanded by Cornelis Hofstede de Groot, who published a new update to his catalogue in German starting in 1907, that was later expanded and translated into English by Edward G. Hawke, along with a concordance of catalog numbers.
