= Elie Luzac =

Dutch jurist, journalist, writer and book-seller

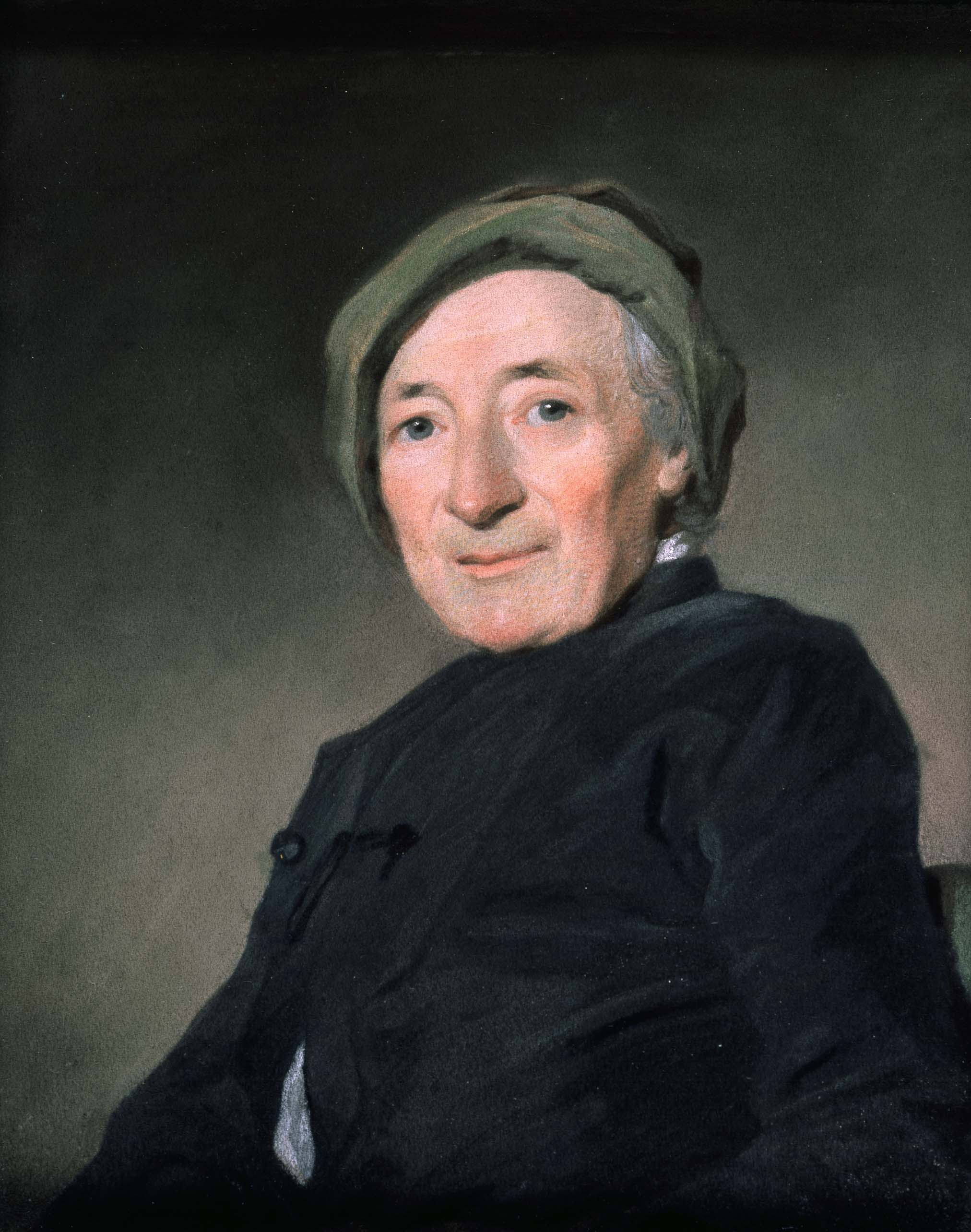
Elie Luzac, anonymous painting

Elie Luzac (19 October 1721 in Noordwijk – 11 May 1796 in Leiden) was a Dutch jurist, journalist, writer of philosophical, historical and political literature, and book-seller, who was considered an important ideologue of the "democratic wing" of the Orangist movement, both after the Orangist restoration in the Dutch Republic in 1748, and during the Patriottentijd.

== Personal life ==
Luzac was the son of Elie Luzac, a Huguenot from Bergerac, who had a boarding school in Noordwijk, and Anna Maria Cabrolle. He was a nephew of Etienne Luzac and Jean Luzac senior, both booksellers, and a cousin of Jean Luzac, also a publisher and journalist. He was three times married, first with Augustine Ernestine Tick in Hamburg on 3 November 1750; next to a miss Massuet; and finally to the widow Cabryn-In 't Hout.

He studied the Classics under Tiberius Hemsterhuis and mathematics and physics under Pieter van Musschenbroek and Johan Lulofs at Leiden University. During these studies he became a follower of the philosophy of Gottfried Wilhelm Leibniz and Christian Wolff, which he would remain all his life.

== Career ==
After he finished his formal studies he wrote a so-called Disquisitio politico-moralis about the question Num civis innocens irae hostis longe potentioris juste permitti possit, ut excidium totius civitatis evitetur (Note: Whether an innocent citizen justly can be surrendered to the wrath of a far more potent enemy, to avoid the destruction of the whole community?) in 1749. But only in 1759 did he receive a law degree with the dissertation Specimen juris inaugurale de modo procedendi extra ordinem in causis criminalibus. (Note: Introduction to the extraordinary (i.e. non-civil) procedure in criminal cases)

He practiced law, but was more attracted to the study of jurisprudence, especially natural law, and in 1753 he published a "Leibnizian" natural-law treatise entitled le Bonheur ou nouveau système de jurisprudence naturelle, followed in 1756 by Recherches sur quelques principes des connoissances humaines along the same lines. The wish to give these ideas a wider circulation encouraged him in 1759 to found a new literary magazine, entitled the Nederlandsche Letter Courant. This folded in 1763, but he continued writing articles in two other periodicals, the Bibliothèque Impartiale and the Bibliothèque des Sciences.

In this period he also published a work on Ethics entitled Verhandeling over de volmaking der zedeleer door de Openbaring (Note: Treatise about the perfection of morality through Revelation.) (1761) and commented on Montesquieu's l'Esprit des Lois in his Remarques philosophiques et politiques d'un Anonyme sur l'Esprit des Lois (1765). He was critical of Jean-Jacques Rousseau, with whom he conducted a polemic in his Lettre d'un Anonyme à M.J.J. Rousseau (opposing Contrat Social; 1766) and Seconde lettre d'un anonyme à M.J.J. Rousseau (opposing Emile; 1767).

In his Briefwisseling van Philagathos en Philalethes over de leer van het zedelijk gevoel (Note: Correspondence between Philagathos and Philalethes about the doctrine of moral feeling.) (1771) he opposed "moral feeling" as the basis of ethics, and in 1772 he edited and published the works of his hero Christian Wollf under the title Les Institutions du Droit de la Nature et des Gens de Wolff. His own ideas in this matter were laid down in Du Droit Naturel civil et politique, en forme d'entretiens, which was only partially and posthumously published in 1802.

Starting in 1742 Luzac worked as a publisher in Leiden. He published 'L'homme machine by the Materialist philosopher Julien Offray de La Mettrie which brought him to the unwelcome attention of the censors in the form of the Consistory of the Walloon church congregation in Leiden, that accused him of defending "materialism". He defended himself in l'Homme plus que machine (1748) and l'Essai sur la liberté de produire ses sentimens (1749) In later years, after the traditional freedom of the press in the Republic appeared under threat by a 1765 law introducing censorship, he expanded on the legal and philosophical justifications of the freedom of speech in Request van Cornelis van Hoogeveen .... Benevens een Memorie Tot apui van 't Request bij hetzelve gevoegd (Note: Petition of Cornelis van Hoogeveen ... with a memorandum to support the petition, attached to same.) (1770), and possibly also the anonymous pamphlet Brief van een Regent van eene Hollandsche Stad, rakende de Drukpers, (Note: Letter of a regent of a Dutch city with regard to the Press.) though this is not certain.

Luzac himself made good use of the freedom of expression and the press. He was an ardent partisan of the cause of the "democrats" who were in league with the Orangists during the popular revolt of 1747, but where other "democrats" were disappointed in the stadtholder William IV, he remained loyal even after the latter's death in 1751. In 1754 he anonymously published Het gedrag der Stadhoudersgezinden, verdedigt door Mr. A.V.K. Rechtsgeleerden, (Note: The conduct of the adherents of the stadtholder, defended by Mr. A.V.K. Jurists) a polemic against the critics of the stadtholderate. This pamphlet was banned and publicly burned in Amsterdam by the city government, and a bounty was promised for the denunciation of its author.

More publicly he polemicized with Jan Wagenaar in the so-called Witten-Oorlog, a running battle about the history of the controversy between the stadtholders and the Dutch States Party Regenten like Johan de Witt. In Luzac's view the Grand Pensionary de Witt and his doctrine of the "True Freedom" that he espoused during the First Stadtholderless Period, undermined the very foundations of the Dutch state, weakening the sovereignty which in his view springs from the people, and which (he argued) in the days of the Dutch Revolt they had entrusted to the States General of the Netherlands and William the Silent, and not (as de Witt had argued) to the States of the several provinces. It was "the people" who according to Luzac had brought about the overturning of the regimes of 1572 (Spanish), 1618 and 1672 (States Party in several manifestations) and that made it "legitimate" in his view. Wagenaar ridiculed in his turn the legitimacy which the Orangists claimed for themselves, though he admitted that legitimacy ultimately derives from the people, and defended de Witt's system In the context of this polemic Luzac published De Zugt van den .... raadpensionaris Johan de Witt, tot zijn Vaderland en deszelfs Vrijheid (Note: The ambition ... of Grand Pensionary Johan de Witt, for his Fatherland and its Freedom) (1757) and Het Oordeel over den raadpensionaris Johan de Witt (Note: The Judgment on Grand Pensionary Johan de Witt.) (1757), and possibly also Zedige Beproeving (Note: Moral Ordeal) (though this is not certain).

Like other Orangists he was in favor of the traditional alliance with Great Britain, and in 1758 he protested the anti-British mood in the Dutch Republic caused by the events of the Seven Years' War (in which the Republic remained neutral) in his Toets voor het Onderzoek van Groot-Brittanniens Gedrag, ten opzigte van Holland. (Note: Test for the inquest into Great Britain's conduct toward Holland.) In the matter of the American Revolution Luzac was pro-British (and anti-American) also, as witnessed by his writings in the Annales Belgiques between 1772 and 1776. In this he went against the sense of the times, in bundled pamphlets like Reinier Vrijaards Openhartige Brieven (Note: Reinier Vrijaard's Candid Letters.) (1781-1784) and Vaderlandsche Staatsbeschouwer (Note: Patriotic critic of the state.) (1784-1790). He also was on the side of the stadtholder William V during the political strife of the Patriottentijd and opposed the Patriots and Patriot newspapers, like the Post van den Neder-Rhijn and the Gazette de Leyde, published by his cousin Jean Luzac.

However, his historical work in the field of Economic history has contributed most to his reputation. He published La Richesse de la Hollande by Joseph Accarias de Sérionne in 1768 and 1778, but also edited a Dutch edition of this work, entitled Hollands Rijkdom, behelzende den oorsprong van den koophandel en van de magt van dezen staat (Note: Holland's Wealth, referring to the origin of the trade and the might of this state.) (1780-1783), which contained much of his own work. In 1778 he translated and published Jacob Nicolas Moireauu's Les devoirs du Prince, ou Discours sur la justice under the title De Pligten der Overheden of vertoog over de Regtvaardigheid. (Note: The duties of the authorities, or discourse about justice.)

Luzacs final work was Brief over het gevaar, gelegen in de verandering van de Staatsregeling van een eenmaal gevestigd Bestuur (Note: Letter about the danger of changing the constitution of a government once it has been established.) in which he defended the stadtholderian regime that was established after the Prussian invasion of Holland and "guaranteed" by the Act of Guarantee of 1788. But he lived long enough to see the Batavian Revolution of 1795 and the foundation of the Batavian Republic, which he must have detested.

He died in 1796 in Leiden.

== Works ==
- 1748 - L’homme plus que machine, London (=Leiden, Elie Luzac junior)
- 1749 - Essai sur la liberté de produire ses sentimens, Au pays libre pour le bien public (=Leiden, Elie Luzac junior)
- 1753 - Le bonheur, ou Nouveau système de jurisprudence naturelle, Berlin (=Leiden, Elie Luzac junior)
- 1754 - Het gedrag der stadhouders-gezinden, verdedigt door A. v. K.
- 1757 - Het oordeel over den heere raadpensionaris Johan de Witt.
- 1757 - De zugt van den heere raadpensionaris Johan de Witt.
- 1758 - Toets voor het onderzoek van Groot-Brittanniëns gedrag.
- 1765 - Lettre d’un anonime à monsieur J.J. Rousseau [sur le contrat social].
- 1766 - Seconde lettre d’un anonime à J.J. Rousseau, Paris, Desaint & Saillant (=Leiden, Elie Luzac).
- 1759-1763 - Nederlandsche letter-courant.
- 1771 - Philagathos (=F. Vaster), Philalethes(=Elie Luzac), Briefwisseling over de leer van het zedelijk gevoel; uitg., en met een voorbericht en aanmerkelyk vermeerdert door Johannes Petsch, (Utrecht, Johannes van Schoonhoven).
- 1772 - Christian Friedrich von Wolff, Institutions du droit de la nature et des gens.
- 1778 - Jacques Accarias de Sérionne, La richesse de la Hollande (edited by Elie Luzac, François Bernard), London n.d.(=Leiden, Luzac & Van Damme).
- 1779 - Jacob Nicolas Moreau, De pligten der overheden [...] Uit het Fransch vertaald. Zynde by deeze vertaaling gevoegd eene voor-reden, en eenige aantekeningen van Mr. Elias Luzac, Advt.
- 1780 - Hollands rijkdom.
- 1781 - Het waare dag-licht van het politieck systema der regeringe van Amsterdam (Middelburg, Abrahams)

== Sources ==
- Aa, A.J. van der (1865). "Elie Luzac in: Biographisch woordenboek der Nederlanden. Deel 11". Digitale Bibliotheek voor de Nederlandse Letteren (in Dutch). pp. 752–756.
- Brugmans, H. (1911). "Luzac, Mr. Elie in:P.J. Blok en P.C. Molhuysen (eds), Nieuw Nederlandsch biografisch woordenboek. Deel 1". Digitale Bibliotheek voor de Nederlandse Letteren (in Dutch). pp. 1287–1290.
- Israel, J.I. (1995). The Dutch Republic: Its Rise, Greatness and Fall, 1477–1806. Oxford History of Early Modern Europe. ISBN 0-19-873072-1.
