= Witten-Oorlog =

1750s pamphlet war between Jan Wagenaar and Elie Luzac

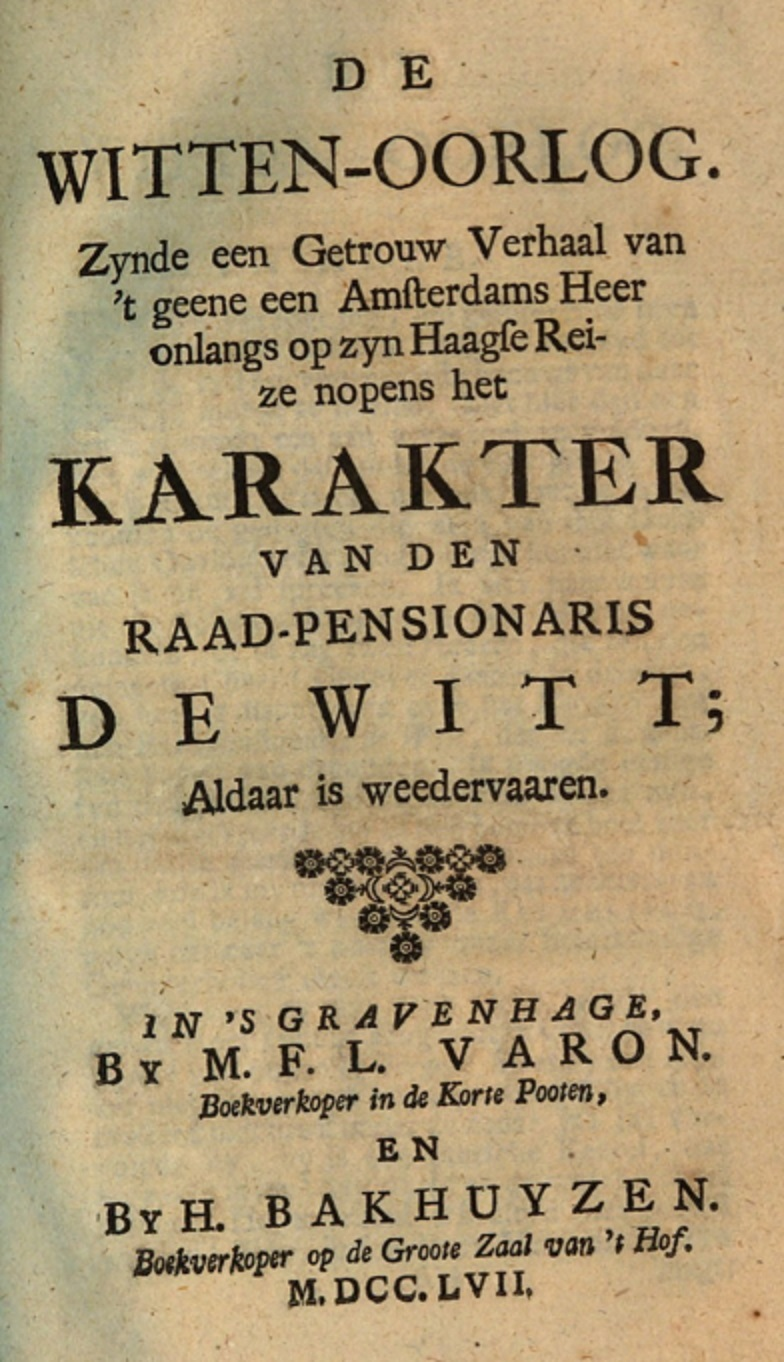
Title page of one of many publications on the Witten-Oorlog, 1757

The Witten-Oorlog (Witts War) was a 1750s pamphlet war between the Dutch historian Jan Wagenaar and the Dutch lawyer and book-seller Elie Luzac.

== Topics of the historical and political dispute ==
The main subject was whether or not the Witt brothers' execution by the people was justified and whether or not they were enemies of the state. Specifically, the pamphleteers disagreed on the wisdom of the Act of Seclusion, a secret annex in the Treaty of Westminster (1654) between the United Provinces and the Commonwealth of England in which William III, Prince of Orange, was excluded from the office of Stadtholder.

== Subtext of the dispute ==
The historian Pieter Geyl claimed that the true cause of the argument was based on the restoration of the government in 1748 and Wagenaar's freshly written history of Johan de Witt in 1749. A book was written about the subject in 1757, by which time the tempers had calmed down, though the parties had never agreed.

== Alleged allegorical depiction ==
It has been speculated that the white text that was painted onto the painting by Jan Asselijn known as The Threatened Swan was done in this period. The painting, which supposedly symbolizes Johan de Witt as a white swan protecting his country's eggs from an Orangist dog, was purchased for the Nationale Konst-Gallery in The Hague in 1800 based on its allegorical reference, but only later did visitors point out that the painter had died long before the murder of the De Witt brothers took place.
