= Gazette d'Amsterdam =

Defunct European newspaper

Gazette d'Amsterdam (also known as Gazette d’Hollande or Nouvelles d'Amsterdam) was one of the most important international European newspapers of the Enlightenment period and a major source of political information. It was a French language bi-weekly newspaper published in Amsterdam from the second half of the 17th century till 1796, during the Batavian Republic.

== Background ==
In the 18th century, the Netherlands (United Provinces) were very tolerant in matters of freedom of the press and religious freedom. Unlike most contemporary countries, such as France, Great Britain or the states of the Holy Roman Empire, there was little government interference in matters of censorship or protected monopolies there. Many Huguenots fled to the Netherlands during the reign of Louis XIV, and the numbers of French refugees increased with the revocation of the Edict of Nantes in 1685. Several of them began publishing newspapers in various European cities covering political news in France and Europe. French was both their native tongue and the lingua franca of European diplomacy. Read by the European elites, these papers were called in France the gazettes étrangères, the "foreign gazettes".

== Contents and history ==
There is some confusion regarding the year that Gazette d'Amsterdam began publishing: sources give dates from 1663, 1668 or 1691; they all agree that the Gazette ceased publication in 1796. The confusion over the year of establishment may be explained by the fact that in the 17th century many readers did not distinguish among different titles of journals published in Amsterdam (and the Netherlands in general), and different titles were often referred to as "d'Amsterdam" (of Amsterdam) or "d'Hollande" (of Holland).

Jean Tronchin Du Breuil (Dubreuil) is commonly seen as the paper's founder and first editor (given the establishment date in 1691). His descendants controlled the newspaper till its demise in the late 18th century.

Like many other contemporary early newspapers, the Gazette printed a juxtaposition of news from various sources, presented in order of geographic point of origin without unifying speech or apparent editorial. Confusingly, for example, in wartime, the terms "our armies" or "enemy" can designate the same subject, depending on who wrote a given piece for the newspaper. Most of the authors were French emigrants. It was relatively expensive, seen as a luxury good, and it is estimated that its circulation was never higher than approximately 1,250. It was also relatively small: usually composed of 6 pages 12x 20 cm, printed in two columns.

It had international range, and was distributed throughout Europe, including France, where it was generally tolerated. It was neither overly supportive nor overly oppositional with regards to the French government, though certainly much more liberal than the official Gazette de France. This was tolerated and even encouraged by the authorities, who often used it for their own ends, when wishing to publicize information that couldn't be released via the official channels. The paper gave voice to institutions that were finding it difficult to publish in the official Gazette de France, like the Parlement of Paris. The independence was not complete; like many others of its period, editors of Gazette d'Amsterdam agreed to be censored, or at least "advised" on many occasions by the French authorities.

It began its decline in the second half of the 18th century, when the French government made it easier for other titles to compete on the French market. As the Gazette was seen as too close to the French government's official position, its readership declined, and it was overtaken by the Gazette de Leyde (Nouvelles Extraordinaires de Divers Endroits), which was seen as much more independent. By 1789, it was no longer seen as a significant European paper.

In its views, in the late 18th century, Gazette d'Amsterdam was opposed to the Dutch Orangists, supporters of the Stadtholder, and with regards to France, leaned towards anti-aristocratic and pro-revolutionary views.
