= Etienne Luzac =

Dutch editor (1706–1787)

- Born: 8 March 1706; Franeker or Amsterdam, Dutch Republic
- Died: 9 January 1787; Leiden, Dutch Republic
- Occupations: Editor, publisher
- Known for: Editor and publisher of Gazette de Leyde
- Relatives: Elie Luzac (nephew), Johan Luzac (nephew), Etienne Luzac Jr (nephew)

Etienne Luzac (8 March 1706 – 9 January 1787) was a Dutch editor and later publisher of the Gazette de Leyde in Leiden.

== Biography ==
Born in Franeker or Amsterdam in 1706, Luzac initially studied theology for several years. However, due to his criticism of the Canons of Dort and resulting opposition, he discontinued his studies. He then assisted his brother, Elie, in managing a boarding school.

In his twenties, Luzac began working as an editor for the Gazette de Leyde. Since 1677, the latest newspaper had been owned by Jean Alexandre de la Font, a Frenchman and Huguenot, who had founded the publishing house. Luzac became the newspaper's most important editor. He maintained regular contact with professors at the University of Leiden. He avoided engaging in religious or political controversies.

In 1738, Luzac purchased the publishing house from de la Font’s daughter. Due to the increasing workload involved in editing and publishing, he enlisted the help of two nephews—Johan Luzac and Etienne Luzac Jr (1754–1809)—in 1772. Luzac remained unmarried and died in 1787. The publishing house of the Gazette de Leyde was succeeded by his nephew Johan.
