= Cornelis Sebille Roos =

Dutch art dealer

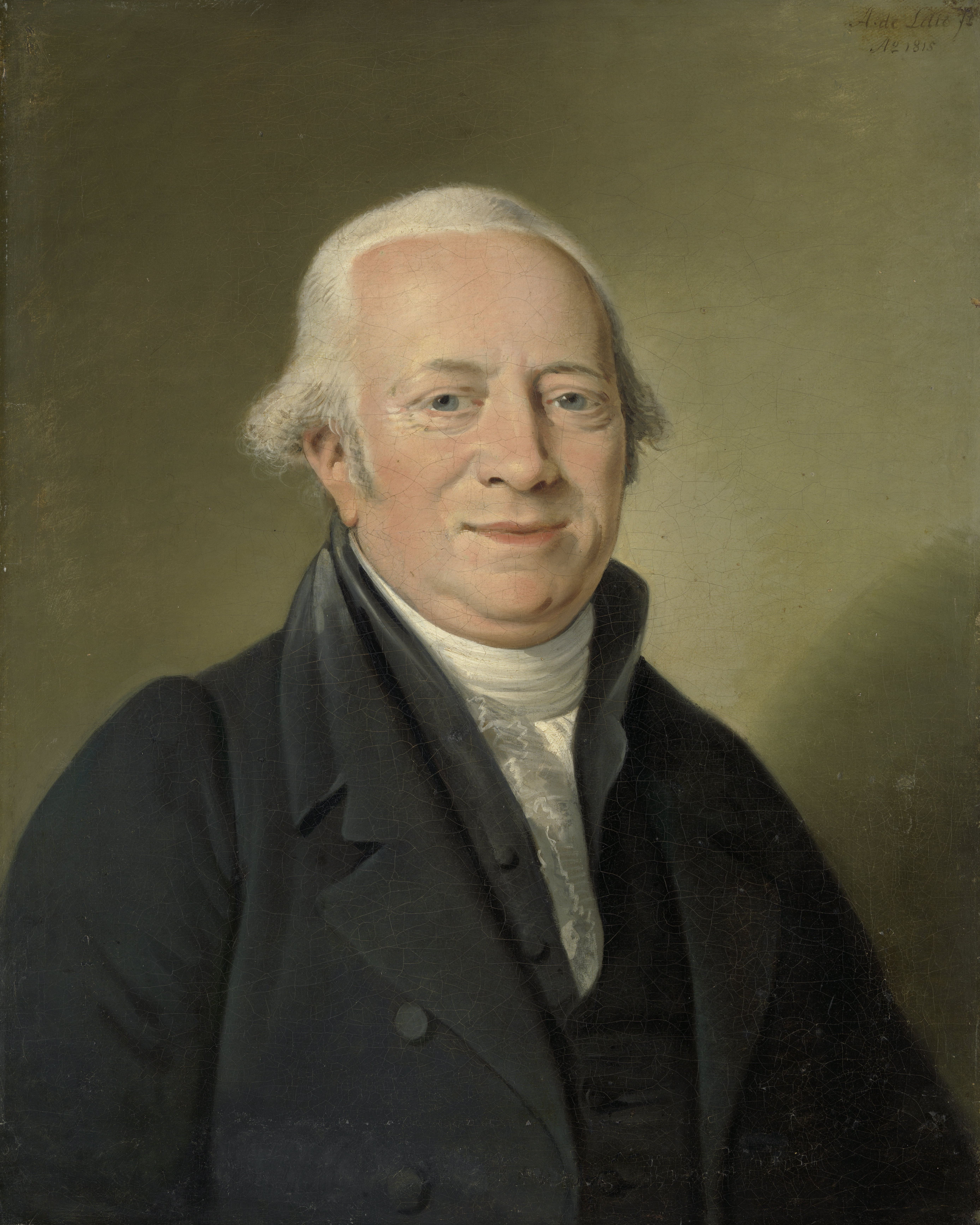
- Portrait by Adriaan de Lelie (1815)
- Born: 10 January 1754; Amsterdam
- Died: 31 January 1820 (aged 66); Amsterdam

Cornelis Sebille Roos or Cornelis Roos (1754 – 1820) was a Dutch art dealer and inspector of the Nationale Konst-Gallery collection in Huis ten Bosch during the years 1799-1801

Roos was born 10 January 1754 in Amsterdam and baptized six days later in the Walloon church. He became a drawing teacher and manager of Felix Meritis, which he helped found. In 1798 he lived in the left-hand side of the Trippenhuis where he started his art dealership. Many of the paintings he originally purchased have found their way into the collection of the Rijksmuseum. He was friends with Jan Gildemeester and attended the estate sale of his art collection, buying many pieces there that later found their way in the Huis ten Bosch collection. The most notable of these was The Threatened Swan by Jan Asselijn, which became the first painting purchased by the director of the Nationale Konst-Gallery, Alexander Gogel. The painting, which is not dated, was painted before the events which caused it to be marked. It was marked to make it a political allegory of the patriot hero Johan de Witt who was murdered by orangists. Since Roos was known for his patriotic politics, it is quite possible that he marked the painting himself when he bought it in 1800, though the estate sale catalog already mentions that it is an allegory of Johan de Witt.

== National art gallery ==
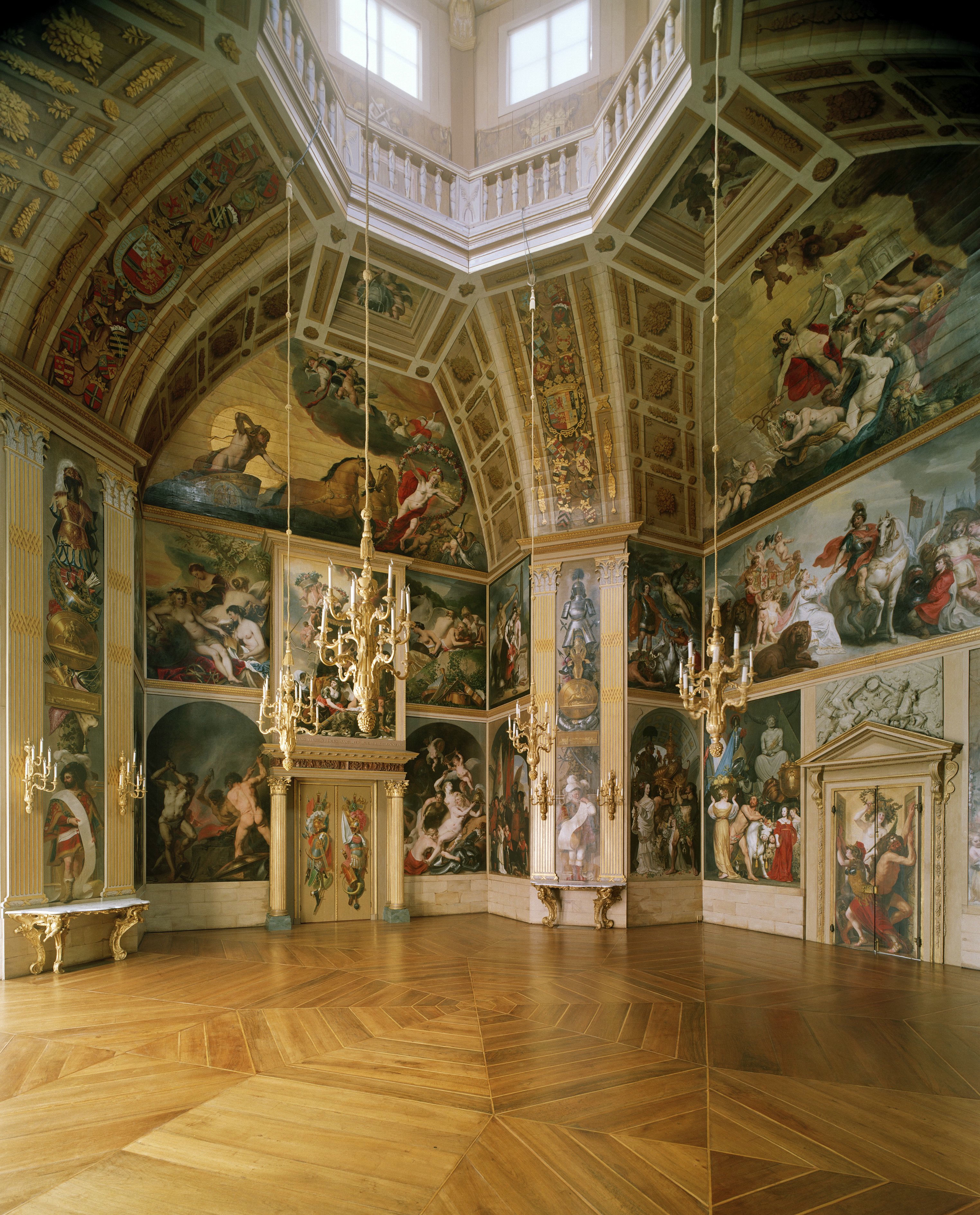
Though one of the main attractions of the young museum in 1800, the Oranjezaal could never be moved and has since remained well-preserved, but closed to the public.

The Nationale Konst-Gallery opened in Huis ten Bosch in 1800 but moved after the government changeover in 1805 to make room for the new inhabitant of Huis ten Bosch, Rutger Jan Schimmelpenninck. The collection was moved to the former Prince William V Gallery, now part of the museum known as the Gevangenpoort. In 1808 it moved again according to the wishes of Lodewijk Napoleon to the former city hall of Amsterdam. Though Roos lived and worked in (Huis met de Hoofden) Amsterdam, the position of inspector in Amsterdam was given to Cornelis Apostool and Roos went back to his dealership. Roos became a member of the Royal Institute, predecessor to the Royal Netherlands Academy of Arts and Sciences, in 1808. In 1815 this Royal Institute was united with Roos' art dealership as they were in both halves of the Trippenhuis. The entire building became the institute with the first floor devoted to the National Konst-Gallery.

Roos died in Amsterdam. He was married twice: in 1784 and 1801. His son Cornelis François Roos continued his art dealership and gallery after his death.

== Art collection ==
Portrait of Johan van Oldenbarnevelt

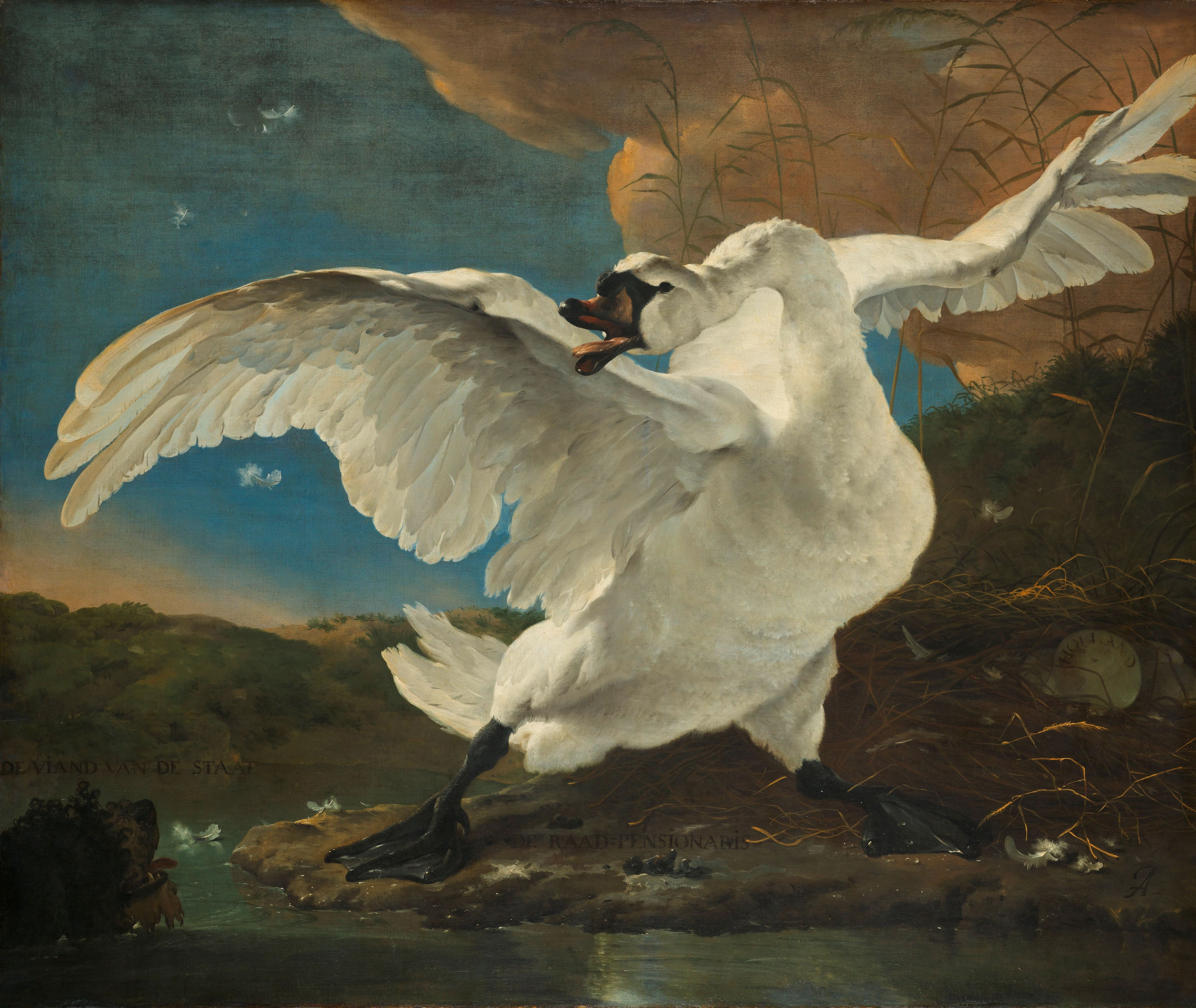
The Threatened Swan

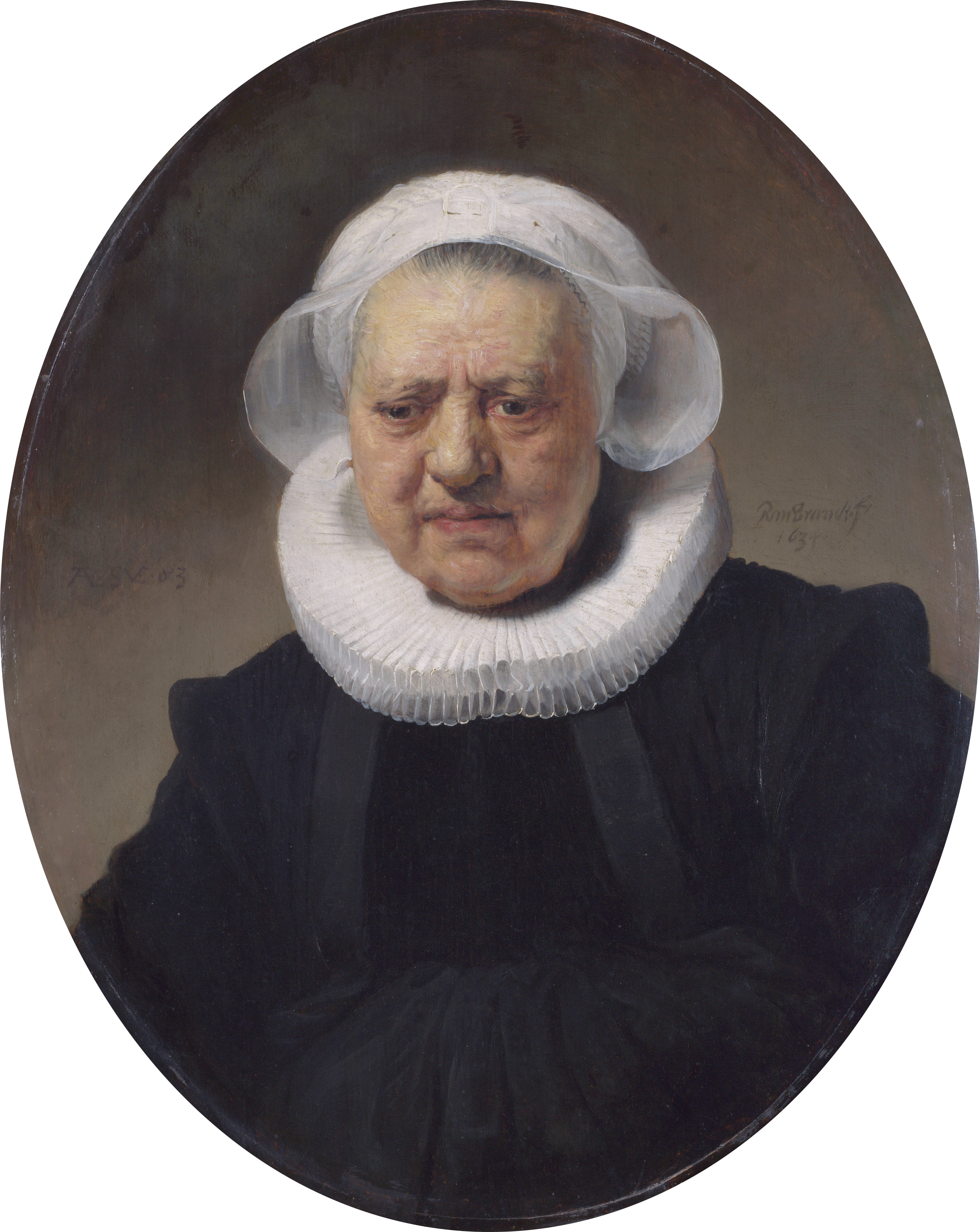
Portrait of Aechje Claesdr. Pesser

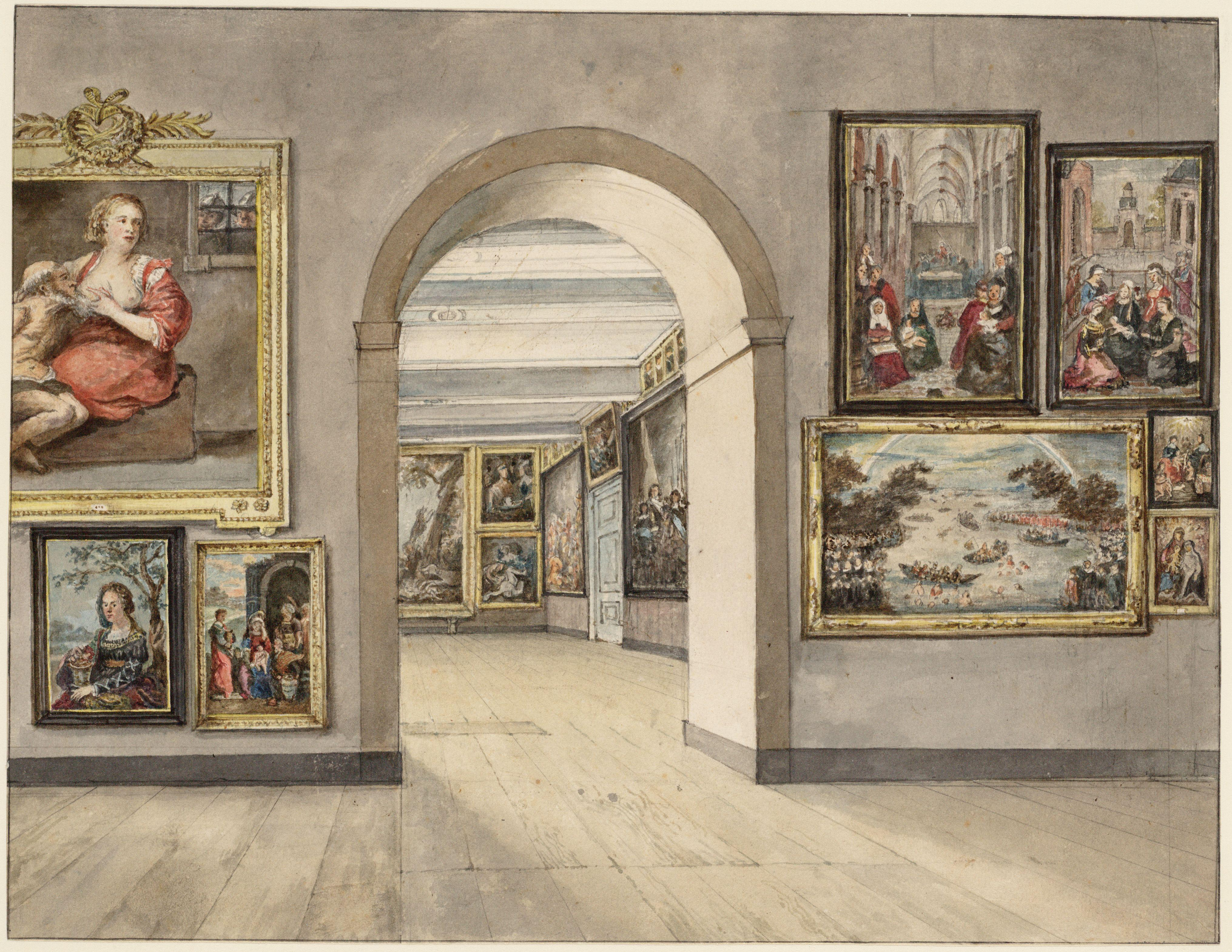
Interior of the Trippenhuis with the national collection, during the period 1825-1885
