= Alexander Gogel =

Dutch politician

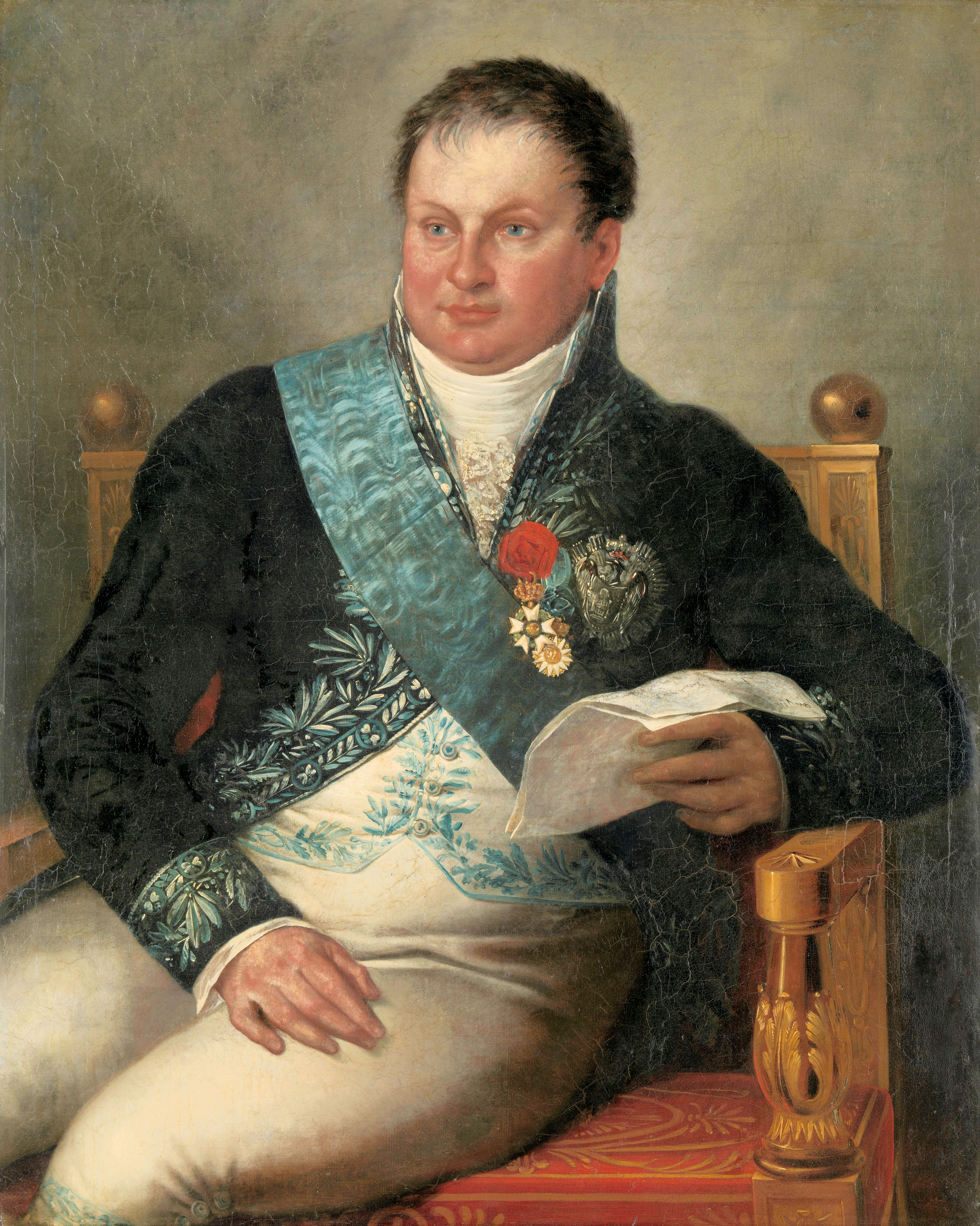
- Portrait of Isaac Jan Gogel by Mattheus Ignatius van Bree, c. 1811

Agent for Finance
- In office 22 January 1798 – 2 October 1801

Member Uitvoerend Bewind
- pro tem
- In office 12 June 1798 – 14 August 1798

Agent for Foreign Affairs
- pro tem
- In office 7 April 1798 – 2 October 1798

Agent for the Interior
- pro tem
- In office 19 June 1801 – 4 July 1801

Secretary of State for Finance
- In office 1 May 1805 – 5 June 1806
- President: Rutger Jan Schimmelpenninck

Minister of Finance
- In office 5 June 1806 – 27 May 1809
- Monarch: Louis Bonaparte

Member, Council for Dutch Affairs in Paris
- In office 22 July 1810 – 29 October 1810

Intendant des Finances et du Trésor Public (administration des Finances des départements des Pays-Bas)
- In office 30 October 1810 – 16 November 1813
- Monarch: Napoleon

Personal details
- Born: Isaäc Jan Alexander Gogel; 10 December 1765 Vught
- Died: June 13, 1821 (aged 55) Overveen
- Resting place: Hillegom
- Parents: Johann Martin Gogel (father); Alexandrina Crul (mother)
- Known for: Nationale Konst-Gallery

Isaac Jan Alexander Gogel (10 December 1765 – 13 June 1821) was a Dutch politician, who was the first minister of finance of the Batavian Republic and the Kingdom of Holland.

== Early years ==
Gogel was born in Vught, the son of Johan Martin Gogel, a German officer in the service of the army of the Dutch Republic, and of Alexandrina Crul. He attended a French boarding school in Tilburg from 1776 to 1781. At the age of 16, he went to Amsterdam to apprentice for a career as a merchant, at the merchant house of Godart Kappel en Zoon. He started his own firm (Gogel, Pluvinot en Gildemeester) in 1791.

== Batavian Revolution ==
Gogel became politically active in 1792 when he joined the Patriot society Doctrina et Amicitia. He was a radical democrat and a unitarist. As part of the revolutionary committee in Amsterdam, he was involved with preparations for the Batavian revolution. Three times he went to the French army in the Southern Netherlands to negotiate for their support. He had to flee to Bremen at the end of October 1794, because the reigning regents in Amsterdam were arresting Patriots.

In January 1795, Gogel returned to Amsterdam after the risk of arrest had decreased. The French were entering the Netherlands to intervene, and Gogel played a major role in the peaceful takeover of the Amsterdam government for the Patriots. He became active in the local Amsterdam politics, advocating for unitarism, while his more radical democratic ideas faded away.

He was elected elector in the 1797 general election, but was not elected representative to the First National Assembly, Which he probably did not want due to his commercial activities. Gogel also declined other regional regional functions in these years. Nevertheless, he involved himself in the political developments and the creation of a constitution. Together with Willem Ockerse, he published the political journal 'De Democraten', where they shared their perspective on the developments.

== Uitvoerend Bewind (1798-1805) ==
After the 22 January 1798, coup d'état by general Herman Willem Daendels, he was appointed agent for finance and foreign affairs (pro tem) under the new Uitvoerend Bewind. However, the contraventions of the new, democratic, constitution of 1798 by the Pieter Vreede regime disaffected him, and he conspired with the other agents and again general Daendels to overthrow that regime in June 1798. He then became a member of the Uitvoerend Bewind himself for a short while, till elections had been held for a new Representative Assembly.

He was again appointed Agent, this time for Finance, by the new Uitvoerend Bewind. He now started on the reform of the Dutch system of public finance that was long overdue. He attempted to reorganize the tax system, but because this entailed abolition of the old, federal arrangements, he met strong resistance. He tried to attain three main objectives with his imposing General Tax Plan: construction of a system of regularly levied taxes, instead of the hodge-podge of ad hoc taxes and forced loans that the Republic had to rely on to make ends meet; a shift away from regressive, indirect taxes toward direct income taxes; and an equalization of the tax burden between different parts of the country. Besides, he proposed to form a new, national organisation to collect the taxes. His General-Taxation-Plan legislation was first proposed in 1799, but only enacted on 15 March 1801.

=== Nationale Konst-Gallery ===
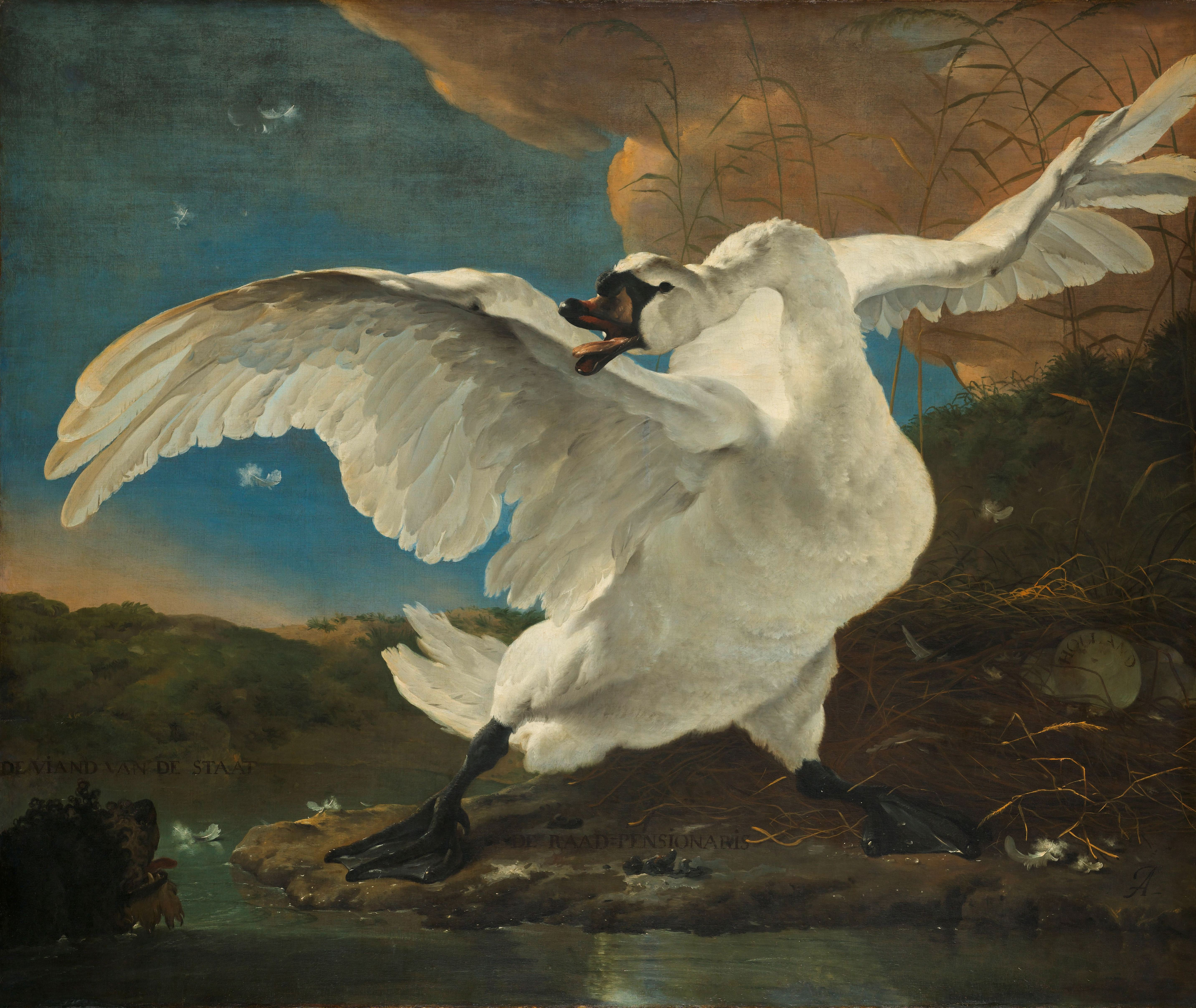
The Threatened Swan, the first of many works that Roos purchased and resold to Gogel

Modelled after the Louvre, Gogel envisioned a National art gallery for art-lovers and artists alike, that would promote the country's art heritage and educate its citizens. Starting in 1798, he started to create the Nationale Konst-Gallery (now Rijksmuseum). His motivation was partially developed out of the worries shared by many art lovers in the Netherlands at that time that the French saviors of freedom would take more than just one collection with them to Paris, as in 1795 the entire contents of Willem V's gallery had been installed in the Louvre. He decided on a place and two major types of art, and these were the Huis ten Bosch location with its magnificent Oranjezaal and the concepts "historieele" and "moderne" art.

Gogel saw that under the new government, he was able to appropriate pieces from distributed Royal collections (such as the Oranjezaal itself) and felt that if he did this in a systematic way with the intention to found a national collection, he would thus "save" the art from the French "saviors". For his national inventory in 1799 he appointed an inspector for this job: Cornelis Sebille Roos. As a patriot, Gogel was mostly interested in what he saw as "patriotic" art that promoted the country and taught a moral lesson, which indicates that probably it was Roos who put the moralistic text on The Threatened Swan" in order to sell the painting to Gogel.

== Grand Pensionary Schimmelpenninck (1805-1806) ==
By 1805 the political winds had changed again. The unitarian Constitution of 1798, on whose tenets the plan was based, was being undermined by the Uitvoerend Bewind itself. The new Constitution of 1801, that came into force after another coup in the Fall of that year, entailed a re-federalization of the state. Gogel courageously fulminated against the financial chapters of that Constitution before the referendum that was set up to approve it. Soon afterward he lost his job, because the central Agencies were abolished, together with the Uitvoerend Bewind. In May 1802, another of his reform plans, the founding of a National Bank, was discarded by the new regime (to be revived only in 1814).

Gogel now became a private citizen again, forming a new commercial firm Gogel en d'Arripe. During his years in the wilderness he remained in touch with politics, however. In the Spring of 1804 he approached the then commander-in-chief of the French army of occupation Auguste de Marmont, a confidant of Napoleon's, with information critical of the Staatsbewind of the Batavian Republic, and a project for a new constitution. At the same time, Marmont happened to be fishing around for information of other discontented Dutch politicians, on the orders of Napoleon. Soon a coalition was formed around the Batavian envoy to Paris, Rutger Jan Schimmelpenninck that openly worked to drive out the Staatsbewind. Gogel played an important role in this coalition, even though he (as a convinced unitarist) and Schimmelpenninck (as the leader of the federalists) did not see eye to eye on many things. However, Napoleon made clear that he preferred the unitarist vision of Gogel, and his opinion of course prevailed, when the Staatsbewind was replaced by the regime of Grand Pensionary Schimmelpenninck in May 1805.

Gogel now was appointed Secretary of State for Finance. Now he was able to push through his old General Taxation Plan, in slightly modified form. This was made easier by the fact that under the new constitution of 1805 the often-obstructionist Legislative Body had been made toothless. Though Gogel was a lifelong democrat, never making concessions on his belief that the franchise should be universal (unlike other Patriot politicians, who in the course of events changed their views in a more authoritarian direction), as a technocrat he saw the advantage of being able to make his views prevail. His tax reforms were enacted in June, 1805, and put into operation on 11 January 1802.

However, the final days of the Batavian Republic were passing rapidly. Gogel was a member of the Groot Besogne (Grand Commission) that helped to negotiate the transition to the Kingdom of Holland under king Louis Napoleon, however reluctantly.

== Kingdom of Holland (1806-1810) ==
In 1806 this title was changed to Minister under the new kingdom. As such he had to deal with attempts of the old elites to water down his new system of taxation that had been implemented only a few months before over much opposition. However, at first he gained the support of the new king, who had been impressed by his warnings about the dire state of the Dutch economy at the time. Revenues under the new system were falling short of expectations, and the kingdom therefore had to rely even more than before on deficit financing. The credit of the Dutch state had now suffered so much, that it was no longer possible to float bond loans without the assistance of the Amsterdam merchant bankers that had previously only served foreign governments, like that of the United States, as intermediaries. Fortunately, the Dutch system for financing sovereign debt, foreign or domestic, was still unparalleled at the time. A few years later, however, the first benefits of the new system (enhanced revenues, reduced administrative costs, formation of a national fiscal bureaucracy) had finally been realized.

Some of those reforms were of lasting importance. As the verponding (land tax) was an important new element of the system a kadaster had to be implemented. This had important beneficial effects in the sphere of Dutch civil law, also. Other persisting reforms: in 1807 he was able to enact a law to reform the Dutch coinage. He also was instrumental in the abolition of the guilds and other economic reforms, like the abolition of internal tariffs and other obstructions to trade. He was the first director of the predecessor of the Royal Netherlands Academy of Arts and Sciences under the Kingdom of Holland.

Like king Louis, Gogel had a difficult character. This led increasingly to personal conflicts. He resigned in 1809 because of a conflict with the king over a commission for further tax reform.

== French Empire (1810-1813) ==
After the annexation of the Netherlands in 1810, Gogel took up the duties of finance minister again, but now as intendant des finances in the part of the imperial government that was devoted to the Dutch departments of the French Empire. He did this in the illusion that he might be able to shield his compatriots from the worst excesses of the imperial administration. Legion were his attempts to persuade the government in Paris that certain allowances had to be made for special Dutch circumstances. But, these proved mostly in vain. When the French lost their grip on the Netherlands in 1813, after the accession of William I of the Netherlands, Gogel fled to France without his family. to wait for the events to unfold.

== Kingdom of the Netherlands (1813-1821) ==
He returned to the Kingdom of the Netherlands in May 1814, but he refused to take office under the new regime, which he viewed as a restoration of the pre-1795 Orangist clique that he despised (though he relented shortly before his death to become a member of the new Raad van State). He returned to private life, and started a small factory. He died soon after in 1821 in Overveen.

== Personal life ==
He married Catharina van Hasselt in 1800, and had one son and two daughters.

== Titles and decorations ==
- Grootkruis Orde van de Unie, 17 February 1807
- Grootkruis Orde van de Reünie, 22 February 1812
- Commandeur in de Orde van de Nederlandse Leeuw
- Commandeur de la Légion d'honneur, 30 June 1811
- Chévalier de l'Empire, 1811

== Publications ==
- "Over de nadeelen der buitenlandsche geldlichtingen", in: De Democraten, Aug. 17, 1796.
- "Memoriën en correspondentiën betrekkelijk den staat van 's rijk's geldmiddelen in den jaren 1820" (posthumously; edited by his son, J.M. Gogel, 1844)

== Sources ==
- Geyl, P. (1971). La Révolution batave, 1783–1798 (in French). Paris: Société des études robespierristes.
- Postma, J. (2017). Alexander Gogel (1765–1821). Grondlegger van de Nederlandse staat (in Dutch). Hilversum: Uitgeverij Verloren. ISBN 978-90-8704-633-0.
- Schama, S. (1977). Patriots and Liberators. Revolution in the Netherlands 1780–1813. New York: Vintage books. ISBN 0-679-72949-6.

Political offices
Vacant Title last held by Hieronymus van Alphen as Treasurer-General	Agent for Finance; 1798–1801	Succeeded by Andries Sybrand Abbema
Preceded by Jan Arend de Vos van Steenwijk as Treasurer-General	Secretary of State for Finance; 1805–1806	Succeeded by Himself as Minister of Finance
Preceded by Himself as Secretary of State for Finance	Minister of Finance; 1806–1809	Succeeded by Jean Henry Appelius
