= The Threatened Swan =

Painting by Jan Asselijn

- De bedreigde zwaan (Dutch)
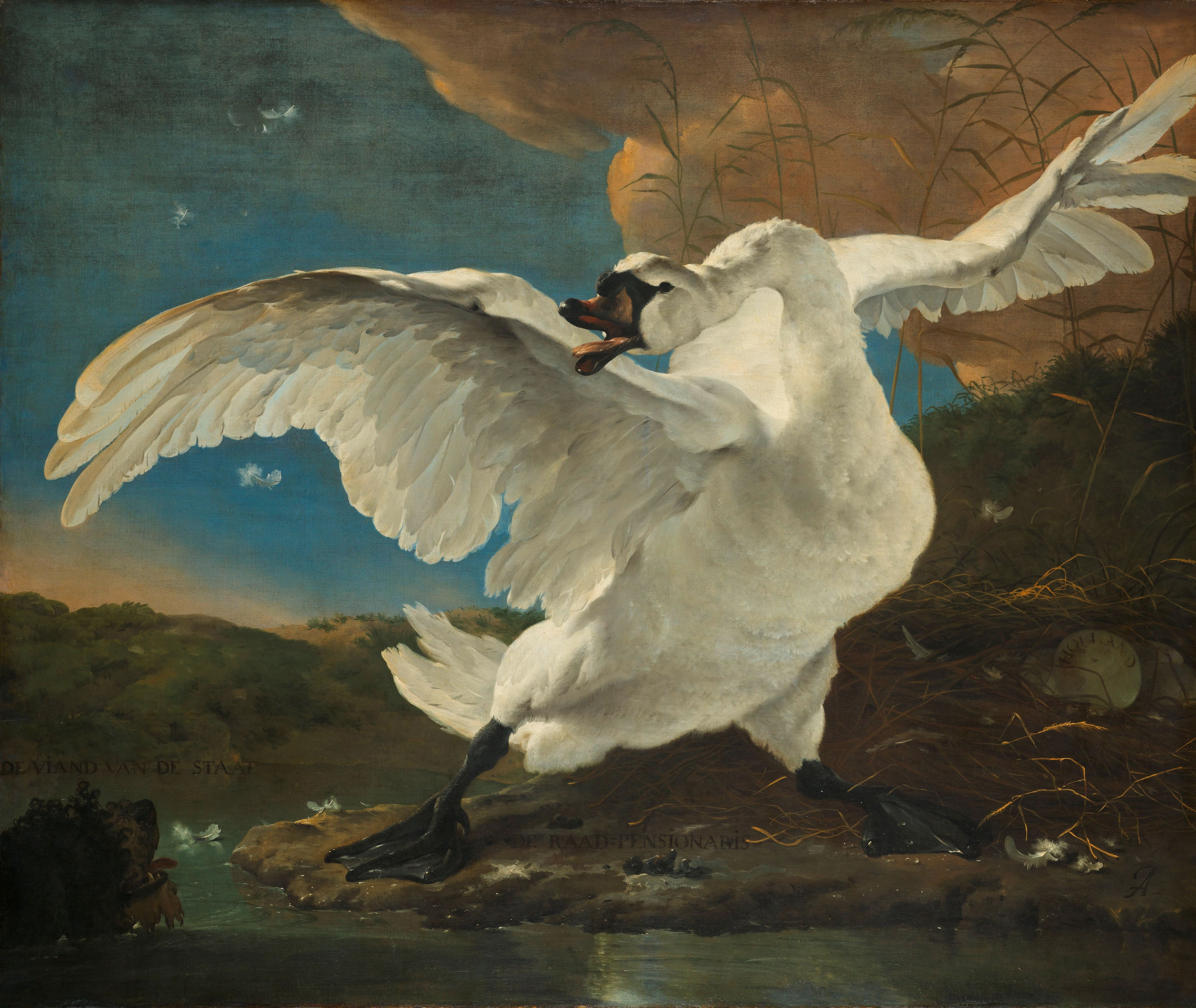
- Artist: Jan Asselijn
- Year: c. 1650
- Medium: Oil on canvas
- Dimensions: 144 cm × 171 cm (57 in × 67 in)
- Location: Rijksmuseum, Amsterdam, Netherlands

The Threatened Swan (Dutch: De bedreigde zwaan) is an oil painting of a mute swan made around 1650 by Dutch Golden Age painter Jan Asselijn. The work is in the collection of the Rijksmuseum in Amsterdam in the Netherlands.

It is 144 centimetres (57 in) high and 171 centimetres (67 in) wide. The painting's subject is a life-size swan (Cygnus olor) defending its nest against a dog. At the bottom right, the painting is signed with the monogram "A".

By 1800 when it was purchased, the painting was interpreted as a political allegory of grand pensionary (the highest official in Holland, the main province of the Dutch Republic) Johan de Witt protecting the country from its enemies. Three inscriptions had been added: the words "de raad-pensionaris" (the grand pensionary) between the swan's legs, the words "de viand van de staat" (the enemy of the state) above the head of the dog on the left, and the name "Holland" on the egg on the right.

In the 1790s this painting was in the collection of Jan Gildemeester and was included in the 1800 catalog of paintings (ordered alphabetically by artist) produced for his estate sale, though it was not included in Adriaan de Lelie's 1794 painting of the collection known as The Art Gallery of Jan Gildemeester Jansz. The catalog states that it is an "allegory of Raadpensionaris de Witt". The painting was purchased by the art dealer Cornelis Sebille Roos for 100 guilders for the Nationale Konst-Gallery in The Hague, on behalf of the director Alexander Gogel. It is documented as the first purchase by that institution.

It was selected as one of the paintings of national importance that needed to be saved from export to the Louvre. Along with the rest of this 'national history' collection, it was therefore shown in Huis ten Bosch from 1800-1805, Prince William V Gallery from 1805-1808, Royal Palace of Amsterdam from 1808-1817, Trippenhuis from 1817-1885, and Rijksmuseum from 1885 onwards.

Current speculation is that the white text was added to the painting in the 1750s during Witten-Oorlog, a pamphlet war between historians. Its painter Jan Asselijn was assumed to have written the words himself until the timeline was brought into question. The Witten-Oorlog, also known as "Witts War" revolved around the 1672 execution of the De Witt brothers, who were Dutch politicians. Jan Asselijn died in 1652.
