= Courier du Bas-Rhin =

18th century newspaper

Courier du Bas-Rhin (or Courrier du Bas Rhin, lit. Courier of Lower Rhine) was one of the leading European papers of the late 18th century and the Enlightenment period. It was published in French language in Kleve (Cleves) (then a Prussian exclave east of the Dutch Republic from 1767.

== Background ==
In the 18th century, the Netherlands (United Provinces) were very tolerant in matters of freedom of the press and religious freedom. Unlike most contemporary countries, such as France, Great Britain or the Holy Roman Empire, there was little government interference (censorship or monopolies) there. Many Huguenots were exiled to the Netherlands during the reign of Louis XIV, and the numbers of French refugees increased with the revocation of the Edict of Nantes in 1685. Several exiles begun publishing French-language (as it was both an international language and their own - see lingua franca) newspapers in various European cities covering political news in France and Europe. Read by the European elites, in France these papers were called "Foreign gazettes".

== Contents and history ==
The Courier had a circulation of 1430 in 1793 and 530 in 1801.

It was heavily influenced by the Prussian authorities, and seen by some as a Prussian propaganda outlet. It was, nonetheless, much freer when it came to reporting events outside Prussia, for example, in France. It lost most of its remaining independence around 1806–1807, when the authorities took control of most German newspapers.

Courier du Bas Rhin supported enlightened absolutism; supported British liberties - but doubted they were fully respected; supported the Dutch Stadholder, and was sympathetic to the French Revolution (although mostly, post-revolution). It was often in major opposition to another leading journal of its time, Gazette de Leyde (the papers were, for example, on opposite sides concerning the Dutch Revolution).

Sources vary on when the Courier stopped publication. Barker and Burrows suggest 1807, while Beermann indicates 1810. Alexander notes that a publication with similar name was published in the first half of the 19th century. Another similarly named publication (Courrier du département du Bas-Rhin, also known as Niederrheinischer Kurier) was also published in Alsace in the second half of the 19th century.

== Editors ==
- Jean Manzon (Manson), founder, editor from 1768 to 1798

Post-1810:

- Frederic-Rodolph Saltzmann
- Jean-Henri Silbermann
