= Emilie Luzac =

Dutch letter writer

Marguérite Emilie Luzac (Leiden, 30 November 1748 – Watten, near Dunkirk, 28 November 1788) was a Dutch letter writer.

She was the sister of Jean (Johan) Luzac, book seller and publisher, her parents were Jean (Jan) Luzac (1702–1783) and Anna Hillegonda Valckenaer (relation of Johan Valckenaer). On 5 November 1775 she married Wybo Fijnje, and the couple had three children: Jantje (Jean Etienne Fine), who died on 30 March 1866; Miete-Coosje Fine; and Gontje (who died almost immediately after his birth). They lived in Delft, but also owned the country estate of Vlietenburgh in Voorburg. Since Wybo Fijnje was a member of the Patriots and the publisher of Hollandsche Historische Courant in Delft, after the Orange Revolution of 1787 the couple had to flee, leaving firstly for Antwerp, then Brussels, and finally Watten in French Flanders, where Emilie died in 1788. Her letters (and a few by Wybo Fijnje) are published, with an ample introduction, by Baartmans under the title Myne beslommerde Boedel (2003).
