= Edict of Fontainebleau =

1685 French decree

- Territorial extent: France
- Signed by: Louis XIV
- Signed: 18 October 1685
- Effective: 22 October 1685 (Paris)

Repeals
- Edict of Nantes

Keywords
- Freedom of religion in France

Text of statute as originally enacted

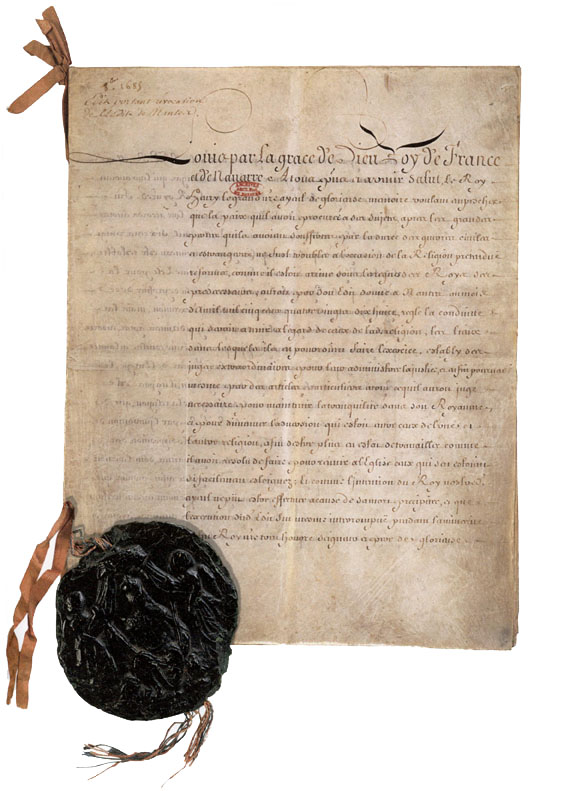
First page of the Edict of Fontainebleau (Archives nationales de France)

The Edict of Fontainebleau (18 October 1685, published 22 October 1685), also known as the Revocation of the Edict of Nantes, was an edict issued by King Louis XIV of France, repealing the rights and freedoms afforded to the Huguenots and all non-catholic religions. The Edict of Nantes (1598) had granted Huguenots (French Calvinist Protestants) the right to practice their religion without state persecution. Protestants had lost their independence in places of refuge under Cardinal Richelieu on account of their supposed insubordination, but they continued to live in comparative security and political ease prior to the edict. From the outset, religious tolerance in France had been a royal, rather than popular, policy.

But the lack of universal adherence to Roman Catholicism was incompatible with Louis XIV's vision of a perfect autocracy. Through successive efforts, the Huguenots were left disenfranchised of their religious institutions and political rights.

== Edict of Nantes ==
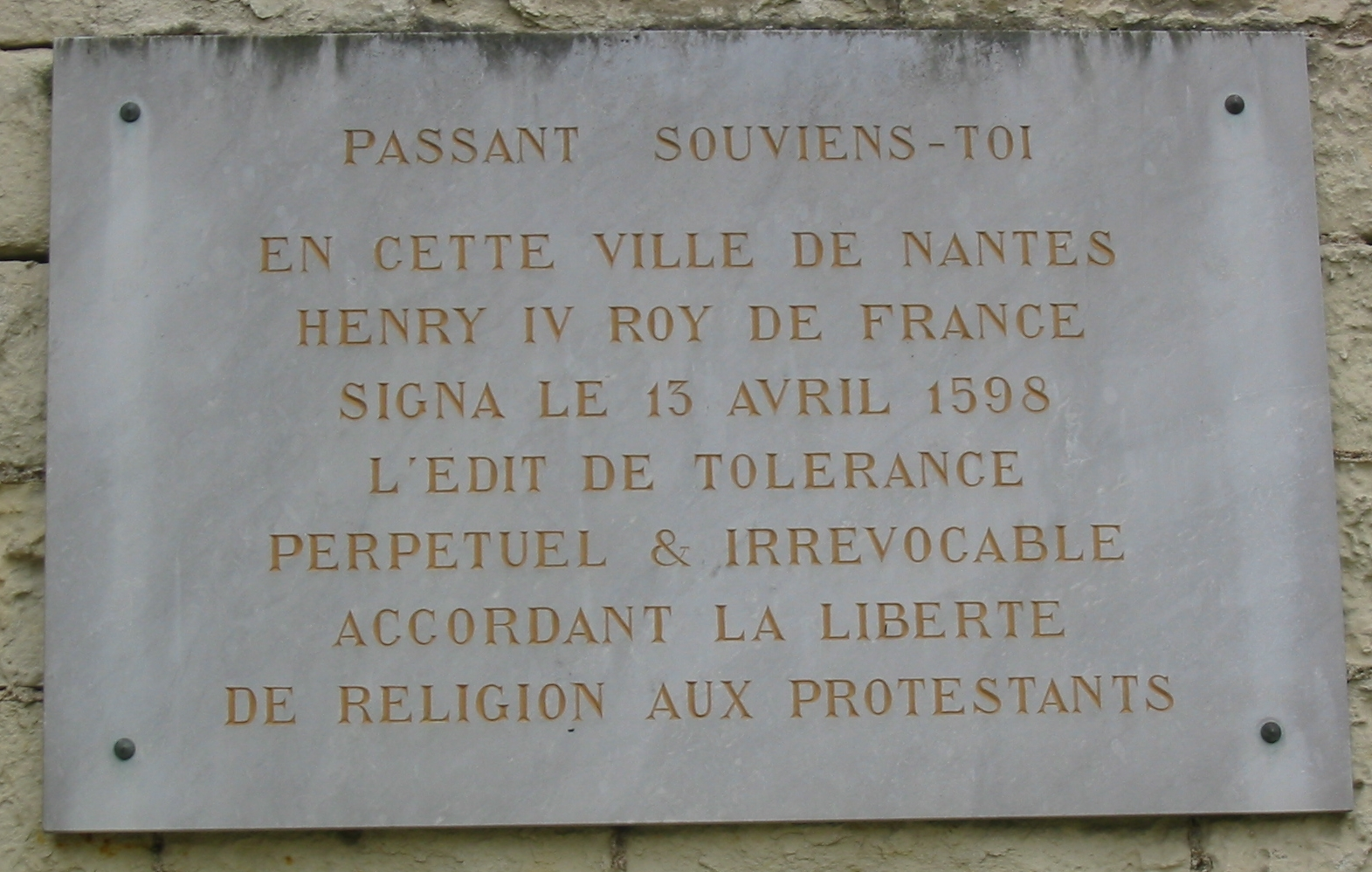
Plaque commemorating Edict of Nantes

The Edict of Nantes had been issued on 13 April 1598 by Henry IV of France and granted the Calvinist Protestants of France, also known as Huguenots, substantial rights in the predominantly-Catholic state. Henry aimed at promoting civil unity by the edict. The edict offered general freedom of conscience to individuals and many specific concessions to the Protestants, such as amnesty and the reinstatement of their civil rights, including the rights to work in any field, including for the state, and to bring grievances directly to the king. It marked the end of the French Wars of Religion, which had afflicted France during the second half of the 16th century.

== Revocation ==
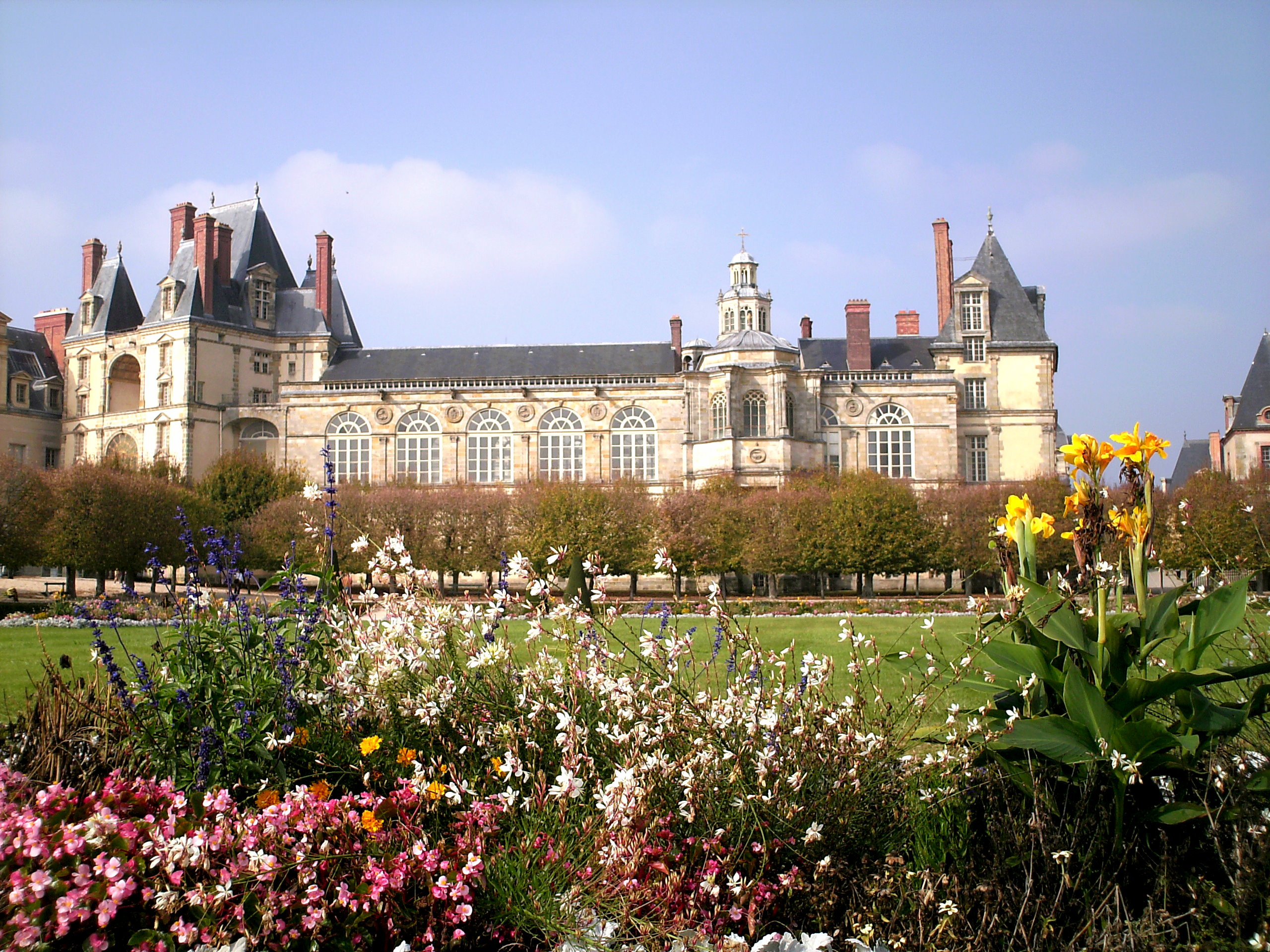
The Palace of Fontainebleau as it now stands

In his edict given at his Palace of Fontainebleau in October 1685, Louis XIV revoked the Edict of Nantes and ordered the destruction of Huguenot churches as well as the closing of Protestant schools. All members of the Reformed Church in France who were abroad were to have their possessions confiscated if they did not return within a period of four months from the decree. All pastors who did not convert would be subject to the pain of the galleys. Any "recently converted" individuals found to be secretly practicing Protestantism would likewise face a similar punishment. The edict made official the policy of persecution that was already enforced since the dragonnades that he had created in 1681 to intimidate Huguenots into converting to Catholicism, renewing efforts to forcibly convert those north of the Loire valley. The edict was particularly unique in its official ban on emigration, proving itself to be distinctly repressive even by European standards.

As a result of the officially sanctioned persecution by the dragoons, who were billeted upon prominent Huguenots, many Protestants, estimates ranging from 210,000 to 900,000, left France over the next two decades. They sought asylum in the United Provinces, Sweden, Switzerland, Brandenburg-Prussia, Denmark, Scotland, England, Protestant states of the Holy Roman Empire, the Cape Colony in Africa and North America. On 17 January 1686, Louis XIV claimed that out of a Huguenot population of 800,000 to 900,000, only 1,000 to 1,500 had remained in France.

It was believed that Louis XIV's pious second wife, Madame de Maintenon, was a strong advocate for the persecution of the Protestants. She was thought to have urged Louis to revoke Henry IV's edict; however, there is no formal proof of this, and such views have now been challenged. Madame de Maintenon was by birth a Catholic but was also the granddaughter of Agrippa d'Aubigné, a stalwart Calvinist. Protestants tried to turn Madame de Maintenon and any time she took the defence of Protestants, she was suspected of relapsing into her family faith. Thus, her position was thin, which wrongly led people to believe that she advocated persecution.

The revocation of the Edict of Nantes aligned France with virtually every other European country of the period (with the exception of the Principality of Transylvania and the Polish–Lithuanian Commonwealth), which legally tolerated only the majority state religion.

== Effects ==
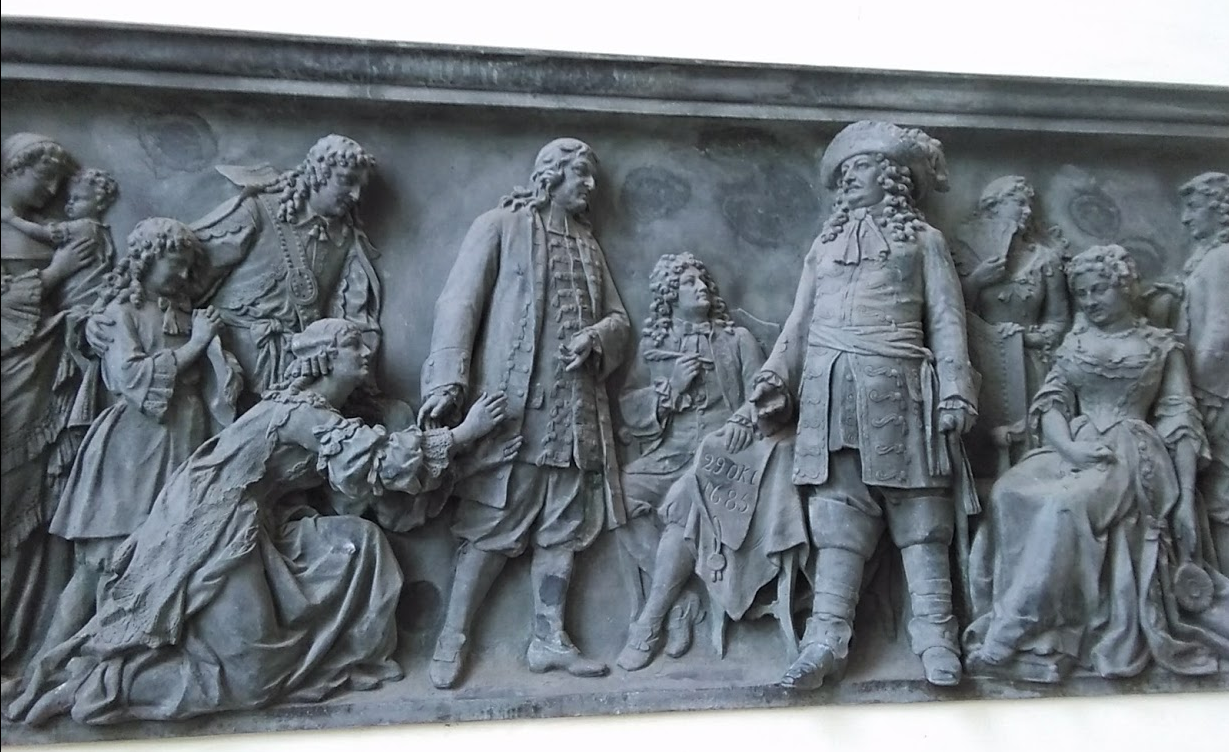
French Huguenots fleeing to Brandenburg

The Edict of Fontainebleau is compared by many historians with the 1492 Alhambra Decree ordering the Expulsion of the Jews from Spain and the Expulsion of the Moriscos of 1609 to 1614. All three are comparable insofar as they are legal manifestations of religious prejudice ending periods of relative tolerance, producing similarly undesirable social and economic effects. In practice, the revocation caused France to suffer a brain drain, as it lost many skilled craftsmen, including key designers such as Daniel Marot. Upon leaving France, Huguenots took with them knowledge of important techniques and styles, which had a significant effect on the quality of the silk, plate glass, silversmithing, watchmaking and cabinet making industries of those regions to which they relocated. Some rulers, such as Frederick Wilhelm, Duke of Prussia and Elector of Brandenburg, who issued the Edict of Potsdam in late October 1685, encouraged the Protestants to seek refuge in their nations. Similarly, in 1720 Frederick IV of Denmark invited the French Huguenots to seek refuge in Denmark, which they accepted, settling in Fredericia and other locations.

== Abolition ==
In practice, the implacable policies outlawing Protestants were opposed by the Jansenists, and were relaxed during the reign of Louis XV, particularly among discreet members of the upper classes. "The fact that a hundred years later, when Protestants were again tolerated, many of them were found to be both commercially prosperous and politically loyal indicates that they fared far better than the Catholic Irish", Robert Roswell Palmer concluded.

By the late 18th century, numerous prominent French philosophers and literary men of the day, including Anne-Robert-Jacques Turgot, were arguing strongly for religious tolerance. Efforts by Guillaume-Chrétien de Malesherbes, minister to Louis XVI and Jean-Paul Rabaut Saint-Étienne, a spokesman for the Protestant community, together with members of a provincial appellate court or parlement of the Ancien Régime, were particularly effective in persuading the king to open French society despite concerns expressed by some of his advisors. Thus, on 7 November 1787, Louis XVI signed the Edict of Versailles, known as the edict of tolerance, registered in the parlement 2 1/2 months later, on 29 January 1788. The edict offered forbearance to the main alternative faiths to the Calvinist, Lutheran and Jewish faiths by giving their followers civil and legal recognition as well as the right to form congregations openly after 102 years of prohibition.

Substantial religious freedoms were achieved two years later, with the enactment of the Declaration of the Rights of Man and of the Citizen. While a controversial legislative document for its age, the 1787 edict was nonetheless a pivotal step in eliminating religious strife, and it officially ended religious persecution in France. Moreover, when French revolutionary armies invaded other European countries between 1789 and 1815, they followed a consistent policy of emancipating persecuted or circumscribed religious communities (Roman Catholic in some countries, Protestant in others and Jewish in most).

== Apology ==
In October 1985, on the tricentenary of the Edict of Fontainebleau, French President François Mitterrand issued a public apology to the descendants of Huguenots around the world.

== Famous Huguenots who left France ==
- Jean Barbot
- Jean Chardin
- de la Font
- Jean Luzac (see also Nouvelles Extraordinaires de Divers Endroits)
- Daniel Marot
- Abraham de Moivre
- Denis Papin
- Duke of Schomberg

== See also ==
- War of the Camisards
- French Wars of Religion
- Religions in France
- Edict of Potsdam
- 1731 expulsion of Protestants from Salzburg
- Savoyard–Waldensian wars
- Brain drain
- End of the persecution of Huguenots and restoration of French citizenship
- Right of return to France
