= Nouvelles Extraordinaires de Divers Endroits =

International European newspaper in the 17th and 18th century

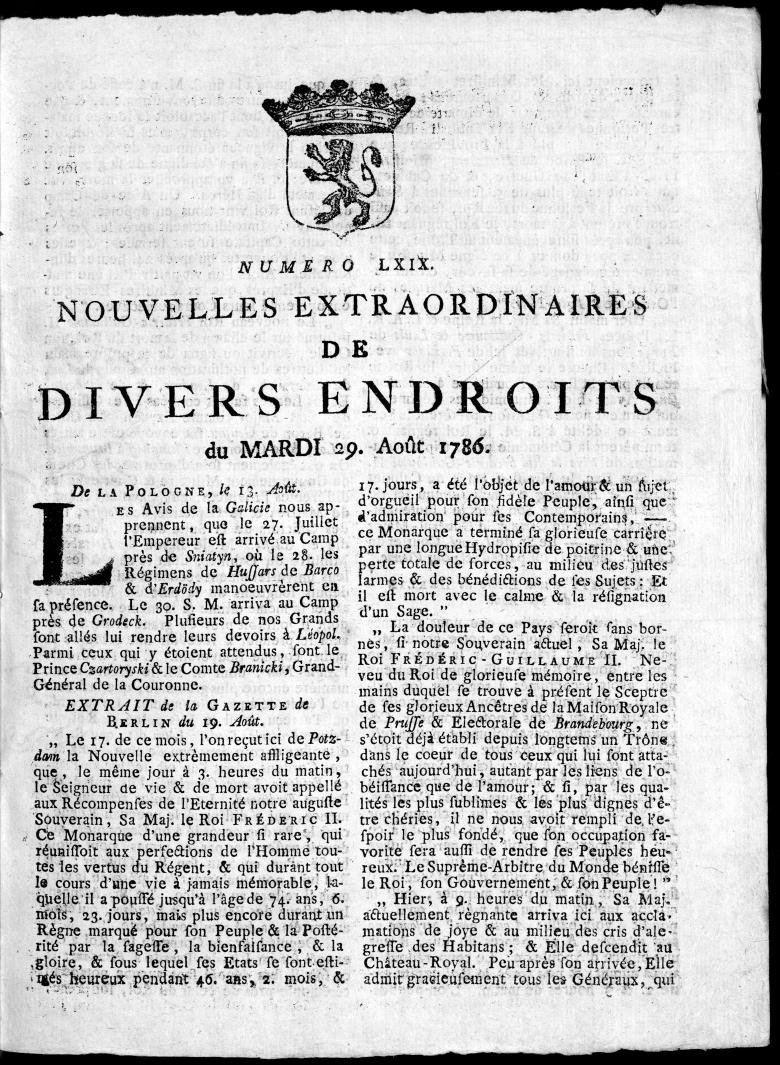
Front cover (first page) of the Gazette de Leyde from 29 August 1786

Nouvelles Extraordinaires de Divers Endroits (English: "Extraordinary News from Various Places") or Gazette de Leyde (Gazette of Leiden) was the most important newspaper of record of the international European newspapers of the late 17th to the late 18th century. In the last few decades of the 18th century it was one of the main political newspapers in the Western world.

It was published in French in Leiden, Netherlands. At that time the Netherlands enjoyed a significant freedom of the press. Its circulation likely exceeded 10,000, and it may have reached even up to 100,000.

== Background ==
The Netherlands (United Provinces) were, in the 18th century, very tolerant in matters of freedom of the press and religious freedom. Compared to most contemporary countries, such as France, Great Britain or the Holy Roman Empire, there was little government interference (censorship or monopolies). Many Huguenots fled France for the Netherlands during the reign of Louis XIV, particularly after the revocation of the Edict of Nantes in 1685. Several of them began publishing French-language newspapers (French being both their language and internationally used - see lingua franca) in a number of European cities covering political news in France and Europe. Read by the European elite, these papers were known in France as the "foreign gazettes" (fr. gazettes étrangères).

== Contents and history ==
The paper was founded by a Huguenot family, the de la Fonts, and passed into the hands of another Huguenot family, the Luzacs, in 1738. Sources vary on the exact date it was founded, suggesting 1660, 1667 1669 or 1680; they all agree the publication continued to 1798 (or 1811 under a different name).

It was published twice a week (on Tuesdays and Thursdays) in Leiden (hence its popular unofficial name, Gazette de Leyde). The newspaper usually contained eight pages arranged as a four-page booklet. The size varied; surviving examples are generally 11.6 centimetres (4.6 in) by 19.4 centimetres (7.6 in) or 12.3 centimetres (4.8 in) by 19.8 centimetres (7.8 in), in which the text is organized into two columns. A four-page, single column supplement was published from 1753. The paper quality varied, war time conditions often enforced use of low quality stock, and the print was small and cramped. Subscriptions from France amounted to over 2,500 by 1778, at an annual cost of 36 livres.

Despite being a French-language publication, the gazette was seen as independent of France. Its production was tolerated and even encouraged by the authorities, who often used Gazette de Leyde and other similar publications for their own ends, when wishing to publicize information that could not be released via the official channels. The paper also gave voice to institutions like the Parliament of France that were finding it difficult to publish in the official French newspaper, the Gazette de France.

Nouvelles Extraordinaires, like other newspapers of its time, gave primarily political and commercial information, classified by source and date of arrival (the oldest, from the most distant lands, coming first). It offered reports on international politics, such as wars and diplomatic relations, as well as coverage of major domestic affairs. The newspaper also contained trivia, editorials and advertising. Like many other early newspapers, it offered judgments and prognostications, and was in the main a juxtaposition of rumors and announcements from various sources, presented without much unification.

It is distinguished by its position against the French absolute monarchy, support for religious tolerance, including for Jansenism, support for democratic reforms such as the introduction of parliaments, support for the American independence and the Polish Constitution of May 3, 1791. The newspaper preferred to praise the changes in Poland (the Polish–Lithuanian Commonwealth) more than those in France, criticizing the violence of the French Revolution, and contrasting it with the peaceful transformation in Poland. This relative lack of support for the French Revolution may explain why the paper was abolished on 23 April 1798, three years after the invasion of the Netherlands by France and the Batavian Revolution. It reappeared as the Nouvelles politiques publiées à Leyde in October, but it was seen as no longer independent. Under a new name—Journal politique publié à Leyde—it lasted from 1804 until 1811, but it never regained its audience and its quality, and disappeared after the annexation of Holland by the French Empire. A new Leyden Gazette briefly appeared after the liberation of Holland in 1814.

== Impact ==
Its circulation reached several thousand, with the highest estimates of about 10,000 issues, and copies of it were found from Moscow and Istanbul to Madrid and the United States. With unlicensed copies and shared subscriptions its circulation might have even been several times higher, reaching at the highest estimates close to 100,000.

Nouvelles Extraordinaires was the most popular of about 20 French-language newspapers published mainly outside France, most in the Netherlands and Germany (in terms of popularity, it was followed by Gazette d'Amsterdam and later, Courier du Bas-Rhin). Thomas Jefferson referred to it as "the best in Europe" and "the only one worth reading" and it was said to be the only journal read by Louis XVI. The paper's impact and recognition on the 18th century has been compared to that of the London Times in the 19th century, and the New York Times in the 20th, and Twitter in the 21st century.

== Editors ==
The newspaper editors were:

- Jean Alexandre de la Font (1677–1685)
- Claude Jordan (1685 ?-1688?)
- Anthony de la Font (1689–1738)
- Etienne Luzac (1738–1772)
- Jean Luzac (1772–1798)

== See also ==
- Gazette
- University of Leyden
