= Jan Asselijn =

Dutch painter (c. 1610 – c. 1652)

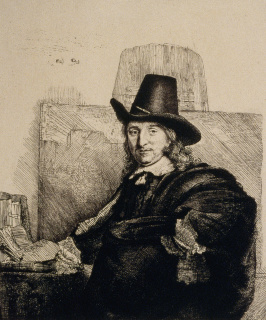
- Portrait of Jan Asselijn by Rembrandt, 1647
- Born: c. 1610; Dieppe, Kingdom of France
- Died: c. 1652; Amsterdam, Dutch Republic
- Known for: Painting

Jan Asselijn (c. 1610 – October 1, 1652) was a Dutch Golden Age painter.

== Biography ==
Asselijn was born at Dieppe from a French Huguenot family as Jean Asselin. He received instruction from Esaias van de Velde (1587–1630), and distinguished himself particularly in landscape and animal painting, though his historical works and battle pieces are also admired. He traveled in France and Italy, and modeled his style after Bamboccio (Pieter van Laer), also a member of the Bentvueghels. Nicolaes de Helt Stockade and Asselijn married two sisters in Lyons in 1645, both daughters of Houwaart Koorman of Antwerp. According to Houbraken, he heard this story from Abraham Genoels, who in turn heard it from Laurens Frank, an artist who was staying in the Koorman household with Artus Quellinus in Lyons at the time. Their marriages brought both Asselijn and Helt-Stockade back to the Netherlands after their travels. Asselijn had a withered hand and was small of stature, which gave him the nickname in France of petit Jean Hollandois, and which gave him the nickname Krabbetje (little claw) in the Bentvueghels.

He seems to have befriended Rembrandt. In the etching that Rembrandt made of him, Asselijn appears in some states to be standing before an easel. His hands are not shown. Frederick de Moucheron, another Italianate landscape painter, was his pupil.

He was one of the first Dutch painters who introduced a fresh and clear manner of painting landscapes in the style of Claude Lorrain, and his example was speedily followed by other artists. Asselijn's pictures were in high estimation at Amsterdam, and several of them are in the museums of that city. Twenty-four, painted in Italy, were engraved.

One of his paintings, The Threatened Swan, which portrays a swan aggressively defending its nest, became a symbol of Dutch national resistance, although it is unknown if Asselijn intended it to be so. In particular, it was interpreted as a depiction of Johan de Witt. Several inscriptions were added by later owners of the painting, including "Holland" on one of the eggs, and "Enemy of the state" next to the dog that is threatening the nest. Some parts of the painting are less realistic than the swan, such as the low-hanging clouds, the dog and the flat-looking eggs. The painting has been dated to the 1640s. It is considered to be Asselijn's most famous work and was the Rijksmuseum's first acquisition.

Willem Schellinks' City Wall in the Winter was long thought to be Asselijn's, until the painting was restored and the original monogram was revealed.

== Gallery ==
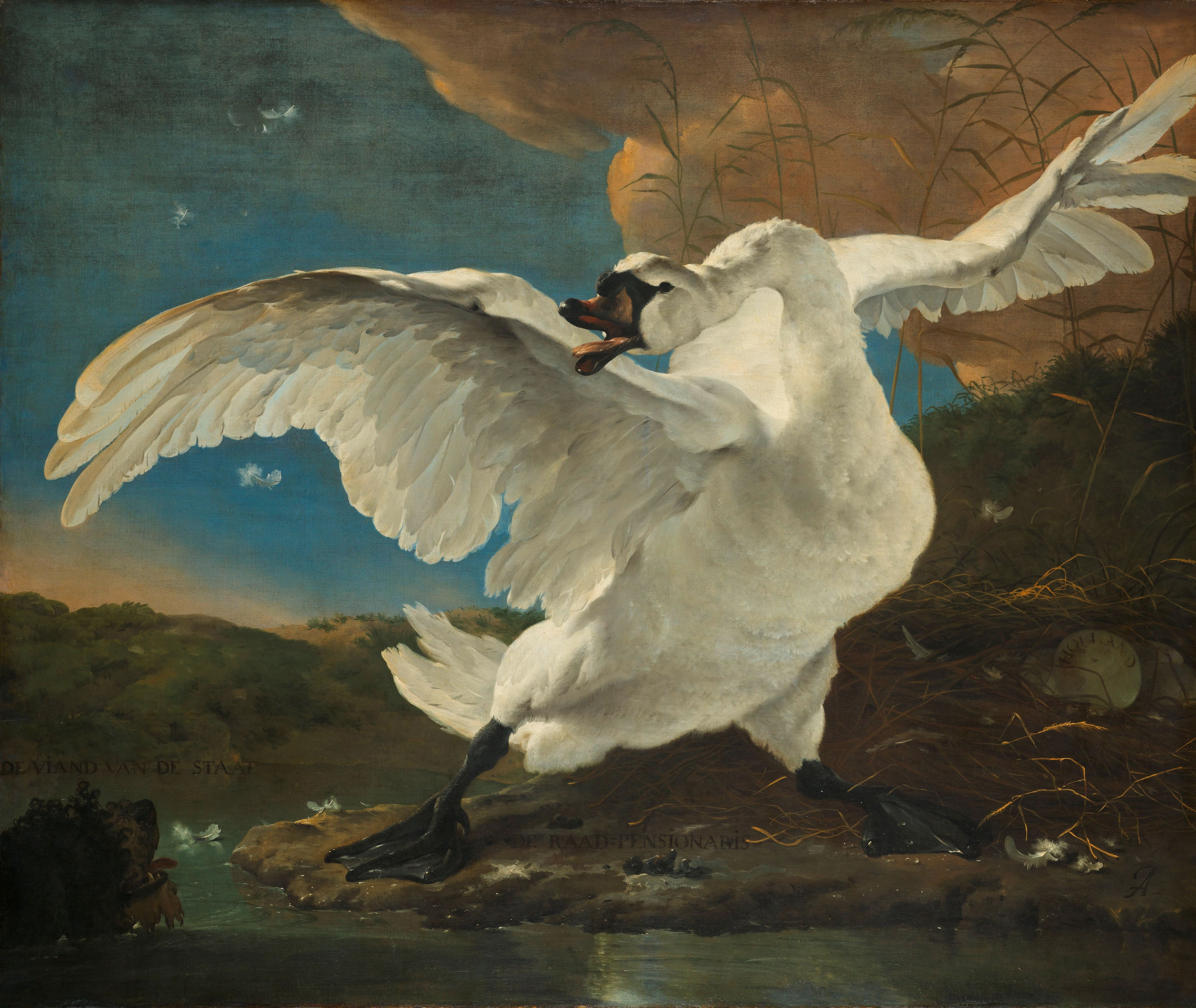
The Threatened Swan, one of the major works in the Rijksmuseum

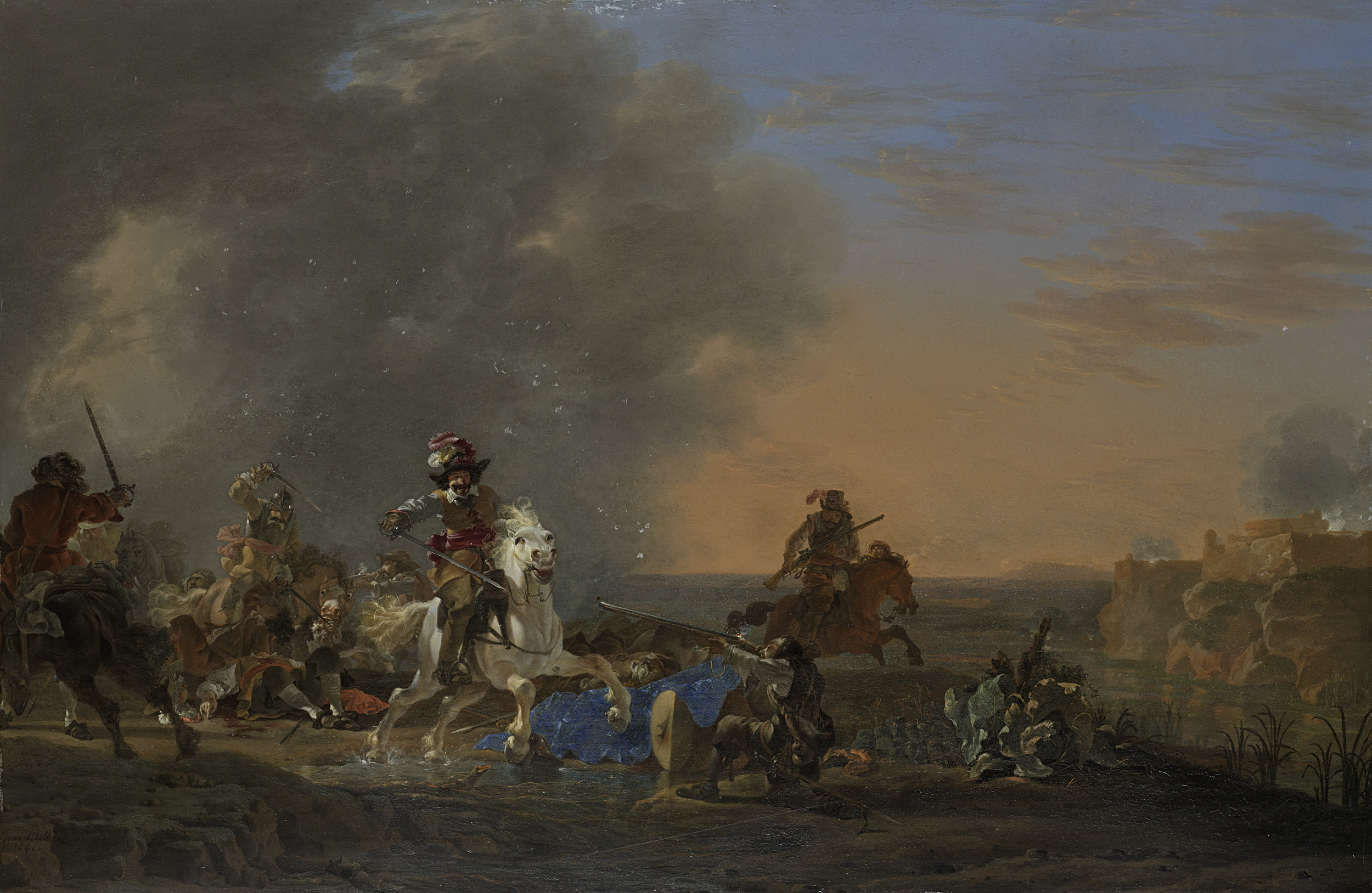
Cavalry charge at sunset. In the middle a kneeling musketman fires at an oncoming rider on a grey charger.

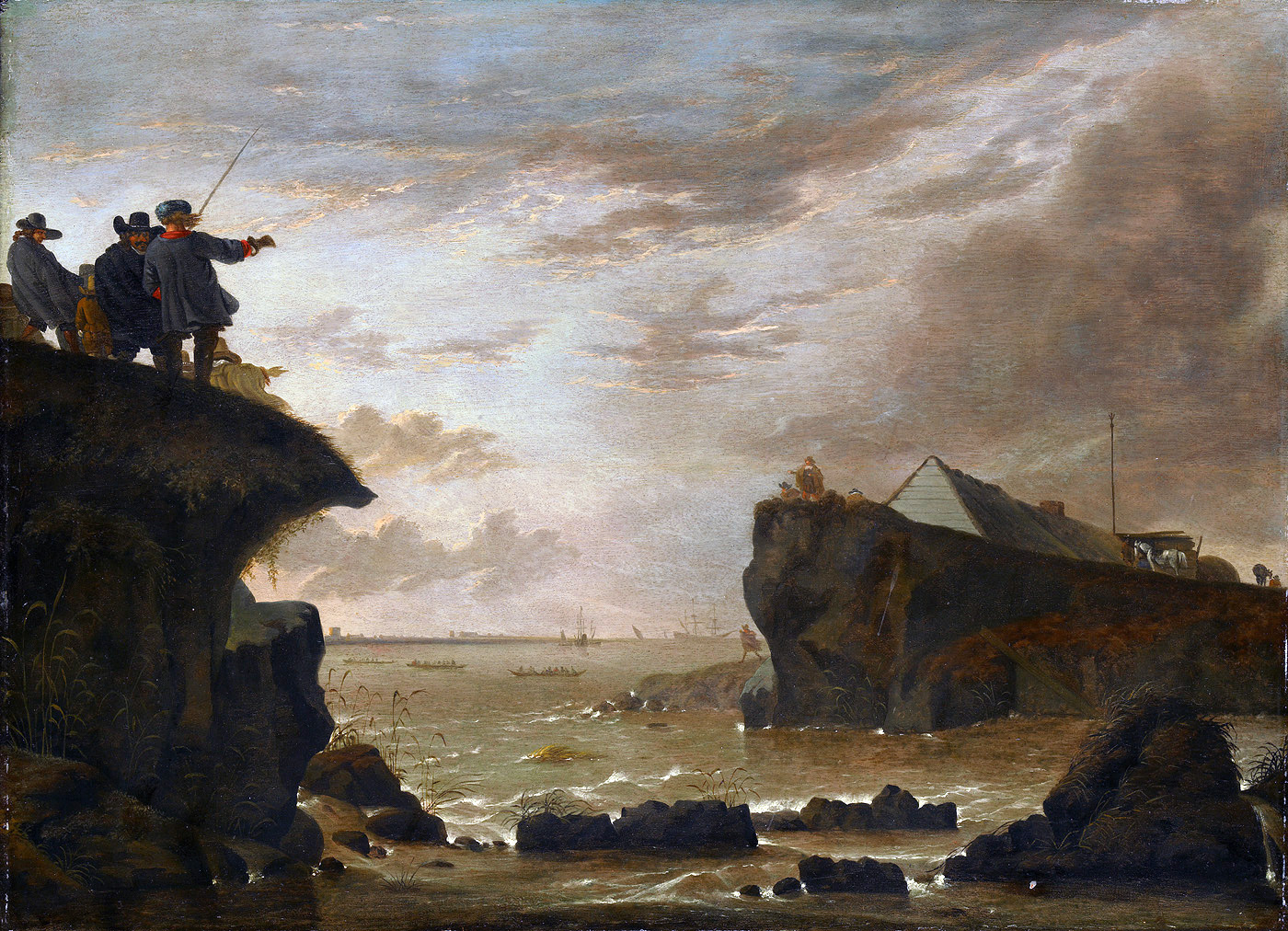
St. Anthonisdijk or St. Anthony's dyke breach at Houtewael burst in the night of 5–6 March 1651

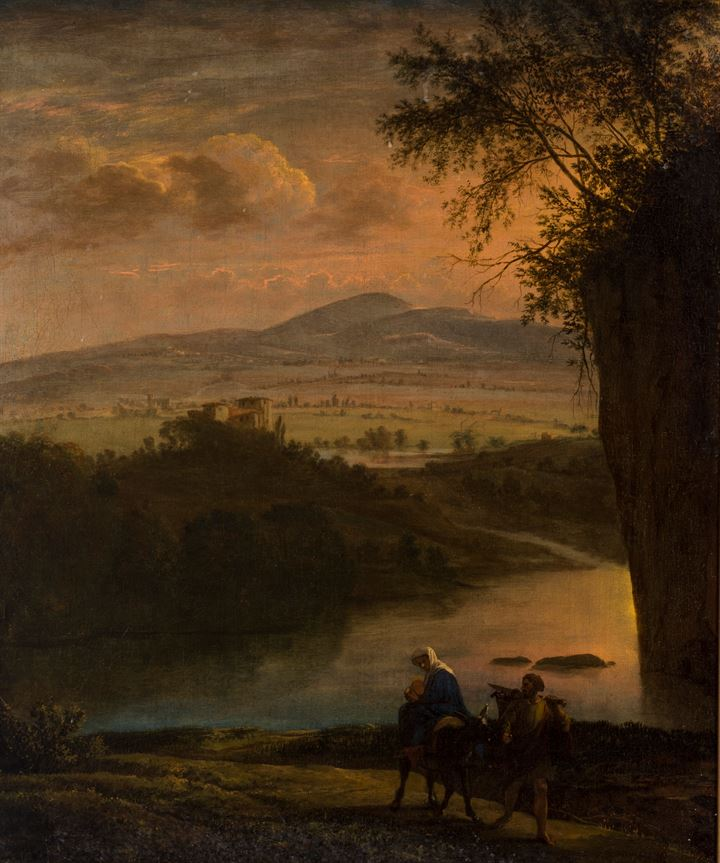
Flight into Egypt, 1640 circa

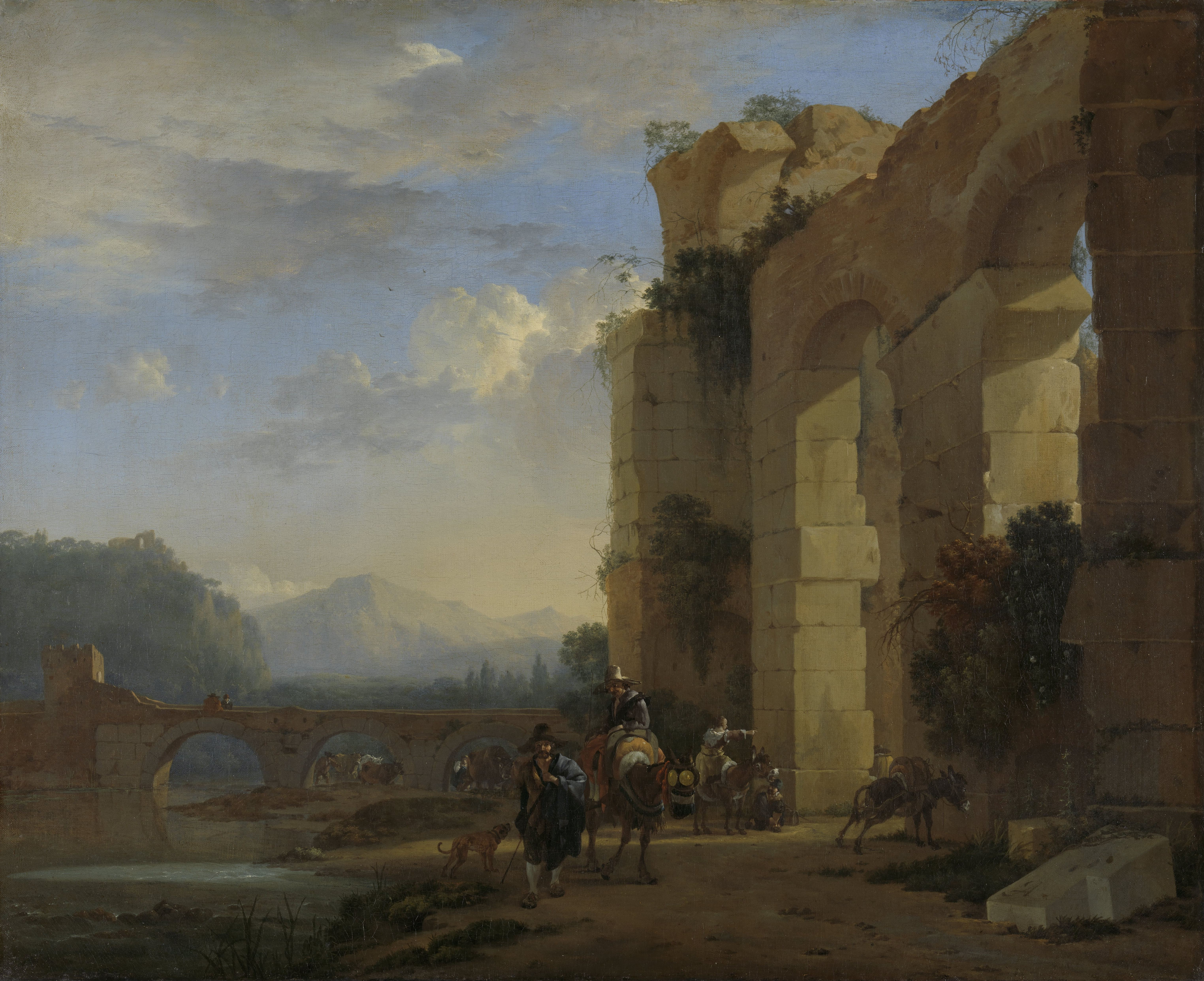
Italian Landscape with the Ruins of a Roman Bridge and Aqueduct, undated, oil on canvas, Rijksmuseum, Amsterdam

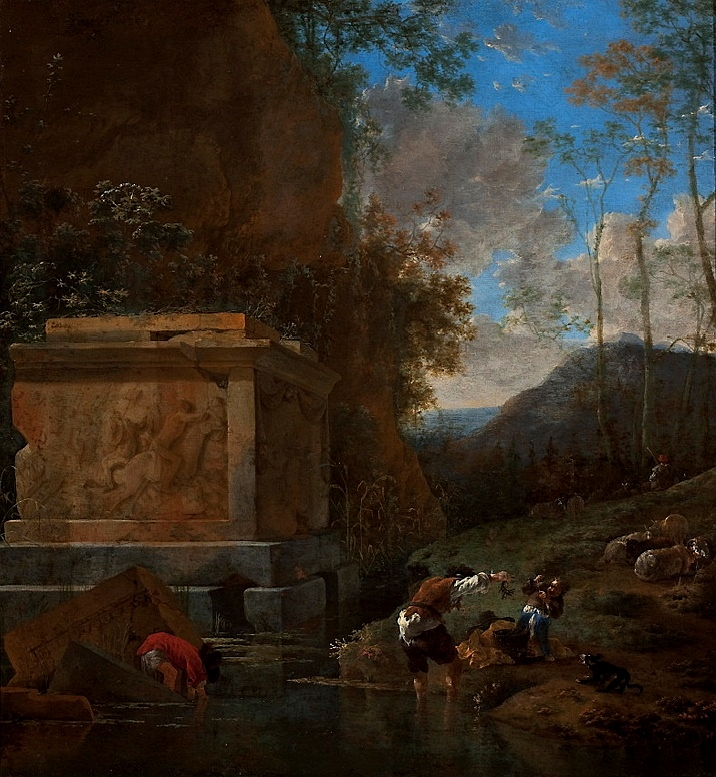
Catching Crayfish, circa 1645
