= Jan Wagenaar =

Dutch historian

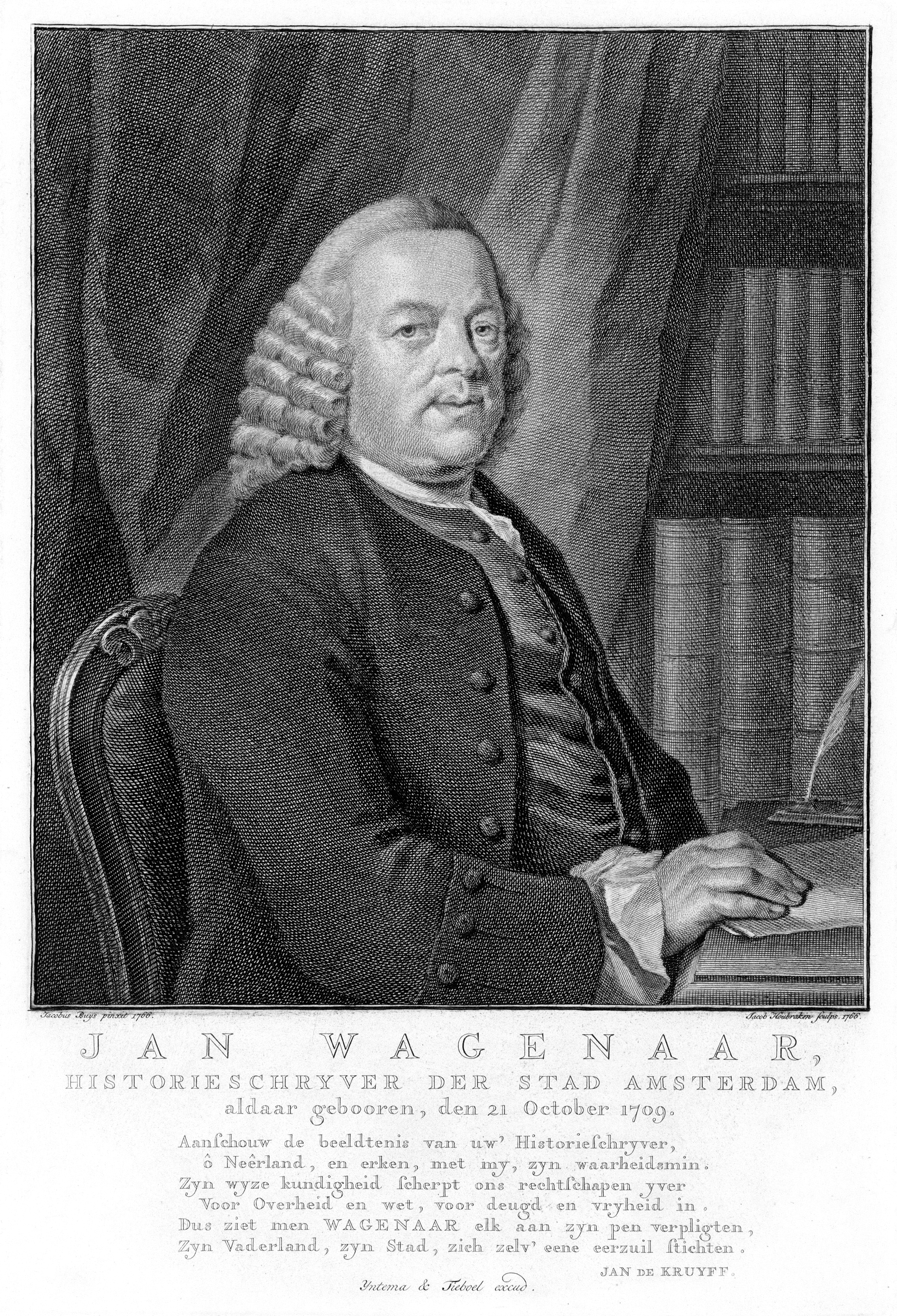
Jan Wagenaar

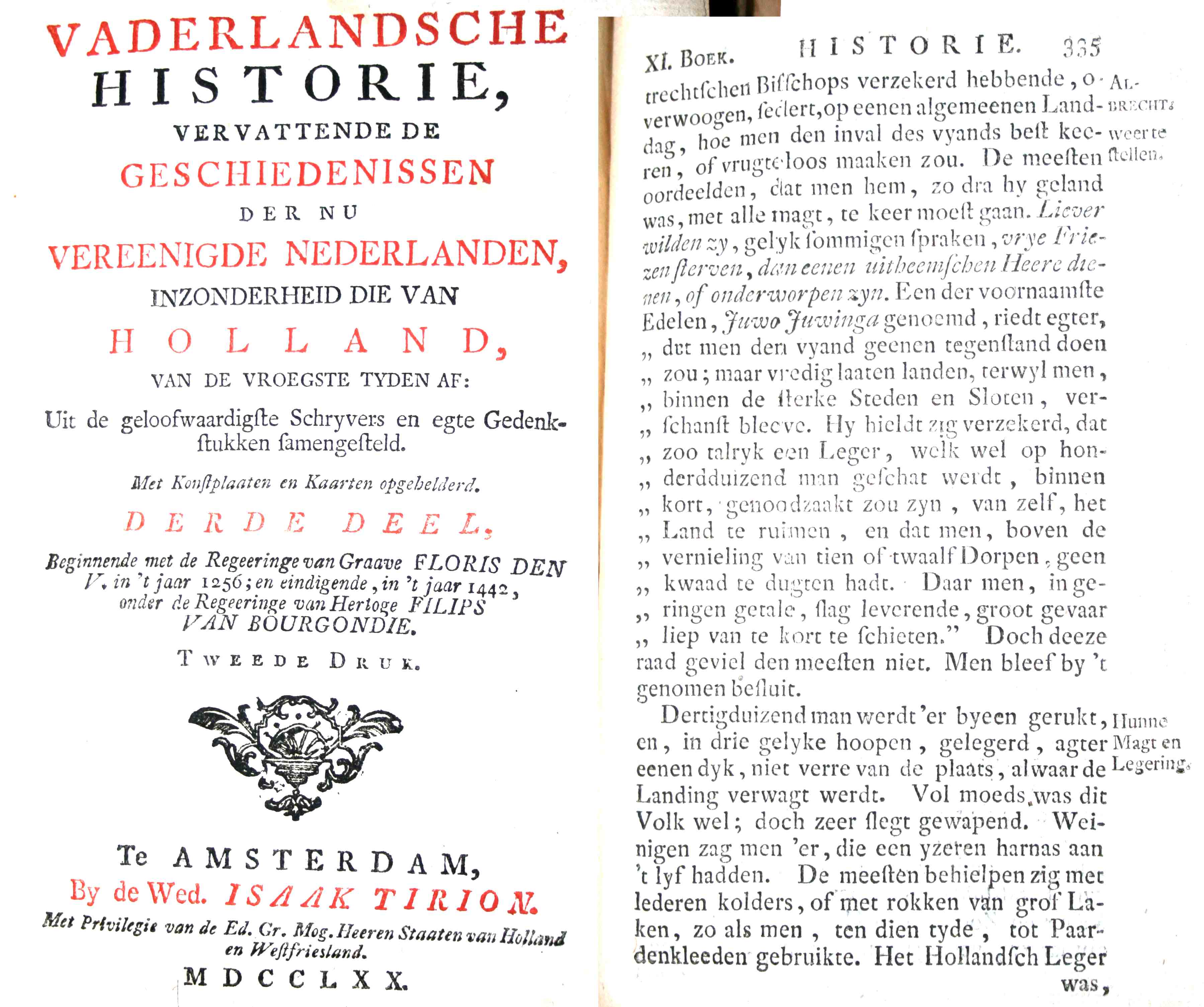
Vaderlandsche Historie

Jan Wagenaar (25 October 1709 – 1 March 1773) was a Dutch historian, best known for his contributions to Tegenwoordige staat van nederland and Vaderlandsche Historie.

== Biography ==
Wagenaar was born in Amsterdam to a Mennonite master shoemaker of the same name and Maria Saftleven, a descendant of the landscape painter Herman Saftleven. He was schooled in reading and mathematics and finished his education at a French school in Amsterdam. He was known for his poems and made his first play at age twelve, which was published without his consent. In 1722 another poem was published in Haarlem that he wrote for the village sacristan of Zandvoort. He was apprenticed to a Catholic merchant and later became a wood trader, but having trained himself in historical subjects through intense reading of the classics, he became a writer. His most famous work is Vaderlandsche historie (Amsterdam, 1749–1760, 21 vols), which became so popular it was continued by others (Amsterdam 1788–1810, 52 vols). This work is on the list of 1000 most important texts in the Canon of Dutch Literature. For this work, he at first in 1736 refused to publish his name as author, first revealing himself in the 20th volume in 1759. Jacobus Houbraken made numerous engravings for these books, that were published by Isaak Tirion of Amsterdam. In addition to Vaderlandsche historie, he also wrote descriptions of the United States, the Netherlands (Amsterdam. 1739, 12 vols) and Amsterdam (ib. 1760, 3 vols).
