= Jean Luzac =

Dutch lawyer, journalist and professor

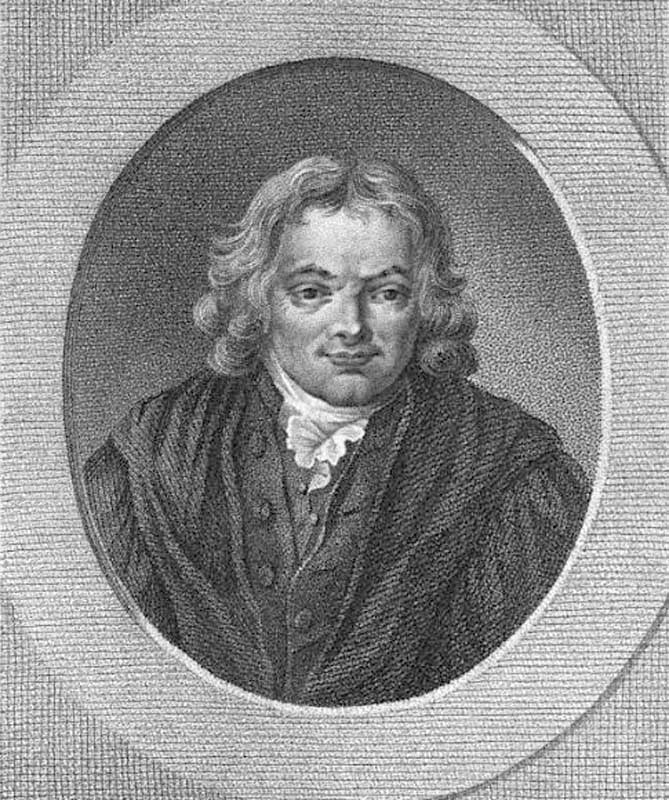
Jean Luzac.

Jean (also Johan or Joan) Luzac (August 1746, Leiden – January 12, 1807, Leiden) was a Dutch lawyer, journalist and professor in Greek and History, of Huguenot origin. He was the most influential newspaper editor in the Western world in the years immediately preceding the French Revolution, and his sister Emilie married his fellow Patriot Wijbo Fijnje.

His newspaper, the Gazette de Leyde, published in Leiden, served as Europe's newspaper of record. Its readers included Louis XVI, Voltaire, Thomas Jefferson, and all the influential rulers and diplomats of the day. Universally respected for the quality of its information, the Gazette supported the American revolutionaries and the Dutch Patriot movement of the 1780s. When John Adams arrived in the Netherlands, he immediately paid Luzac a visit, to provide him with full reports of the constitutional debates in America. Shortly after this, Luzac published a Dutch translation of the Massachusetts Constitution, which affected public opinion about the American War of Independence in the Netherlands. He was elected a Foreign Honorary Member of the American Academy of Arts and Sciences in 1789 and a member of the American Philosophical Society in 1791.

Luzac was critical of the violence of the French Revolution, however, and he had to abandon the editorship of the paper in 1798 for six months, under pressure from the pro-French government of the Batavian Republic. He died in a gunpowder barge explosion in Leiden in 1807.
