= List of state leaders in the 16th-century Holy Roman Empire =

This is a list of state leaders in the 16th century (1501–1600) AD, of the Holy Roman Empire.

== Main ==
- Holy Roman Empire, Kingdom of Germany

- Emperors Elect, Kings –

- Maximilian I, Emperor Elect (1508–1519), King (1486–1519)
- Charles V, Holy Roman Emperor (1530–1556), King (1519–1556)
- Ferdinand I, Emperor Elect (1558–1564), King (1531–1564)
- Maximilian II, Emperor Elect (1564–1576), King (1562–1576)
- Rudolph II, Emperor Elect (1576–1612), King (1575–1612)

- Imperial Vice Chancellors (Reichsvizekanzlers, 1527–1806) –

- Balthasar Merklin, Vice Chancellor (1527–1531)
- Matthias von Held, Vice Chancellor (1531–1541)
- Johann von Naves, Vice Chancellor (1541–1547)
- Jakob von Jonas, Vice Chancellor (1547–1558)
- Georg Sigmund Seld, Vice Chancellor (1559–1563)
- Johann Ulrich Zasius, Vice Chancellor (1566–1570)
- Siegmund Vieheuser, Vice Chancellor (1577–1587)
- Jacob Kurz von Senftenau, Vice Chancellor (1587–1594)
- Johann Wolfgang Freymann, Vice Chancellor (1594–1597)
- Rudolf Coraduz von und zu Nußdorf, Vice Chancellor (1597–1606)

== Austrian ==
- Archduchy of Austria (complete list) –

- Ladislaus I the Posthumous, Duke (1440–1453), Archduke (1453–1457)
- Frederick V the Peaceful, Archduke (1457–1493)
- Maximilian I the Last Knight, Archduke (1493–1519)
- Charles I, Archduke (1519–1521)
- Ferdinand I, Archduke (1521–1564)
- Maximilian II, Archduke (1564–1576)
- Rudolf V, Archduke (1576–1608)

- Prince-Bishopric of Brixen (complete list) –

- Melchior von Meckau, Prince-bishop (1488–1509)
- Christoph of Schroffenstein, Prince-bishop (1509–1521)
- Sebastian Sprenz, Prince-bishop (1521–1525)
- George of Austria, Prince-bishop (1525–1539)
- Bernardo Clesio, Prince-bishop (1539)
- Christoph Fuchs of Fuchsberg, Prince-bishop (1539–1542)
- Cristoforo Madruzzo, Prince-bishop (1542–1578)
- Johann Thomas of Spaur, Prince-bishop (1578–1591)
- Andrew of Burgau, Prince-bishop (1591–1600)

- Duchy of Carinthia (complete list) –

- Maximilian I, Duke (1493–1519)
- Charles I, Duke (1519–1521)
- Ferdinand I, Duke (1521–1564)
- Charles II, Duke (1564–1590)
- Ferdinand II, Duke (1590–1637)

- Prince-Bishopric of Chur (complete list) –

- Heinrich V. von Hewen, Prince-bishop (1491–1505)
- Paul Ziegler, Administrator (1505–1509), Administrator (1509–1541)
- Lucius Iter, Prince-bishop (1541–1549)
- Thomas Planta, Prince-bishop (1549–1565)
- Beatus a Porta, Prince-bishop (1565–1581)
- Peter de Raschèr, Prince-bishop (1581–1601)

- Principality of Heitersheim (complete list) –

- Georg II. Bombastus von Hohenheim, Prince-prior (1554–1566)
- Adam von Schwalbach, Prince-prior (1567–1573)
- Philipp Flach von Schwarzenberg, Prince-prior (1573–1594)
- Philip Riedesel zu Camberg, Prince-prior (1594–1598)
- Bernhard IV. von Angelach-Angelach, Prince-prior (1598–1599)
- Johann Philipp Lesch von Mühlheim, Prince-prior (1599–1601)

- Duchy of Styria (complete list) –

- Maximilian I, Duke (1493–1519)
- Charles I, Duke (1519–1521)
- Ferdinand I, Duke (1521–1564)
- Charles II, Duke (1564–1590)
- Ferdinand II, Duke (1590–1637)

- Prince-Bishopric of Trent (complete list) –

- Ulrich IV von Liechtenstein, Prince-bishop (1493–1505)
- George II von Neideck, Prince-bishop (1505–1514)
- Bernardo Clesio, Prince-bishop (1514–1539)
- Cristoforo Madruzzo, Prince-bishop (1539–1567)
- Ludovico Madruzzo, Prince-bishop (1567–1600)
- Carlo Gaudenzio Madruzzo, Prince-bishop (1600–1629)

- County of Tyrol (complete list) –

- Maximilian I, Count (1490–1519)

== Bavarian ==
- Duchy of Bavaria: Bavaria-Landshut, Bavaria-Munich, Bavaria-Dachau (complete list) –

- Sigismund, co-Duke of Bavaria-Munich (1460–1467), Duke of Bavaria-Dachau (1467–1501)
- George I the Rich, Duke of Bavaria-Landshut (1479–1503)
- Albert IV the Wise, Duke of Bavaria-Munich (1465–1505), of Bavaria (1505–1508)
- William IV the Steadfast, Duke of Bavaria-Munich (1460–1508), of Bavaria-Landshut (1503–1508), of Bavaria (1508–1550)
- Louis X, co-Duke (1516–1545)
- Albert V the Magnanimous, Duke (1550–1579)
- William V the Pious, Duke (1579–1597)
- Maximilian I, Duke (1597–1623), Elector (1623–1651)

- Berchtesgaden Prince-Provostry (complete list) –

- Balthasar Hirschauer, Provost (1496–1508)
- Gregor Rainer, Provost (1508–1522)
- Wolfgang I Lenberger, Provost (1523–1541)
- Wolfgang II Griestätter, Provost (1541–1559), Prince-provost (1559–1567)
- Jakob II Putrich, Prince-provost (1567–1594)
- Ferdinand of Bavaria, Prince-provost (1594–1650)

- Prince-Bishopric of Freising (complete list) –

- Philip of the Palatinate, Prince-bishop (1498–1541)
- Henry II of the Palatinate, Prince-bishop (1541–1552)
- Leo Lösch of Hilkertshausen, Prince-bishop (1552–1559)
- Moritz of Sandizell, Prince-bishop (1559–1566)
- Ernest of Bavaria, Prince-bishop (1566–1612)

- Landgraviate of Leuchtenberg (de:complete list) –

- John IV, Landgrave (1487–1531)
- George III, Landgrave (1531–1555)
- Louis Henry, Landgrave (1555–1567)
- Georg IV. Ludwig (Leuchtenberg), Landgrave (1567–1613)

- Prince-Abbey of Niedermünster (complete list) –

- Agnes von Rothafft, Abbess (1475–1520)
- Barbara II von Aham, Abbess (1520–1569)
- Anna II von Kirmbreith, Abbess (1569–1598)
- Katharina II Scheifflin, Abbess (1598–1605)

- Prince-Abbey of Obermünster (complete list) –

- Agnes II von Paulsdorff, Abbess (1500–?)
- Katharina II von Redwitz, Abbess (1533–1536)
- Wandula von Schaumberg, Abbess (1536–1542)
- Barbara II von Sandizell, Abbess (?–1564)
- Barbara III Ratzin, Abbess (1564–1579)
- Magdalena von Gleissenthal, Abbess (1579–1594)
- Margarethe II Mufflin, Abbess (1594–1608)

- Imperial County of Ortenburg (complete list) –

- Wolfgang, Count (1490–1519)
- Ulrich II, Count (1519–1524)
- Christoph, Count (1524–1551)
- Joachim, Count (1551–1600)
- Henry VII, Count (1600–1603)

- Pappenheim (complete list) –

- William, Lord (1482–1508)
- Joachim, Lord (1508–1536)
- Wolfgang I, Lord (1536–1558)
- Christopher, Lord (1558–1569)
- Wolfgang II, Lord (1558–1585)
- Philip, Lord (1558–1619)

- Prince-Bishopric of Passau (complete list) –

- Wiguleus Fröschl of Marzoll, Prince-Bishop (1500–1517)
- Ernest of Bavaria, Administrator (1517–1541)
- Wolfgang of Salm, Prince-Bishop (1541–1555)
- Wolfgang of Closen, Prince-Bishop (1555–1561)
- Urban of Trennbach, Prince-Bishop (1561–1598)
- Leopold V, Archduke of Austria, Prince-Bishop (1598–1625)

- Palatinate-Sulzbach –

- Otto Henry, Count (1569–1604)

- Prince-Bishopric of Regensburg (complete list) –

- Rupert II, Prince-bishop (1492–1507)
- John III of the Palatinate, Prince-bishop (1507–1538)
- Pankraz von Sinzenhofen, Prince-bishop (1538–1548)
- Georg von Pappenheim, Prince-bishop (1548–1563)
- Vitus von Fraunberg, Prince-bishop (1563–1567)
- David Kölderer von Burgstall, Prince-bishop (1567–1579)
- Philipp von Bayern, Prince-bishop (1579–1598)
- Sigmund von Fugger, Prince-bishop (1598–1600)
- Wolfgang II von Hausen, Prince-bishop (1600–1613)

- Prince-Archbishopric of Salzburg (complete list) –

- Leonhard von Keutschach, Prince-archbishop (1495–1519)
- Matthäus Lang von Wellenburg, Prince-archbishop (1519–1540)
- Ernest of Bavaria, Prince-archbishop (1540–1554)
- Michael of Khuenburg, Prince-archbishop (1554–1560)
- John Jacob of Khun-Bellasy, Prince-archbishop (1560–1586)
- George of Kuenburg, Prince-archbishop (1586–1587)
- Wolf Dietrich von Raitenau, Prince-archbishop (1587–1612)

== Bohemian and Hungary ==
Bohemia, Hungary

- Kingdom of Bohemia, Kingdom of Hungary (1301–1526)/(1526–1867), Margraviate of Moravia (complete list, complete list, complete list) –

- Vladislaus II, King of Bohemia (1471–1516), of Hungary (1490–1516), Margrave (1490–1516)
- Louis II, King, Margrave (1516–1526)
- John, contested King of Hungary (1526–1540)
- John Sigismund, contested King of Hungary (1540–1551, 1556–1570)
- Ferdinand I, King (1526–1564), Margrave (1527–1564)
- Maximilian II, King of Bohemia (1562–1576), of Hungary, Margrave (1564–1576)
- Rudolph II, King of Bohemia (1576–1611), of Hungary, Margrave (1576–1608)

- Duchy of Cieszyn (Teschen) (complete list) –

- Casimir II, Duke (1477–1528)
- Wenceslaus II, Duke (1518–1524)
- Wenceslaus III Adam, Duke (1528–1579)
- Adam Wenceslaus, Duke (1579–1617)

== Burgundian-Low Countries ==
- County of Artois (complete list) –

For the preceding rulers, see the County of Artois under the List of state leaders in the 15th century

- Philip I of Castile, Count (1482–1506)
- Charles V, Holy Roman Emperor, Count (1506–1556)

under the Pragmatic Sanction of 1549 Charles V united Artois with the other lordships of the Low Countries

- Philip II of Spain, Count (1556–1598)
- Isabella Clara Eugenia, Countess, and Albert, Count (1598–1621)

- County of Burgundy (complete list) –

- Philip VI the Handsome, Count (1482–1506)
- Charles II, Count (1506–1556)
- Philip VII, Count (1556–1598)
- Isabella Clara Eugenia, Countess, and Albert, Count (1598–1621)

- Duchy of Brabant (complete list) –

- Philip III, Duke (1494–1506)
- Charles II, Duke (1506–1555)
- Philip IV, Duke (1555–1598)
- Isabella Clara Eugenia, Duchess, Albert, Duke (1598–1621)

- County of Drenthe (complete list) –

For the preceding rulers, see the County of Drenthe under the #Lower Rhenish–Westphalian

- Jean de Ligne, Stadtholder (1549–1568)
- Charles de Brimeu, Stadtholder (1568–1572)
- Gillis of Berlaymont, Stadtholder (1572–1574)
- Caspar de Robles, Stadtholder (1574–1576)
- George de Lalaing, Stadtholder (1576–1581)

For the succeeding rulers, see the County of Drenthe under the List of state leaders in the 16th century

- County of Flanders (complete list) –

- Philip IV the Handsome, Count (1482–1506)
- Charles III, Count (1506–1555)
- Philip V, Count (1555–1598)
- Isabella Clara Eugenia, Countess (1598–1621)

- Lordship of Frisia (complete list) –

- Floris van Egmont, Stadtholder (1515–1518)
- Wilhelm von Roggendorf, Stadtholder (1518–1521)
- Georg Schenck van Tautenburg, Stadtholder (1521–1540)
- Jancko Douwama, Frisian rebel/ Stadtholder (1522–?)
- Maximiliaan van Egmond, Stadtholder (1559–1548)
- Jean de Ligne, Stadtholder (1559–1568)
- Charles de Brimeu, Stadtholder (1568–1572)
- Gillis van Berlaymont, Stadtholder (1572–1574)
- Caspar de Robles, Stadtholder (1574–1576)
- George de Lalaing, Stadtholder (1576–1581)

For the succeeding rulers, see the Lordship of Frisia under the List of state leaders in the 16th century

- Lordship of Groningen (complete list) –

For the preceding rulers, see the Lordship of Groningen under the #Lower Rhenish–Westphalian

- Jean de Ligne, Stadtholder (1549–1568)
- Charles de Brimeu, Stadtholder (1568–1572)
- Gillis van Berlaymont, Stadtholder (1572–1574)
- Caspar de Robles, Stadtholder (1574–1576)
- George de Lalaing, Stadtholder (1576–1581)

For the succeeding rulers, see the Lordship of Groningen under the List of state leaders in the 16th century

- Duchy of Guelders

For the preceding rulers, see the Duchy of Guelders under the #Lower Rhenish–Westphalian

- Dukes (complete list) –

under the Pragmatic Sanction of 1549 Charles V united Guelders with the other lordships of the Low Countries

- Charles V, Duke (1543–1555)
- Philip II, Duke (1555–1598)

- Stadtholders (complete list) –

- Philip de Lalaing, Stadtholder (1544–1555)
- Philip de Montmorency, Stadtholder (1555–1560)
- Karel van Brimeu, Stadtholder (1560–1572)
- Gillis van Berlaymont, Stadtholder (1572–1577)
- Johann VI, Stadtholder (1578–1581)
For the succeeding rulers, see the Duchy of Guelders under the List of state leaders in the 16th century

- Upper Guelders (complete list) –

For the preceding rulers, see the Upper Guelders under the #Lower Rhenish–Westphalian

- Jan van Argenteau, Stadtholder (1579–1589)
- Marcus de Rye de la Palud, Stadtholder (1589–1592)
- Charles of Ligne, Stadtholder (1592–1593)
- Herman van den Bergh, Stadtholder (1593–1611)

- County of Hainaut (complete list) –

- Philip I de Croÿ, Stadtholder (1482–1511)
- Charles I de Croÿ, Stadtholder (1511–1521)
- Philip II de Croÿ, Stadtholder (1521–1549)
- Charles II de Lalaing, Stadtholder (1549–1558)
- Charles de Brimeu, Stadtholder (1558–1560)
- John IV of Glymes, Stadtholder (1560–1566)
- Philip of Noircarmes, Stadtholder (1566–1574)
- Philip de Lalaing, Stadtholder (1574–1582)
- Emanuel Philibert de Lalaing, Stadtholder (1582–1590)
- Charles III de Croÿ, Stadtholder (1592–1606)

- County of Holland and County of Zeeland

- Counts (complete list) –

under the Pragmatic Sanction of 1549 Charles V united Holland with the other lordships of the Low Countries

- Philip II the Handsome, Count (1494–1506)
- Charles II, Count (1515–1555)
- Philip III, Count (1555–1581)

- Stadtholders (complete list) –

- Jan III van Egmond, Stadtholder (1483–1515)
- Henry III of Nassau-Breda, Stadtholder (1515–1521)
- Antoon I van Lalaing, Stadtholder (1522–1540)
- René of Châlon, Stadtholder (1540–1544)
- Louis of Flanders, Stadtholder (1544–1546)
- Maximilian of Burgundy, Stadtholder (1547–1558)
- William I, Stadtholder (1559–1567)
- Maximilien de Hénin, Stadtholder (1567–1573)
- Philip of Noircarmes, Stadtholder (1573–1574)
- Gillis van Berlaymont, Stadtholder (1574–1577)
- William I, Stadtholder (1572–1584)

- Grand pensionaries (complete list) –

- Frans Coebel van der Loo, Grand Pensionary (1500–1513)
- Albrecht van Loo, Grand Pensionary (1513–1524)
- Aert van der Goes, Grand Pensionary (1525–1544)
- Adriaen van der Goes, Grand Pensionary (1544–1560)
- Jacob van den Eynde, Grand Pensionary (1560–1568)
- Paulus Buys, Grand Pensionary (1572–1584)
- Johan van Oldenbarnevelt, Grand Pensionary (1586–1619)

For the succeeding rulers, look under the List of state leaders in the 16th century

- Duchy of Limburg (complete list) –

- Philip III the Handsome, Duke (1482–1506)
- Charles II, Duke (1506–1555)

under the Pragmatic Sanction of 1549 Charles V united Limburg with the other lordships of the Low Countries

- Philip IV, Duke (1555–1598)
- Isabella, Duchess, and Albert, Duke (1598–1621)

- Duchy of Luxembourg

For the preceding rulers, see the Duchy of Luxemburg under the #Lower Rhenish–Westphalian

- Dukes (complete list) –

under the Pragmatic Sanction of 1549 Charles V united Luxembourg with the other lordships of the Low Countries

- Philip III, Duke (1556–1598)
- Isabella Clara Eugenia, Duchess, and Albert, Duke (1598–1621)

- Stadtholders (complete list) –

- Peter Ernst I von Mansfeld-Vorderort, Stadtholder (1545–1552, 1559–1604)
- Maarten van Rossum, Stadtholder (1552–1555)
- Charles de Brimeu, Stadtholder (1556–1558)

- County of Namur (complete list) –

- Maximilian, Margrave (1493–1519)
- Charles II, Margrave (1519–1556)

under the Pragmatic Sanction of 1549 Charles V united Namur with the other lordships of the Low Countries

- Philip V, Margrave (1556–1598)
- Isabella Clara Eugenia, Margravine (1598–1621)

- Lordship of Overijssel (complete list) –

For the preceding rulers, see the Lordship of Overijssel under the #Lower Rhenish–Westphalian

- Jean de Ligne, Stadtholder (1548–1568)
- Charles de Brimeu, Stadtholder (1568–1572)
- Gillis van Berlaymont, Stadtholder (1572–1573)
- Caspar de Robles, Stadtholder (1573–1576)
- George de Lalaing, Stadtholder (1576–1581)

For the succeeding rulers, see the Lordship of Overijssel under the List of state leaders in the 16th century

- Lordship of Utrecht

- Lords –

- Charles II, Count (1528–1555)

under the Pragmatic Sanction of 1549 Charles V united Utrecht with the other lordships of the Low Countries

- Philip III, Count (1555–1581)

- Stadtholders (complete list) –

- Antoon I van Lalaing, Stadtholder (1528–1540)
- René of Châlon, Stadtholder (1540–1544)
- Louis of Flanders, Stadtholder (1544–1546)
- Maximilian of Burgundy, Stadtholder (1547–1558)
For the succeeding rulers, see the Lordship of Utrecht under the #Burgundian-Low Countries

== Franconian ==
- Prince-Bishopric of Bamberg (complete list) –

- Heinrich Groß von Trockau, Prince-bishop (1487–1501)
- Veit Truchseß von Pommersfelden, Prince-bishop (1501–1503)
- Georg Marschalk von Ebnet, Prince-bishop (1503–1505)
- Georg Schenk von Limpurg, Prince-bishop (1505–1522)
- Weigand von Redwitz, Prince-bishop (1522–1556)
- Georg Fuchs von Rügheim, Prince-bishop (1556–1561)
- Veit von Würzburg, Prince-bishop (1561–1577)
- Johann Georg Zobel von Giebelstadt, Prince-bishop (1577–1580)
- Martin von Eyb, Prince-bishop (1580–1583)
- Ernst von Mengersdorf, Prince-bishop (1583–1591)
- Neytard von Thüngen, Prince-bishop (1591–1598)
- Johann Philipp von Gebsattel, Prince-bishop (1599–1609)

- Brandenburg-Ansbach (complete list) –

- Frederick the Elder, Margrave of Brandenburg-Ansbach (1486–1536), of Brandenburg-Kulmbach (1495–1515)
- George I the Pious, Regent of Brandenburg-Kulmbach (1527–1541), Margrave of Brandenburg-Ansbach (1536–1543)
- Joachim II Hector, Elector of Brandenburg, Regent (1543–c.1548)
- Philip I, Landgrave of Hesse, Regent (1543–c.1548)
- John Frederick I, Elector of Saxony, Regent (1543–1547)
- Maurice, Elector of Saxony, Regent (1547–c.1548)
- George Frederick I, Margrave of Brandenburg-Ansbach (1543–1603), of Brandenburg-Kulmbach (1553–1603)

- Brandenburg-Kulmbach (Brandenburg-Bayreuth) (complete list) –

- Frederick the Elder, Margrave of Brandenburg-Ansbach (1486–1536), of Brandenburg-Kulmbach (1495–1515)
- Casimir, Margrave (1515–1527)
- George I the Pious, Regent of Brandenburg-Kulmbach (1527–1541), Margrave of Brandenburg-Ansbach (1536–1543)
- Albert Alcibiades, Margrave (1527–1553)
- George Frederick I, Margrave of Brandenburg-Ansbach (1543–1603), of Brandenburg-Kulmbach (1553–1603)

- County of Castell (complete list) –

- George I, Count (1498–1528)
- Wolfgang I, Count (1498–1546)
- Conrad II, Count (1546–1577)
- Frederick XI, Count (1546–1552)
- Henry IV, Count (1546–1595)
- George II, Count (1546–1597)

partitioned into Castell-Remlingen and Castell-Rüdenhausen

- Prince-Bishopric of Eichstätt (complete list, de) –

- Gabriel von Eyb, Prince-bishop (1496–1535)
- Christoph von Pappenheim-Stahlingen, Prince-bishop (1535–1539)
- Moritz von Hutten, Prince-bishop (1539–1552)
- Eberhard II von Hirnheim, Prince-bishop (1552–1560)
- Martin von Schaumberg, Prince-bishop (1560–1590)
- Kaspar von Seckendorff, Prince-bishop (1590–1595)
- Johann Konrad von Gemmingen, Prince-bishop (1595–1612)

- Hohenlohe-Neuenstein –

- Ludwig Kasimir, Count (1551–1568)
- Albrecht, co-Count (1568–c.1586)
- Friedrich, co-Count of Hohenlohe-Neuenstein (1568–1586), Count of Hohenlohe-Langenburg (1586–1590)
- Philipp, co-Count of Hohenlohe-Neuenstein (1568–1586), Count (1586–1606)
- Wolfgang, co-Count of Hohenlohe-Neuenstein (1568–1586), Count of Hohenlohe-Weikersheim (1586–1606), of Hohenlohe-Neuenstein (1586–1610)

- Hohenlohe-Waldenburg-Pfedelbach –

- Ludwig Eberhard of Hohenlohe-Waldenburg-Pfedelbach (1600–1650)

- Hohenlohe-Weikersheim –

- Kraft VI, Count (1472–1503)
- Georg, Count (1503–1551)
- Eberhard von Hohenlohe-Waldenburg, Count (1551–1570)
- Wolfgang, co-Count of Hohenlohe-Neuenstein (1568–1586), Count of Hohenlohe-Weikersheim (1586–1606), of Hohenlohe-Neuenstein (1586–1610)
- Georg Friedrich I. von Hohenlohe-Waldenburg, Count (1570–1600)
- Georg Friedrich II, Count (1600–1635)

- Prince-Bishopric of Würzburg (complete list) –

- Lorenz von Bibra, Prince-bishop (1495–1519)
- Konrad von Thüngen, Prince-bishop (1519–1540)
- Conrad von Bibra, Prince-bishop (1540–1544)
- Melchior Zobel von Giebelstadt, Prince-bishop (1544–1558)
- Friedrich von Wirsberg, Prince-bishop (1558–1573)
- Julius Echter von Mespelbrunn, Prince-bishop (1573–1617)

== Electoral Rhenish ==
- Arenberg (complete list) –

- Margaret, Countess (1544–1576), Princely Countess (1576–1599), and Jean de Ligne, Count (1547–1568)
- Charles, Princely Count (1599–1616)

- Elector-Archbishopric of Cologne (complete list) –

- Hermann IV of Hesse, Archbishop-elector (1480–1508)
- Philip II of Daun-Oberstein, Archbishop-elector (1508–1515)
- Hermann V von Wied, Archbishop-elector (1515–1546)
- Adolf III of Schauenburg, Archbishop-elector (1546–1556)
- Anton of Schauenburg, Archbishop-elector (1556–1558)
- Gebhard I von Mansfeld-Vorderort, Archbishop-elector (1558–1562)
- Friedrich IV of Wied, Archbishop-elector (1562–1567)
- Salentin von Isenburg-Grenzau, Archbishop-elector (1567–1577)
- Gebhard II Truchsess von Waldburg, Archbishop-elector (1577–1583)
- Ernest of Bavaria, Archbishop-elector (1583–1612)

- Elector-Bishopric of Mainz (complete list) –

- Berthold von Henneberg, Archbishop-elector (1484–1504)
- Jakob von Liebenstein, Archbishop-elector (1504–1508)
- Uriel von Gemmingen, Archbishop-elector (1508–1514)
- Albert of Brandenburg, Archbishop-elector (1514–1545)
- Sebastian von Heusenstamm, Archbishop-elector (1545–1555)
- Daniel Brendel von Homburg, Archbishop-elector (1555–1582)
- Wolfgang von Dalberg, Archbishop-elector (1582–1601)

- Nieder-Isenburg (Lower Isenburg) (complete list) –

- Gerlach II, Count (1488–1502)
- Heinrich, Count (1521/22–1553)
- Johann Heinrich, Count (c.1565)
- Arnold, Count (?–1577)
- Salentin VIII, Count (1577–1610)

- Electoral Palatinate (complete list) –

Palatinate-Neuburg
Palatinate-Simmern
Palatinate-Veldenz
Palatinate-Veldenz-Gutenberg
Palatinate-Veldenz-Lützelstein
Palatinate-Zweibrücken
Palatinate-Zweibrücken-Birkenfeld
Palatinate-Zweibrücken-Vohenstrauss-Parkstein

- Philip I the Upright, Elector (1476–1508)
- John I, Count Palatine of Simmern (1480–1509)
- Alexander I the Lame, Count Palatine of Zweibrücken (1489–1514)
- Philip I the Warlike, co-Count Palatine of Neuburg (1505–1541)
- Otto Henry I the Magnanimous, Count Palatine of Neuburg (1505–1557)
- Louis V the Pacific, Elector (1508–1544)
- John II, Count Palatine of Simmern (1509–1557)
- Louis II the Younger, Count Palatine of Zweibrücken (1514–1532)
- Robert I, Count Palatine of Zweibrücken (1532–1543)
- Robert I, Count Palatine of Veldenz (1543–1544)
- Wolfgang I, Count Palatine of Zweibrücken (1532–1569)
- Wolfgang I, Count Palatine of Neuburg (1557–1569)
- Frederick III the Wise, Elector (1544–1556)
- George John I the Astute, Count Palatine of Veldenz (1560–1592)
- Otto Henry I the Magnanimous, Elector (1556–1559)
- Frederick III the Pious, Count Palatine of Simmern (1557–1559)
- Frederick III the Pious, Elector (1559–1576)
- George, Count Palatine of Simmern (1559–1569)
- Richard, Count Palatine of Simmern (1569–1598)
- John I the Lame, Count Palatine of Zweibrücken (1569–1604)
- Frederick I, Count Palatine of Zweibrücken-Vohenstrauss-Parkstein (1569–1597)
- Otto Henry, Count Palatine of Sulzbach (1569–1604)
- Charles I, Count Palatine of Zweibrücken-Birkenfeld (1569–1600)
- Philip Louis, Count Palatine of Neuburg (1569–1604)
- Louis VI the Careless, Elector (1576–1583)
- Frederick IV the Righteous, Elector (1583–1610)
- Anna of Sweden, Regent (1592–1598)
- George Gustavus, Count Palatine of Veldenz (1598–1634)
- John Augustus, Count Palatine of Veldenz-Lützelstein (1598–1611)
- Louis Philip I, Count Palatine of Veldenz-Gutenberg (1598–1601)
- George John II, Count Palatine of Veldenz-Gutenberg (1598–1654)

- County of Schaumburg (complete list) –

- Otto III, Count (1492–1510)
- Antonius, Count (1510–1526)
- Johann IV, Count (1526–1527)
- Jobst I, Count (1527–1531)
- Johann IV, Count (1531–1560)
- Jobst II, Count (1531–1581)
- Otto IV, Count (1544–1576)
- Adolf XI, Count (1576–1601)

- Elector-Bishopric of Trier (complete list) –

- Johann II of Baden, Archbishop-elector (1456–1503)
- Jakob von Baden, Archbishop-elector (1503–1511)
- Richard von Greiffenklau zu Vollrads, Archbishop-elector (1511–1531)
- Johann von Metzenhausen, Archbishop-elector (1531–1540)
- Johann Ludwig von Hagen, Archbishop-elector (1540–1547)
- John of Isenburg-Grenzau, Archbishop-elector (1547–1556)
- Johann von der Leyen, Archbishop-elector (1556–1567)
- Jakob von Eltz-Rübenach, Archbishop-elector (1567–1581)
- Johann von Schönenberg, Archbishop-elector (1581–1599)
- Lothar von Metternich, Archbishop-elector (1599–1623)

== Lower Rhenish–Westphalian ==
- Bentheim-Bentheim (complete list) –

- Eberwin II, Count (1473–1530)

- Bentheim-Lingen (complete list) –

- Otto, Count (1450–1508)
- Nicholas III, Count (1493–1508)
- Nicholas IV, Count (1508–1541)
- Conrad, Count (1541–1547)
- Maximilian, Count (1547–1548)
- Anna, Count (1548–1555)

- Bentheim-Steinfurt (complete list) –

- Arnold II, Count (1498–1544)
- Eberwin III, Count (1544–1562)
- Arnold III, Count (1562–1606)
- Anna of Tecklenburg, Regent (1562–1577)

- Bentheim-Tecklenburg (complete list) –

- Otto VIII, Count (1493–1526)
- Conrad of Bentheim-Lingen, Count (1526–1557)

- Bentheim-Tecklenburg(-Rheda) (complete list, complete list) –

- Arnold III, Count of Bentheim-Tecklenburg (1562–1606)

- Prince-Archbishopric of Bremen (complete list) –

- John Frederick, Prince-archbishop (1596–1634)

- Duchy of Cleves, County of Mark (complete list, complete list) –

- John II the Pious, Duke of Cleves, Countof Mark (1481–1521)
- John III the Peaceful, Duke of Cleves, Count of Mark (1521–1539)
- William the Rich, Duke of Cleves, Count of Mark (1539–1592)
- John William, Duke of Cleves, Count of Mark (1592–1609)

- Princely Abbey of Corvey (de:complete list) –

- Hermann III von Bömelberg, Prince-abbot (1479–1504)
- Franz von Ketteler, Prince-abbot (1504–1547)
- Kaspar I von Hörsel, Prince-abbot (1547–1555)
- Reiner II von Bocholtz, Prince-abbot (1555–1585)
- Dietrich IV. von Beringhausen, Prince-abbot (1585–1616)

- County of Drenthe (complete list) –

- Georg Schenck van Toutenburg, Stadtholder (1536–1540)
- Maximilian of Egmont, Stadtholder (1540–1548)

For the succeeding rulers, see the County of Drenthe under the #Burgundian-Low Countries

- Essen Abbey (complete list) –

- Meina von Daun-Oberstein, Princess-Abbess (1489–1521)
- Margarete II von Beichlingen, Princess-Abbess (1521–1534)
- Sibylle von Montfort, Princess-Abbess (1534–1551)
- Katharina von Tecklenburg, Princess-Abbess (1551–1560)
- Maria von Spiegelberg, Princess-Abbess (1560–1561)
- Irmgard von Diepholz, Princess-Abbess (1561–1575)
- Elisabeth VI von Manderscheid-Blankenheim-Gerolstein, Princess-Abbess (1575–1578)
- Elisabeth VII von Sayn, Princess-Abbess (1578–1588)
- Elisabeth VIII von Manderscheid-Blankenheim, Princess-Abbess (1588–1598)
- Margarete Elisabeth von Manderscheid-Blankenheim, Princess-Abbess (1598–1604)

- County of East Frisia (complete list) –

- Edzard I the Great, Count (1491–1528)
- Enno II, Count (1528–1540)
- Anna of Oldenburg, Regent (1540–1561)
- Johan II, Count (1561–1591)
- Edzard II, Count (1561–1599)
- Enno III, Count (1599–1625)

- Lordship of Groningen (complete list) –

- Cristoffel van Meurs, Stadtholder (1519–1522)
- Jasper van Marwijck, Stadtholder (1522–1530)
- Charles of Guelders, Stadtholder (1530–1536)
- Ludolf Coenders, Stadtholder (1536–?)
- Georg Schenck van Toutenburg, Stadtholder (1536–1540)
- Maximiliaan van Egmond, Stadtholder (1540–1548)

For the succeeding rulers, see the Lordship of Groningen under the #Burgundian-Low Countries

- Duchy of Guelders (complete list) –

- Charles II, Duke (1492–1538)
- William II, Duke (1538–1543)
- Charles V, Duke (1543–1555)

For the succeeding rulers, see the Duchy of Guelders under the #Burgundian-Low Countries

- Duchy of Guelders (complete list) –

- Guelders independent (1492–1504)
- John V of Nassau-Siegen, Stadtholder (1504–1505)
- Philip of Burgundy, Stadtholder (1505–1507)
- Floris van Egmond, Stadtholder (1507–1511)
- Guelders independent, Stadtholder (1511–1543)
- René of Châlon, Stadtholder (1543–1544)
- Philip de Lalaing, Stadtholder (1544–1555)

For the succeeding rulers, see the Upper Groningen under the #Burgundian-Low Countries

- Upper Guelders (complete list) –

- Reinier of Guelders, Stadtholder (1502–1522)

For the succeeding rulers, see the Upper Groningen under the #Burgundian-Low Countries

- Herford Abbey (complete list) –

- Bonizet of Limburg-Stirum, Abbess (1494–1524)
- Anna II of Limburg, Abbess (1524–1565)
- Margaret II of Lippe, Abbess (1565–1578)
- Felicitas I of Eberstein, Abbess (1578–1586)
- Magdalene I of Lippe, Abbess (1586–1604)

- Prince-Bishopric of Liège (complete list) –

- John of Hornes, Prince-Bishop (1484–1505)
- Érard de La Marck, Prince-Bishop (1505–1538)
- Corneille of Berghes, Prince-Bishop (1538–1544)
- George of Austria, Prince-Bishop (1544–1557)
- Robert of Berghes, Prince-Bishop (1557–1564)
- Gerard van Groesbeeck, Prince-Bishop (1564–1580)
- Ernest of Bavaria, Prince-Bishop (1581–1612)

- Limburg-Broich (complete list) –

- John, Count (1473–1508)

- County of Lippe (complete list) –

- Simon V, Lord (1511–1528), Count (1528–1536)
- Bernhard VIII, Count (1536–1563)
- Simon VI, Count (1563–1613)

- Duchy of Luxemburg

- Dukes (complete list) –

- Philip II, Duke (1482–1506)
- Charles III, Duke (1506–1556)

- Stadtholders (complete list) –

- Philip I de Croÿ, Stadtholder (?–1511)
- Peter Ernst I von Mansfeld-Vorderort, Stadtholder (1545–1552, 1559–1604)
For the succeeding rulers, see the Duchy of Luxemburg under the #Burgundian-Low Countries

- Prince-Bishopric of Münster (complete list) –

- Conrad II of Rietberg, Prince-bishop (1497–1508)
- Eric II of Saxe-Lauenburg, Prince-bishop (1508–1522)
- Frederick III, Prince-bishop (1522–1532)
- Eric of Brunswick-Grubenhagen, Prince-bishop (1532–1532)
- Francis von Waldeck, Prince-bishop (1532–1553)
- William of Ketteler, Prince-bishop (1553–1557)
- Bernhard of Raesfeld, Prince-bishop (1557–1566)
- John II of Hoya, Prince-bishop (1566–1574)
- John William, Prince-bishop (1574–1585)
- Ernest of Bavaria, Prince-bishop (1585–1612)

- County of Oldenburg (complete list) –

- John V, Count (1500–1526)
- John VI, Count (1526–1529)
- George, Count (1526–1529)
- Christopher, Count (1526–1566)
- Anthony I, Count (1526–1573)
- John VII, Count (1573–1603)
- Anthony II, Count of Oldenburg-Delmenhorst, Count (1573–1619)

- Prince-Bishopric of Osnabrück (complete list) –

- Konrad IV. von Rietberg, Prince-bishop (1482–1508)
- Eric of Brunswick-Grubenhagen, Prince-bishop (1508–1532)
- Franz von Waldeck, Prince-bishop (1532–1553)
- Johann IV of Osnabrück, Prince-bishop (1553–1574)
- Henry of Saxe-Lauenburg, Prince-bishop (1574–1585)
- Bernhard von Waldeck, Prince-bishop (1585–1591)
- Philip Sigismund, Prince-bishop (1591–1623)

- Lordship of Overijssel

- Lords –

- Charles II, Count (1528–1555)

under the Pragmatic Sanction of 1549 Charles V united Overijssel with the other lordships of the Low Countries

- Philip III, Count (1555–1581)

- Stadtholders (complete list) –

- Georg Schenck van Toutenburg, Stadtholder (1528–1540)
- Maximiliaan van Egmond, Stadtholder (1540–1548)
For the succeeding rulers, see the Lordship of Overijssel under the #Burgundian-Low Countries

- Prince-Bishopric of Paderborn (complete list) –

- Hermann von Hessen, Prince-bishop (1498–1508)
- Hermann of Wied, Prince-bishop (1532–1547)
- Rembert of Kerssenbrock, Prince-bishop (1547–1568)
- John II, Bishop of Paderborn, Prince-bishop (1568–1574)
- Salentin of Isenburg, Prince-bishop (1574–1577)
- Henry IV of Saxe-Lauenburg, Prince-bishop (1577–1585)
- Dietrich IV, Bishop of Paderborn, Prince-bishop (1585–1618)

- County of Runkel (complete list) –

- John, Count (1460–1521)

- County of Sayn (complete list) –

- Gerard III, co-Count (1493–1506)
- Sebastian I, Count (1493–1598)
- John IV, co-Count (1498–1529)
- John V, co-Count (1529–1560)
- Sebastian II, co-Count (1529–1573)
- Adolph, co-Count (1560–1568)
- Herman, co-Count (1560–1571)
- Henry IV, co-Count (1560–1606)

- Prince-Bishopric of Utrecht (complete list) –

- Frederick IV of Baden, Prince-bishop (1496–1517)
- Philip of Burgundy (1517–1524)
- Henry of the Palatinate, Prince-bishop (1524–1528)

- Lordship of Utrecht

- Lords –

- Charles II, Count (1528–1555)

under the Pragmatic Sanction of 1549 Charles V united Utrecht with the other lordships of the Low Countries

- Philip III, Count (1555–1581)

- Stadtholders (complete list) –

- Antoon I van Lalaing, Stadtholder (1528–1540)
- René of Châlon, Stadtholder (1540–1544)
- Louis of Flanders, Stadtholder (1544–1546)
- Maximilian of Burgundy, Stadtholder (1547–1558)
For the succeeding rulers, see the Lordship of Utrecht under the #Burgundian-Low Countries

- Prince-Bishopric of Verden (complete list) –

- Christopher the Spendthrift, Prince-Bishop (1502–1558)
- George of Brunswick and Lunenburg (Wolfenbüttel), Prince-Bishop (1558–1566)
- Eberhard of Holle, Prince-Bishop (1566–1586)
- Philip Sigismund of Brunswick and Lunenburg (Wolfenbüttel), Prince-Bishop (1586–1623)

- County of Wied (complete list) –

- William III, Count (1487–1526)
- John I, Count (1487–1533)
- Philip, Count (1533–1535)
- John II, Count (1535–1581)
- Herman I, Count (1581–1591)
- William IV, Count (1581–1612)
- Herman II, Count (1581–1631)

- County of Wied (complete list) –

- William III, Count (1487–1526)
- John I, Count (1526–1533)
- Philip, Count (1533–1535)
- John II, Count (1535–1581)
- Herman I, co-Count (1581–1591)
- William IV, co-Count (1581–1612)
- Herman II, Count (1581–1631)

== Upper Rhenish ==
- Duchy of Bar (complete list) –

- René II, Duke (1483–1508)

- Prince-Bishopric of Basel (complete list) –

- Caspar von Mühlhausen, Prince-bishop (1479–1502)
- Christoph von Utenheim, Prince-bishop (1502–1527)
- Philippe von Gundelsheim, Prince-bishop (1527–1533)
- Melchior von Lichtenfels, Prince-bishop (1554–1575)
- Jakob Christoph Blarer von Wartensee, Prince-bishop (1575–1608)

- Free City of Frankfurt (de:complete list) –

- Johann von Martorf, Senior Mayor (1599–1600)
- Johann Ludwig von Glauburg, Senior Mayor (1600–1601)

- Princely Abbey of Fulda (complete list) –

- Johann II of Henneberg-Schleusingen, Prince-abbot (1472–1513)
- Hartmann II. Burggraf von Kirchberg, Prince-abbot (1513–1521/29)
- Johann III. Graf von Henneberg-Schleusingen, Prince-abbot (1521/29–1541)
- Philipp Schenk zu Schweinsberg, Prince-abbot (1541–1550)
- Wolfgang Dietrich von Eusigheim, Prince-abbot (1550–1558)
- Wolfgang Schutzbar (named Milchling), Prince-abbot (1558–1567)
- Philipp Georg Schenk zu Schweinsberg, Prince-abbot (1567–1568)
- Wilhelm Hartmann von Klauer zu Wohra, Prince-abbot (1568–1570)
- Balthasar von Dernbach, Prince-abbot (1570–1606, but exiled 1576–1602)
- Julius Echter von Mespelbrunn, Administrator (1576–1602)

- Landgraviate of Hesse (complete list) –

- William III the Middle, Landgrave of Lower Hesse (1493–1500), of Hesse (1500–1509)
- Philip I the Magnanimous, Landgrave (1509–1567)

- Landgraviate of Hesse-Darmstadt (complete list) –

- George I the Pious, Landgrave (1567–1596)
- Louis VI the Faithful, Landgrave (1596–1626)

- Landgraviate of Hesse-Kassel (complete list) –

- William IV the Wise, Landgrave (1567–1592)
- Maurice I the Learned, Landgrave (1592–1627)

- Landgraviate of Hesse-Marburg –

- Louis IV the Elder, Landgrave (1567–1604)

- Landgraviate of Hesse-Rheinfels (complete list) –

- Philip II the Younger, Landgrave (1567–1583)

- Isenburg-Büdingen (complete list) –

- Wolfgang Ernst I. von Isenburg-Büdingen, Count (1596–1633)

- Isenburg-Grenzau (complete list) –

- Gerlach III, Count (1502–1530)
- Henry the Elder, Count (1530–1552)
- Anthony, Count (1552–1554)
- John, Count (1554–1556)
- Arnold, Count (1556–1577)
- Salentin VII, Count (1577–1610)

- Isenburg-Neumagen (complete list) –

- Salentin VI, Count (1502–1534)
- Henry, Count (1534–1554)

- Leiningen-Westerburg (complete list: de) –

- Reinhard I, Count (?–1522)
- Kuno II, Count (1522–1547)

- Westerburg-Leiningen-Westerburg (de:complete list) –

- Reinhard II, Count (1547–1584)
- Albrecht Philipp, Count (1584–1597)
- Johann Ludwig, Count (1597)

- Westerburg-Leiningen-Leiningen (complete list: de) –

- Philipp I, Count (1547–1597)
- Louis, Count (1597–1622)

- Leiningen-Schaumburg (de:complete list) –

- George I, Count (1547–1586)
- Philipp Jacob, Count (1586–1612)

- Leiningen-Hardenburg (de:complete list) –

- Emich VIII, Count (1495–1535)
- Emich IX, Count (1535–1541)
- Johann Philipp I, Count (1539–1562)
- Emich XII, Count (1562–1607)

- Duchy of Lorraine (complete list) –

- René II, Duke (1473–1508)
- Antoine, Duke (1508–1544)
- Francis I, Duke (1544–1545)
- Charles III, Duke (1545–1608)

- County of Nassau-Beilstein –

- John II, Count (1499–1513)
- Henry V, co-Count (1513–1525)
- John III, Count (1513–1561)

- Nassau-Saarbrückeng (complete list) –

- John Louis, Count (1472–1545)
- Philip II, Count (1545–1554)
- John III, Count (1554–1574)
- Philip IV, Count (1574–1602)

- Nassau-Weilburg (complete list) –

- Louis I, Count (1492–1523)
- Philip III, Count (1523–1559)
- Albrecht, Count (1559–1593)
- Philip IV, Count (1559–1602)

- Lower Salm (complete list) –

- Peter, Count (1479–1505)
- John III, Count (1505–1537)
- John IV, Count (1537–1559)
- Werner, Count (1559–1629)

- Salm-Badenweiler (complete list) –

- John VI, Count (1451–1505)
- John VII, Count (1505–1548)
- John VIII, Count (1548–1600)

- Salm-Blankenburg (complete list) –

- Louis, Count (1443–1503)
- Ulrick, Count (1503–1506)

- Solms-Braunfels (complete list) –

- Otto II, Count (1459–1504)
- Bernhard III, Count (1504–1547)
- Philipp, Count (1547–1581)
- Konrad, Count (1581–1592)
- Johann Albrecht I, Count (1592–1623)

- Salm-Dhaun (complete list) –

- Philip, Rhinegrave (1499–1521)
- Philip Francis, Rhinegrave (1521–1561)
- John Philip I, Rhinegrave (1561–1569)
- Frederick, Rhinegrave (1569–1574)
- Adolf Henry, Rhinegrave (1574–1606)

- Salm-Neuweiler (complete list) –

- Frederick I, Rhinegrave (1561–1610)

- Salm-Salm (complete list) –

- Friedrich I, Count (1574–1608)

- Prince-Bishopric of Sion (complete list) –

- Mathieu Schiner, Prince-Bishop (1499–1522)
- Philippe am Hengart, Prince-Bishop (1522–1528)
- Adrien I of Riedmatten, Prince-Bishop (1529–1545)
- Jean Jordan, Prince-Bishop (1548–1565)
- Hildebrand I of Riedmatten, Prince-Bishop (1565–1604)

- Prince-Bishopric of Speyer (complete list) –

- Ludwig of Helmstädt, Prince-bishop (1478–1504)
- Philip I of Rosenberg, Prince-bishop (1504–1513)
- George, Count Palatine by Rhine, Prince-bishop (1513–1529)
- Philip II of Flersheim, Prince-bishop (1529–1552)
- Rudolf of Frankenstein, Prince-bishop (1552–1560)
- Marquard Freiherr of Hattstein, Prince-bishop (1560–1581)
- Eberhard of Dienheim, Prince-bishop (1581–1610)

- Prince-Bishopric of Strasbourg (complete list) –

- Albrecht von Pfalz-Mosbach, Prince-Bishop (1478–1506)
- Wilhelm III von Hohnstein, Prince-Bishop (1506–1541)
- Erasmus Schenk von Limburg, Prince-Bishop (1541–1568)
- Johann IV von Manderscheid, Prince-Bishop (1568–1592)
- Johann Georg von Brandenburg, Prince-Bishop (1592–1604)

- County of Waldeck-Landau, Newer Line –

- John I, Count (1539–1567)
- Philip VI, Count (1567–1579)
- Francis III, Count (1579–1597)

- County of Waldeck-Eisenberg –

- Philip II, Regent (1475–1486), Count (1486–1524)
- Philip III, Count (1524–1539)
- Wolrad II, Count (1539–1578)
- Josias I, Count (1578–1588)
- Christian, Count of Waldeck-Eisenberg (1588–1607), of Waldeck-Wildungen (1607–1637)
- Wolrad IV, Count (1588–1640)

- County of Waldeck-Wildungen, Older Line –

- Henry VIII, Count of Waldeck-Waldeck (1475–1486), of Waldeck-Wildungen (1486–1512)
- Philipp IV, Count (1513–1574)
- Daniel, Count (1574–1577)
- Henry IX, Count (1577)
- Günther, Count (1577–1585)
- Wilhelm Ernst, Count (1585–1598)

- Prince-Bishopric of Worms (complete list) –

- Johann von Dalberg, Prince-bishop (1482–1503)
- Reinhard von Rüppurr, Prince-bishop (1503–1523)
- Henry of the Palatinate, Prince-bishop (1523–1552)
- Dietrich von Rothenstein, Prince-bishop (1552–1580)
- Georg von Schönenberg, Prince-bishop (1580–1595)
- Philipp von Rothenstein, Prince-bishop (1595–1604)

== Lower Saxon ==
- Duchy/ Electorate of Saxony, Albertine (complete list) –

- George I the Bearded, Duke (1500–1539)
- Henry IV the Pious, Duke (1539–1541)
- Maurice I, Duke (1541–1547), Elector (1547–1553)
- Augustus, Elector of Saxony (1553–1586), Regent of Saxe-Weimar (1573–1586), Regent of Saxe-Coburg-Eisenach (1572–1586)
- Christian I, Elector (1586–1591)
- Sophie of Brandenburg, Regent (1591–c.1601)
- Christian II, Elector (1591–1611), Regent of Saxe-Altenburg (1603–1611)

- Saxe-Lauenburg (complete list) –

- John V, co-Duke (1439–1507)
- Magnus I, Duke (1507–1543)
- Francis I, Duke (1543–1571, 1573/74–1581)
- Magnus II, Duke (1571–1573/74)
- Augustus, co-Vicegerent (1578–1581), co-Administrator (1581–1586), co-Duke (1586–1612)
- Francis II, co-Vicegerent (1578–1581), co-Administrator (1581–1586), co-Duke (1586–1619)

- Prince-Archbishopric of Bremen (complete list) –

- John III, Prince-archbishop (1497–1511)
- Christopher the Spendthrift, Prince-archbishop (1511–1542/1547, 1549–1558)
- George of Brunswick and Lunenburg (Wolfenbüttel line), Prince-archbishop (1558–1566)
- Henry III, Prince-archbishop (1568–1585)
- John Adolphus of Schleswig-Holstein-Gottorp, Prince-archbishop (1589–1596)
- John Frederick, Prince-archbishop (1596–1634)

- Principality of Brunswick-Wolfenbüttel/ Principality of Wolfenbüttel (complete list) –

- Henry the Elder, Prince of Brunswick-Wolfenbüttel (1491–1514), co-Prince of Calenberg (1491–1494)
- Henry V the Younger, Prince (1514–1568)
- Julius, Prince of Brunswick-Wolfenbüttel (1568–1589), of Calenberg (1584–1589)
- Henry Julius, Prince of Wolfenbüttel, of Calenberg (1589–1613), of Grubenhagen (1596–1613)

- Principality of Calenberg (complete list) –

- Eric I, co-Prince of Brunswick-Wolfenbüttel (1491–1494), Prince of Calenberg (1491–1540)
- Eric II, Prince (1545–1584)
- Julius, Prince of Brunswick-Wolfenbüttel (1568–1589), of Calenberg (1584–1589)
- Henry Julius, Prince of Wolfenbüttel, of Calenberg (1589–1613), of Grubenhagen (1596–1613)

- Gandersheim Abbey (complete list) –

- Agnes III, Princess-Abbess (1485–1504)
- Gertrud, Princess-Abbess (1504–1531)
- Katharina, rival abbess (1504–1536)
- Maria, Princess-Abbess (1532–1539)
- Clara of Brunswick-Wolfenbüttel, Princess-Abbess (1539–1547)
- Magdalena of Chlum, Princess-Abbess (1547–1577, 1577–1589)
- Elisabeth, rival abbess (1577–1582)
- Margarete of Warberg, rival abbess (1582–1587)
- Anna Erica, Princess-Abbess (1589–1611)

- Duchy of Gifhorn (complete list) –

- Francis, co-Prince of Lüneburg (1536–1539), Prince of Gifhorn (1539–1549)

- Principality of Grubenhagen (complete list) –

- Henry IV, Prince (1479–1526)
- Philip I, Prince (1486–1551)
- Ernest III, Prince (1551–1567)
- Wolfgang, Prince (1567–1595)
- Philip II, Prince (1595–1596)

annexed by Brunswick-Wolfenbüttel

- Free City of Hamburg (complete list) –

- Johann Spreckelsen, Mayor (1512)
- Nicolaus Thode, Mayor (1517)
- Thidericus Hohusen, Mayor (1517)
- Mayorship unoccupied (1519–1520), Dietrich Hohusen, Second Mayor (1517–1546)
- Erhard vom Holte, Mayor (1520–1529)
- Hinrich Salsborg, Mayor (1523)
- Johann Hülpe, Mayor (1524)
- Johann Wetken, Mayor (1529–1533)
- Paul Grote, Mayor (1531)
- Albert Westede, Mayor (1533–1538)
- Johann Rodenborg, Mayor (1536)
- Peter von Spreckelsen, Mayor (1538–1553)
- Jürgen Plate, Mayor (1546)
- Matthias Rheder, Mayor (1547)
- Ditmar Koel, Mayor (1548)
- Albert Hackmann, Mayor (1553–1580)
- Mayorship unoccupied (1580–1581), Paul Grote, Second Mayor (1580–1584)
- Lorenz Niebur, Mayor (1557)
- Hermann Wetken, Mayor (1564)
- Eberhard Moller, Mayor (1571)
- Paul Grote, Mayor (1580)
- Johann Niebur, Mayor (1557)
- Nicolaus Vögeler, Mayor (1581)
- Joachim vom Kape, Mayor (1588)
- Diedrich von Eitzen, Mayor (1589)
- Mayorship unoccupied (1590–1591), Joachim von Kape, Second Mayor (1588–1594)
- Erich von der Fechte, Mayor (1591–1613)
- Joachim Bekendorp, Mayor (1593)
- Diederich vom Holte, Mayor (1595)
- Vincent Moller, Mayor (1599)

- Prince-Bishopric of Hildesheim (complete list) –

- Berthold II of Landsberg, Prince-bishop (1481–1502)
- Eric II of Saxe-Lauenburg, Prince-bishop (1503–1504)
- John IV of Saxe-Lauenburg, Prince-bishop (1504–1527)
- Balthasar Merklin, Prince-bishop (1527–1531)
- Otto IV of Schaumburg, Prince-bishop (1531–1537)
- Valentin von Teutleben, Prince-bishop (1537–1551)
- Frederick of Denmark, Prince-bishop (1551–1556)
- Burchard von Oberg, Prince-bishop (1557–1573)
- Ernest II of Bavaria, Prince-bishop (1573–1612)

- Duchy of Holstein

- Dukes (complete list) –

- John, Duke (1481–1513)
- Christian II, Duke (1513–1523)
- Frederick I, Duke (1523–1533)
- Olav Engelbrektsson, Regent (1533–1537)
- Christian III, Duke of Holstein (1533–1544), Duke of Holstein-Glückstadt (1544–1559)

- Statholders (complete list) –

- Johan Rantzau, Statholder (1523/45–1550)
- Bertram von Ahlefeldt, Statholder (1550–1556)
- Heinrich Rantzau, Statholder (1556–1598)

- Schleswig-Holstein-Haderslev –

- John II, Duke (1544–1580)

- Holstein-Glückstadt

- Dukes (complete list) –

- Christian III, Duke of Holstein (1533–1544), Duke of Holstein-Glückstadt (1544–1559)
- Frederick II, Duke (1559–1588)
- Christian IV, Duke (1588–1648)

- Statholders (complete list) –

- Heinrich Rantzau, Statholder (1556–1598)
- Geerd Rantzau, Statholder (1600–1627)

- Holstein-Gottorp (complete list) –

- Adolf, Duke (1544–1586)
- Frederick II, Duke (1586–1587)
- Philip, Duke (1587–1590)
- John Adolf, Duke (1590–1616)

- Holstein-Pinneberg (Holstein-Schaumburg) (complete list) –

- Otto III, Count (1492–1510)
- Antonius, Count (1510–1526)
- Johann IV, Count (1526–1527)
- Jobst I, Count (1527–1531)
- Adolph XIII, Count (1531–1544)
- Jobst II, Count (1531–1581)
- Otto IV, Count (1544–1576)
- Adolf XI, Count (1576–1601)

- Prince-bishopric of Lübeck (complete list) –

- Theodoric II, Prince-bishop (1492–1506)
- Wilhem Westphal, Prince-bishop (1506–1509)
- John VIII, Prince-bishop (1510–1523)
- Henry III, Prince-bishop (1523–1535)
- Detlev von Reventlow, Prince-bishop (1535–1535)
- Balthasar Rantzau, Prince-bishop (1536–1547)
- Jodokus Hodfilter, Prince-bishop (1547–1551)
- Theodoric III, Prince-bishop (1551–1554)
- sede vacante, Prince-bishop (1554–1556)
- Andreas von Barby, Prince-bishop (1556–1559)
- John IX, Prince-bishop (1559–1561)
- Eberhard II, Prince-bishop (1561–1586)
- John Adolf, Duke of Holstein-Gottorp, Prince-bishop (1586–1607)

- Free City of Lübeck (complete list) –

- Ludeke von Thünen, Mayor (1475–1501)
- Heinrich Brömse, Mayor (1487–1502)
- Hermann von Wickede II, Mayor (1489–1501)
- Johann Hertze († 1510), Mayor (1498–1510)
- Hartwig von Stiten († 1511), Mayor (1502–1511)
- Tideman Berck, Mayor (1501–1521)
- Heinrich Witte (Bürgermeister), Mayor (1513–1520)
- David Divessen (Bürgermeister), Mayor (1503–1509)
- Heinrich Castorp, Mayor (1512)
- Hermann Meyer (Bürgermeister), Mayor (1510–1528)
- Thomas von Wickede (1470–1527), Mayor (1511–1527)
- Hermann Falcke, Mayor (1522–1530)
- Nikolaus Brömse, Mayor (1520–1531; 1535–1543)
- Joachim Gercken, Mayor (1531–1544)
- Mattheus Packebusch, Mayor (1528–1532; 1534–1537)
- Hermann Plönnies, Mayor (1529–1531)
- Gotthard III. von Hoeveln, Mayor (1531–1552)
- Nikolaus Bardewik, Mayor (1544–1560)
- Anton von Stiten, Mayor (1540–1564)
- Gottschalck Lunte, Mayor (1531–1532)
- Jürgen Wullenwever, Mayor (1533–1535)
- Ludwig Taschenmaker, Mayor (1533–1535)
- Eberhard Störtelberg, Mayor (1545–1549)
- Paul Wibbeking, Mayor (1560)
- Ambrosius Meyer, Mayor (1551)
- Bartholomeus Tinnappel, Mayor (1564)
- Hermann Falke, Mayor (1553)
- Christoph Tode, Mayor (1560–1566)
- Anton Lüdinghusen, Mayor (1562)
- Hieronymus Lüneburg, Mayor (1561)
- Heinrich Plönnies, Mayor (1572)
- Johann Brokes, Mayor (1573)
- Dietrich von Broemse, Mayor (1588)
- Hermann von Dorne, Mayor (1579–1594)
- Hermann von Vechtelde, Mayor (1571–1572)
- Johann Lüdinghusen, Mayor (1580–1589)
- Joachim Lüneburg, Mayor (1581)
- Gotthard V. von Hoeveln, Mayor (1589)
- Arnold Bonnus, Mayor (1594)
- Hermann Warmboeke, Mayor (1589)
- Alexander Lüneburg, Mayor (1599)
- Jakob Bording, Mayor (1600–1616)

- Principality of Lüneburg (complete list) –

- Henry the Middle, Prince (1486–1520)
- Otto of Harburg, co-Prince (1520–1527)
- Ernest I the Confessor, co-Prince (1520–1527), Prince (1520–1546)
- Francis, co-Prince of Lüneburg (1536–1539), Prince of Gifhorn (1539–1549)
- Francis Otto, Prince (1555–1559)
- Henry of Dannenberg, Prince (1559–1598)
- William the Younger, Prince (1559–1592)
- Ernest II, Prince (1592–1611)

- Prince-Archbishopric of Magdeburg and of Halberstadt (complete list) –

- Ernest II of Saxony, Prince-archbishop of Magdeburg (1475–1513), Administor of Halberstadt (1480–1513)
- Albert IV of Brandenburg, Prince-archbishop, Administor (1513–1545)
- John Albert of Brandenburg-Ansbach, Prince-archbishop, Administor (1545–1551)
- Frederick IV of Brandenburg, Prince-archbishop, Administor (1551–1552)
- Sigismund of Brandenburg, Prince-archbishop, Administor (1552–1566)
- Joachim Frederick, Prince-archbishop (1566–1598)
- Christian William of Brandenburg, Prince-archbishop (1598–1631)

- Mecklenburg (complete list) –

- Magnus II, co-Duke of Mecklenburg (1477–1479), of Mecklenburg-Schwerin (1479–1483), of Mecklenburg (1483–1503)
- Balthasar, co-Duke of Mecklenburg-Schwerin (1479–1483), of Mecklenburg (1483–1507)
- Eric II, co-Duke (1503–1508)
- Albrecht VII the Handsome, co-Duke of Mecklenburg (1503–1520), Duke of Mecklenburg-Güstrow (1520–1547)
- Henry V the Peaceful, co-Duke of Mecklenburg (1503–1520), Duke of Mecklenburg-Schwerin (1520–1552)

- Duchy of Mecklenburg-Güstrow (complete list) –

- Albrecht VII the Handsome, co-Duke of Mecklenburg (1503–1520), Duke of Mecklenburg-Güstrow (1520–1547)
- John Albert I, Duke of Mecklenburg-Güstrow (1547–1552), Duke of Mecklenburg-Schwerin (1556–1576)
- Ulrich I, Duke (1555–1603)

- Duchy of Mecklenburg-Schwerin (complete list) –

- Henry V the Peaceful, co-Duke of Mecklenburg (1503–1520), Duke of Mecklenburg-Schwerin (1520–1552)
- Philip I, Duke (1552–1557)
- John Albert I, Duke of Mecklenburg-Güstrow (1547–1552), Duke of Mecklenburg-Schwerin (1556–1576)
- Johann VII, Duke (1576–1592)
- John Albert II, co-Duke of Mecklenburg-Schwerin (1592–1621), -Güstrow (1610–1621), Duke of Mecklenburg-Güstrow (1621–1628, 1631–1636)
- Adolf Frederick I, co-Duke of Mecklenburg-Schwerin (1592–1621), -Güstrow (1610–1621), Duke of Mecklenburg-Schwerin (1621–1628, 1631–1658)

- County of Oldenburg (complete list) –

- John V, Count (1500–1526)
- John VI, Count (1526–1529)
- George, Count (1526–1529)
- Christopher, Count (1526–1566)
- Anthony I, Count (1526–1573)
- John VII, Count (1573–1603)
- Anthony II, Count (1573–1619)

== Upper Saxon ==
- Electorate/ Duchy of Saxony, Ernestine (complete list) –

- Frederick III the Wise, Elector (1486–1525)
- John I the Steadfast, Elector (1525–1532)
- John Frederick I, Elector (1532–1547), Duke (1547–1554)
- John Frederick II, Duke (1554–1566)
- Johann Wilhelm, Duke of Saxony (1566–1572), of Saxe-Weimar (1572–1573)

- Saxe-Weimar (complete list) –

- Johann Wilhelm, Duke of Saxony (1566–1572), of Saxe-Weimar (1572–1573)
- Augustus, Elector of Saxony (1553–1586), Regent of Saxe-Weimar (1573–1586), Regent of Saxe-Coburg-Eisenach (1572–1586)
- Friedrich Wilhelm I, Duke (1573–1602)

- Saxe-Coburg-Eisenach (complete list) –

- Augustus, Elector of Saxony (1553–1586), Regent of Saxe-Weimar (1573–1586), Regent of Saxe-Coburg-Eisenach (1572–1586)
- John Casimir, co-Duke of Saxe-Coburg-Eisenach (1572–1596), Duke of Saxe-Coburg (1596–1633)
- John Ernest I, co-Duke of Saxe-Coburg-Eisenach (1572–1596), Duke of Saxe-Eisenach (1596–1633), of Saxe-Coburg-Eisenach (1633–1638)

- Saxe-Eisenach (complete list) –

- John Ernest I, co-Duke of Saxe-Coburg-Eisenach (1572–1596), Duke of Saxe-Eisenach (1596–1633), of Saxe-Coburg-Eisenach (1633–1638)

- Saxe-Coburg (complete list) –

- John Casimir, co-Duke of Saxe-Coburg-Eisenach (1572–1596), Duke of Saxe-Coburg (1596–1633)

- Anhalt-Dessau (complete list) –

- George II the Strong, co-Prince (1474–1509)
- Rudolph I the Valiant, co-Prince (1474–1510)
- Ernest I, co-Prince (1474–1516)
- Margaret of Münsterberg, Regent (1516–1524)
- Joachim I, co-Prince (1516–1544), Prince (1544–1561)
- John IV, co-Prince of Anhalt-Dessau (1524–1544), of Anhalt-Zerbst (1544–1551)
- George III, co-Prince of Anhalt-Dessau (1524–1544), of Anhalt-Plötzkau (1544–1553)
- Karl I, co-Prince of Anhalt-Zerbst (1551–1561), of Anhalt-Plötzkau (1553–1561)
- Bernhard VII, co-Prince of Anhalt-Zerbst (1551–1570), of Anhalt-Plötzkau (1553–1570), of Anhalt-Dessau (1561–1570), of Anhalt-Köthen (1562–1570)
- Joachim Ernest, co-Prince of Anhalt-Zerbst (1551–1570), of Anhalt-Plötzkau (1553–1570), of Anhalt-Dessau (1561–1570), of Anhalt-Köthen(1562–1570), Prince of Anhalt (1570–1586)

- Anhalt-Köthen (complete list) –

- Waldemar VI, co-Prince (1471–1508)
- Adolph II, co-Prince (1475–1508)
- Magnus, co-Prince (1475–1508), Prince (1475–1508)
- Wolfgang the Confessor, Prince (1508–1562)
- Joachim Ernest, co-Prince of Anhalt-Zerbst (1551–1570), of Anhalt-Plötzkau (1553–1570), of Anhalt-Dessau (1561–1570), of Anhalt-Köthen(1562–1570), Prince of Anhalt (1570–1586)

- Anhalt-Plötzkau (complete list) –

- George III, co-Prince of Anhalt-Dessau (1524–1544), of Anhalt-Plötzkau (1544–1553)
- Karl I, co-Prince of Anhalt-Zerbst (1551–1561), of Anhalt-Plötzkau (1553–1561)
- Bernhard VII, co-Prince of Anhalt-Zerbst (1551–1570), of Anhalt-Plötzkau (1553–1570), of Anhalt-Dessau (1561–1570), of Anhalt-Köthen (1562–1570)
- Joachim Ernest, co-Prince of Anhalt-Zerbst (1551–1570), of Anhalt-Plötzkau (1553–1570), of Anhalt-Dessau (1561–1570), of Anhalt-Köthen(1562–1570), Prince of Anhalt (1570–1586)

- Anhalt-Zerbst (complete list) –

- John IV, co-Prince of Anhalt-Dessau (1524–1544), of Anhalt-Zerbst (1544–1551)
- Karl I, co-Prince of Anhalt-Zerbst (1551–1561), of Anhalt-Plötzkau (1553–1561)
- Bernhard VII, co-Prince of Anhalt-Zerbst (1551–1570), of Anhalt-Plötzkau (1553–1570), of Anhalt-Dessau (1561–1570), of Anhalt-Köthen (1562–1570)
- Joachim Ernest, co-Prince of Anhalt-Zerbst (1551–1570), of Anhalt-Plötzkau (1553–1570), of Anhalt-Dessau (1561–1570), of Anhalt-Köthen(1562–1570), Prince of Anhalt (1570–1586)

- Principality of Anhalt (complete list) –

- Joachim Ernest, co-Prince of Anhalt-Zerbst (1551–1570), of Anhalt-Plötzkau (1553–1570), of Anhalt-Dessau (1561–1570), of Anhalt-Köthen(1562–1570), Prince of Anhalt (1570–1586)
- Bernhard von Anhalt, co-Prince of Anhalt (1586–1596)
- John Ernest, co-Prince of Anhalt (1586–1601)
- John George I, co-Prince of Anhalt (1586–1603), of Anhalt-Dessau (1603–1618)
- Rudolph II, co-Prince of Anhalt (1586–1603), of Anhalt-Zerbst (1603–1621)
- Christian I, co-Prince of Anhalt (1586–1603), of Anhalt-Bernburg (1603–1630)
- Louis I, co-Prince of Anhalt (1586–1603), of Anhalt-Köthen (1603–1650)
- Augustus, co-Prince of Anhalt (1586–1603), of Anhalt-Plötzkau (1603–1653), Regent of Anhalt-Zerbst (1621–1642), of Anhalt-Köthen (1650–1653)

- Electorate of Brandenburg (complete list) –

- Joachim I Nestor, Elector (1499–1535)
- Joachim II Hector, Elector (1535–1571)
- John George, Elector (1571–1598)
- Joachim Frederick, Elector (1598–1608)

- Brandenburg-Küstrin –

- John VIII, Margrave (1535–1571)

- Duchy of Pomerania, Pomerania-Wolgast, Pomerania-Barth (complete list) –

- Bogislaw X the Great, Duke of Pomerania-Wolgast and Pomerania-Stettin (1474–1478), of Pomerania (1478–1523)
- George I, co-Duke of Pomerania (1523–1531)
- Barnim IX the Pious, co-Duke of Pomerania (1523–1532), Duke of Pomerania-Stettin (1532–1569)
- Philip I the Pious, co-Duke of Pomerania (1531–1532), Duke of Pomerania-Wolgast (1532–1560)
- Ernst Ludwig the Fair, co-Duke of Pomerania-Wolgast (1560–1569), Duke of Pomerania-Wolgast (1569–1592)
- John Frederick the Strong, co-Duke of Pomerania-Wolgast (1560–1569), co-Duke of Pomerania-Stettin (1569–1600)
- Barnim X the Younger, co-Duke of Pomerania-Wolgast (1560–1569), Duke of Pomerania-Rügenwalde (1569–1603), of Pomerania-Stettin (1600–1603)
- Bogislaw XIII, co-Duke of Pomerania-Wolgast (1560–1569), co-Duke of Pomerania-Barth (1569–1603), of Pomerania-Stettin (1603–1606)
- Philip Julius, Duke of Pomerania-Wolgast (1592–1625)

- Pomerania-Stettin, Pomerania-Rügenwalde (complete list) –

- Barnim IX the Pious, co-Duke of Pomerania (1523–1532), Duke of Pomerania-Stettin (1532–1569)
- John Frederick the Strong, co-Duke of Pomerania-Wolgast (1560–1569), co-Duke of Pomerania-Stettin (1569–1600)
- Barnim X the Younger, co-Duke of Pomerania-Wolgast (1560–1569), Duke of Pomerania-Rügenwalde (1569–1603), of Pomerania-Stettin (1600–1603)

- Schwarzburg-Rudolstadt (complete list) –

- Albrecht VII, Count (1574–1605)

- Schwarzburg-Sondershausen (complete list) –

- John Günther I, Count (1552–1586)
- John Günther II, co-Count (1586–1631)
- Anton Henry, co-Count (1586–1638)
- Christian Günther I, co-Count (1586–1642)
- Günther XLII, co-Count (1586–1643)

- County of Stolberg (de:complete list) –

- Heinrich IX zu Stolberg, Count (1436–1511)
- Botho zu Stolberg, Count (1467–1538)
- Wolfgang zu Stolberg, Count (1501–1552)
- Ludwig zu Stolberg, Count (1505–1574)
- Johann zu Stolberg, Count (1549–1612)
- Heinrich XI. zu Stolberg-Stolberg, Count (1551–1615)
- Wolfgang Georg zu Stolberg-Stolberg, Count (1582–1631)
- Johann Martin, Count (1594–1669)

- Landgraviate of Thuringia (complete list) –

- Frederick VI, Landgrave (1486–1525)
- John, Landgrave (1525–1532)
- John Frederick I, Landgrave (1532–1547)
- John Ernest, Landgrave (1542–1553)
- John Frederick II, Landgrave (1554–1566)
- John William, Landgrave (1554–1572)

== Swabian ==
- Prince-Bishopric of Augsburg (complete list) –

- Friedrich von Hohenzollern, Prince-bishop (1486–1505)
- Heinrich von Lichtenau, Prince-bishop (1505–1517)
- Christoph von Stadion, Prince-bishop (1517–1543)
- Otto Truchsess von Waldburg, Prince-bishop (1543–1573)
- Johann Eglof von Knöringen, Prince-bishop (1573–1575)
- Marquard von Berg, Prince-bishop (1575–1591)
- Johann Otto von Gemmingen, Prince-bishop (1591–1598)
- Heinrich von Knöringen, Prince-bishop (1599–1646)

- Margraviate of Baden-Sausenberg (complete list) –

- Philip I, Margrave (1487–1503)

then inherited by Christoph I to unite Baden

- Margraviate of Baden/ Margraviate of Baden-Baden (complete list) –

- Christopher I, Margrave of Baden-Baden (1475–1503), of Baden (1503–1515)
- Philip I, Margrave of Baden (1515–1533)
- Bernard III, co-Margrave of Baden (1515–1533), Margrave of Baden-Baden (1533–1536)
- Ernest I, co-Margrave of Baden (1515–1533), Margrave of Baden-Durlach (1533–1553)
- Franziska of Luxembourg-Ligny, Regent? (1536–1554)
- Philibert I, Margrave (1554–1569)
- Albert V, Duke of Bavaria, Regent (1569–c.1577)
- Philip III, Margrave (1569–1588)
- Edward Fortunatus, Margrave of Baden-Rodemachern (1575–1588), Margrave of Baden-Baden (1588–1596)
- Ernest Frederick, Margrave of Baden-Durlach (1577–1604), of Baden-Baden (1594–1604), Regent of Baden-Hachberg (1590–1591)

- Margraviate of Baden-Durlach (or Baden-Pforzheim) (complete list) –

- Ernest I, co-Margrave of Baden (1515–1533), Margrave of Baden-Durlach (1533–1553)
- Bernard IV, Margrave (1552–1553)
- Charles II, Margrave (1553–1577)
- Louis VI, Elector Palatine, Regent (1577–1583)
- Anna of Veldenz, Regent (1577–1584)
- Louis III, Duke of Württemberg, Regents (1577–1584)
- Ernest Frederick, Margrave of Baden-Durlach (1577–1604), of Baden-Baden (1594–1604), Regent of Baden-Hachberg (1590–1591)

- Margraviate of Baden-Hachberg (complete list) –

- James III, Margrave (1577–1590)
- Ernest Frederick, Margrave of Baden-Durlach (1577–1604), of Baden-Baden (1594–1604), Regent of Baden-Hachberg (1590–1591)
- Ernest James, Margrave (1590–1591)

- Margraviate of Baden-Rodemachern (complete list) –

- Christopher II, Margrave (1556–1575)
- Edward Fortunatus, Margrave of Baden-Rodemachern (1575–1588), Margrave of Baden-Baden (1588–1596)
- Philip IV, Margrave (1588–1620)

- Prince-Bishopric of Constance (complete list) –

- Hugo von Hohenlandenberg, Prince-bishop (1496–1529; 1531/2)
- Balthasar Merklin, Prince-bishop (1530–1531)
- Johann von Lupfen, Prince-bishop (1532–1537)
- Johan Weze, Prince-bishop (1537–1548)
- Christoph Metzler, Prince-bishop (1549–1561)
- Mark Sittich von Hohenems Altemps, Prince-bishop (1561–1589)
- Margrave Andrew of Burgau, Prince-bishop (1589–1600)

- Prince-Provostry of Ellwangen (complete list) –

- Albrecht V of Rechberg, Prince-provost (1461–1502)
- Bernhard of Westerstetten, Prince-provost (1502–1503)
- Albrecht VI Thumb of Neuburg, Prince-provost (1503–1521)
- Henry of the Palatinate, Prince-provost (1551–1552)
- Otto Truchsess von Waldburg, Prince-provost (1553–1573)
- Christoph of Freyberg-Eisenberg, Prince-provost (1573–1584)
- Wolfgang of Hausen, Prince-provost (1584–1603)

- Fürstenberg-Baar (complete list) –

- Wolfgang, Count (1499–1509)
- Frederick III, Count (1509–1559)

- Gutenzell Abbey (de:complete list) –

- Walburga Gräter, Princess-abbess (c.1478–1503)
- Walburga Bugglin, Princess-abbess (fl.1504)
- Katharina Becht, Princess-abbess (fl.1516 1526)
- Barbara von Stotzingen, Princess-abbess (fl.1526–1527)
- Magdalena von Freyberg, Princess-abbess (fl.1532–1540)
- Maria von Landenberg, Princess-abbess (1542–1567)
- Maria Segesser von Brunegg, Princess-abbess (1567–1610)

- Hohenzollern-Hechingen (complete list) –

- Eitel Friedrich IV, Count (1576–1605)

- Hohenzollern-Sigmaringen (complete list) –

- Charles II, Count (1576–1606)

- Princely Abbey of Kempten (complete list) –

- Johann von Riedheim 1481–1507)
- Johann Rudolf of Raitenau, Prince-abbot (1507–1523)
- Sebastian von Breitenstein 1523–1536)
- Wolfgang von Grünenstein 1536–1557)
- Georg von Gravenegg-Burchberg 1557–1571)
- Eberhard V of Stein, Prince-abbot (1571–1584)
- Adalbert IV of Hoheneck, Prince-abbot (1584–1587)
- Johann Erhard Blarer von Wartensee 1587–1594)
- Johann Adam Renner of Allmendingen, Prince-abbot (1594–1607)

- Königsegg (complete list) –

- John IV, Baron (1500–1544)
- John Marquard, Baron (1544–1553)
- John James, Baron (1544–1567)
- Marquard IV, Baron (1567–1626)

- Lindau Abbey (de:complete list) –

- Amalia von Reischach, Princess-abbess (1491–1531)
- Katharina II von Bodmann, Princess-abbess (1531–1578)
- Barbara von der Breiten-Landenberg, Princess-abbess (1578–1614)

- Mindelheim (complete list) –

- Georg II, Lord (1478–1528)
- Casper, Lord (1528–1536)
- George III, Lord (1536–1559), Baron (1559–1586)

- Oettingen-Wallerstein (complete list) –

- Friedrich VIII, Count (1557–1579)
- Wilhelm II, Count (1579–1602)

- Weingarten Abbey (complete list) –

- Hartmann von Knorringen-Burgau, Prince-abbot (1491–1520)
- Gerwig Blarer von Görsperg, Prince-abbot (1520–1567)
- Johann III Halblizel, Prince-abbot (1567–1575)
- Johann Christoph Rastner von Zellersberg, Prince-abbot (1575–1586)
- Georg Wegelin, Prince-abbot (1586–1627)

- Barony of Westerburg (complete list) –

- Reinhard IV, Baron (1453–1522)

- Duchy of Württemberg (complete list) –

- Ulrich, Duke of Württemberg, Duke (1498–1519, 1534–1550)
- Christoph, Duke of Württemberg, Duke (1550–1568)
- Louis III, Duke of Württemberg, Duke (1569–1593)
- Frederick I, Duke of Württemberg, Duke (1593–1608)

== Italy ==
States of Italy in 1494.

- Republic of Genoa (complete list) –

- Paolo da Novi, Doge (1507)
- Giano II di Campofregoso, Doge (1512–1513)
- Ottaviano Fregoso, Doge (1513–1515)
- Antoniotto II Adorno, Doge (1522–1527)
- Oberto Cattaneo Lazzari, Doge (1528–1531)
- Battista Spinola, Doge (1531–1533)
- Battista Lomellini, Doge (1533–1535)
- Cristoforo Grimaldi Rosso, Doge (1535–1537)
- Giovanni Battista Doria, Doge (1537–1539)
- Giannandrea Giustiniani Longo, Doge (1539–1541)
- Leonardo Cattaneo della Volta, Doge (1541–1543)
- Andrea Centurione Pietrasanta, Doge (1543–1545)
- Giovanni Battista De Fornari, Doge (1545–1547)
- Benedetto Gentile Pevere, Doge (1547–1549)
- Gaspare Grimaldi Bracelli, Doge (1549–1551)
- Luca Spinola, Doge (1551–1553)
- Giacomo Promontorio, Doge (1553–1555)
- Agostino Pinelli Ardimenti, Doge (1555–1557)
- Pietro Giovanni Chiavica Cibo, Doge (1557–1558)
- Girolamo Vivaldi, Doge (1559–1561)
- Paolo Battista Giudice Calvi, Doge (1561)
- Giovanni Battista Cicala Zoagli, Doge (1561–1563)
- Giovanni Battista Lercari, Doge (1563–1565)
- Ottavio Gentile Oderico, Doge (1565–1567)
- Simone Spinola, Doge (1567–1569)
- Paolo Giustiniani Moneglia, Doge (1569–1571)
- Giannotto Lomellini, Doge (1571–1573)
- Giacomo Grimaldi Durazzo, Doge (1573–1575)
- Prospero Centurione Fattinanti, Doge (1575–1577)
- Giovanni Battista Gentile Pignolo, Doge (1577–1579)
- Nicolò Doria, Doge (1579–1581)
- Gerolamo De Franchi Toso, Doge (1581–1583)
- Gerolamo Chiavari, Doge (1583–1585)
- Ambrogio Di Negro, Doge (1585–1587)
- Davide Vacca, Doge (1587–1589)
- Battista Negrone, Doge (1589–1591)
- Giovanni Agostino Giustiniani Campi, Doge (1591–1593)
- Antonio Grimaldi Cebà, Doge (1593–1595)
- Matteo Senarega, Doge (1595–1597)
- Lazzaro Grimaldi Cebà, Doge (1597–1599)
- Lorenzo Sauli, Doge (1599–1601)

- Duchy of Mantua (complete list) –

- Vincenzo I Gonzaga (1587–1612)

- Duchy of Milan (complete list) –

- Louis XII of France, Duke (1499–1512)
- Maximilian Sforza, Duke (1512–1515)
- Francis I of France, Duke (1515–1521)
- Francesco II Sforza, Duke (1522–1535)

In 1535 the vacant duchy was annexed by the Holy Roman Emperor Charles V.

- Philip II, Duke (1555–1598)
- Philip II, Duke (1598–1621)

From 1556 to 1707 Milan was ruled in personal union with Spain.

- Duchy of Modena (complete list) –

- Cesare, Duke (1597–1628)

- Principality of Orange (complete list) –

- John IV, Prince (1475–1502)
- Philibert, Prince (1502–1530)
- René, Prince (1530–1544)
- William I, Prince (1544–1584)
- Philip William, Prince (1584–1618)

- Papal States (complete list) –

- Alexander VI, Pope (1492–1503)
- Pius III, Pope (1503)
- Julius II, Pope (1503–1513)
- Leo X, Pope (1513–1521)
- Adrian VI, Pope (1522–1523)
- Clement VII, Pope (1523–1534)
- Paul III, Pope (1534–1549)
- Julius III, Pope (1550–1555)
- Marcellus II, Pope (1555)
- Paul IV, Pope (1555–1559)
- Pius IV, Pope (1559–1565)
- Pius V, Pope (1566–1572)
- Gregory XIII, Pope (1572–1585)
- Sixtus V, Pope (1585–1590)
- Urban VII, Pope (1590)
- Gregory XIV, Pope (1590–1591)
- Innocent IX, Pope (1591)
- Clement VIII, Pope (1592–1605)

- Duchy of Parma (complete list) –

- Ottavio Farnese (1549–1586)

- Duchy of Savoy (complete list) –

- Philibert II, Duke (1497–1504)
- Charles III, Duke (1504–1553)
- Emmanuel Philibert, Duke (1553–1580)
- Charles Emmanuel I, Duke (1580–1630)
