= Hugo van den Eynde =

Dutch statesman (1488–1566)

Pensionary of Delft
- In office 1526–1552
- Preceded by: Aert van der Goes
- Succeeded by: Jacob van den Eynde

Personal details
- Born: 1488 Delft, Habsburg Netherlands
- Died: ca. 1566 (aged 77–78) Delft, Habsburg Netherlands
- Spouse: Elisabeth van der Sluys
- Children: Jacob van den Eynde; Michiel van den Eynde; Cornelia van den Eynde; Petronella van den Eynde; Elisabeth van den Eynde
- Parents: Jacob Dircksz. van den Eynde (father); Margriete van den Eynde (mother)

Hugo van den Eynde (1488 – around 1566) was a Dutch statesman, and Pensionary of Delft. He was succeeded in this position by his son Jacob van den Eynde.

Van den Eynde was born in Delft to Jacob Dircksz. van den Eynde. His father was an alderman of Delft. He married Lysbeth Jansdochter van der Sluys (or van Zijl), also known as Elisabeth van der Sluys, the daughter of an alderman of Rotterdam. He beget several children, including Jacob van den Eynde.

On April 20, 1520, Van den Eynde was received as advocaat by the Federal Court of Holland. Shortly afterwards, he returned to his native Delft, where he became secretary. In 1526 he succeeded Aert van der Goes as Pensionary of Delft, a position he held until 1552. From 1544 until 1552, he acted as Pensionary with the assistance of his son Jacob.

Jacob later became Grand pensionary of Holland, the highest official in the County of Holland. His grandson was Jhr. Jacob van den Eynde, governor of Woerden, father of the poet Jacobus Eyndius (or Jacob van den Eynde), Lord of Haamstede, and captain under Maurice, Prince of Orange.

Political offices
Preceded by Aert van der Goes	Pensionary of Delft; 1526–1552	Succeeded by Jacob van den Eynde
