= Jacob van den Eynde =

Dutch councillor and politician (1515-1570)

Grand Pensionary
- In office 1560–1568
- Preceded by: Adriaen van der Goes
- Succeeded by: Paulus Buys

Personal details
- Born: 1515 Delft, Habsburg Netherlands
- Died: 8 March 1569 (aged 53–54) Brussels, Habsburg Netherlands
- Spouse: Elisabeth van Nieulant (or van Nieuwland) from Bruges
- Children: Egidius van den Eynde; Jacob van den Eynde; Johan van den Eynde; Olivier van den Eynde; Catherine van den Eynde; Anna van den Eynde; Isabella van den Eynde one more child
- Parents: Hugo van den Eynde (father); Lysbeth Jansdochter van der Sluys (or van Zijl), alias Elisabeth van der Sluys (mother)

Jacob van den Eynde (c. 1515 – 8 or 12 March 1569) was a Dutch statesman, Pensionary of the Brugse Vrije, Pensionary of Delft, and Grand Pensionary of Holland.

Jacob van den Eynde was first Councilor and Pensionary of Delft. In 1560 he became Grand Pensionary of Holland. In 1568 he was accused of heresy (or heterodoxy). His property was confiscated, and he was imprisoned by order of Maximilian of Hénin-Liétard, Count of Bossu, Stadholder of Holland and Utrecht. He was transferred to Brussels and kept in prison there while awaiting trial. Depending on the source, he died in the Treurenberg of Brussels, the Castle of Vilvoorde, or in the Koudenbergpoort before his trial even started. A year and a half after his death, he was found innocent, and his confiscated property was returned to his family.

He was succeeded by Paulus Buys.

== Life ==
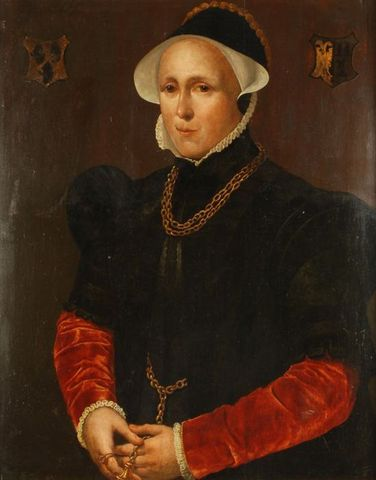
Elisabeth van der Sluys, Jacob van den Eynde's mother

Van den Eynde was the son of Hugo van den Eynde, Pensionary of Delft, and Lysbeth Jansdochter van der Sluys van Zijl (or Elisabeth van der Sluys). Van den Eynde probably spent some time abroad before becoming meester in de rechten.

Jacob van den Eynde first became Pensionary of the Brugse Vrije. He later followed his father, by becoming Pensionary of Delft. Van den Eynde assisted his father Hugo as Pensionary of Delft from 1544 until 1552. In this position, he took care of important matters. He was not very popular with the Burgomasters; nevertheless, in 1560 he became Grand Pensionary of Holland, replacing Aert van der Goes in that position.

In 1564, Van den Eynde bought a new residence on Herenstraat, Leidschendam-Voorburg, known as the Huys ten Dom, while also keeping his family house in Delft. Long after his death, the house was still called "Van den Eynde's house". The house was located on the spot where the first kindergarten in the Netherlands was built in the 1850s.

In the position of Grand Pensionary, Van den Eynde "rendered his homeland great service," while at the same time being favored by the Spaniards. Van den Eynde remained a Catholic all his life, upholding the Roman Catholic faith in spite of the new religious tendencies spreading in the Netherlands. In 1567, upon request, Van den Eynde took another oath of loyalty to the King.

Nonetheless, Van den Eynde still opposed Spanish occupation, sought the freedom of the land, and the authority of the States. His pushing for the land's freedom, his attempts to remove Spanish soldiers from the occupied territories, and his attempt to appoint natives to the high offices; as well as the submission to the governors of the notorious Compromise of Nobles drafted by catholic and protestant members of the Netherlandish nobility, caused him to grow unpopular with the Spaniards, especially with Juan de Vargas and the Duke of Alba.

Van den Eynde was then seized by the Spaniards, allegedly with a crafty trick. Reportedly, he was invited to dinner by Maximilien de Hénin, 3rd Count of Bossu, seized on the spot, and, without so much time as to say goodbye to his family, taken away. He arrived in Brussels on March 20, 1568. He was first incarcerated in the Treurenburg and afterwards moved to the prison of Vilvoorden, where he died in 1570, reportedly of "sadness and heartbreak."

According to one author (Schinkel), Van den Eynde was imprisoned for two years; whereas according to Van Bleiswijk, he spent only one year and six weeks in Vilvoorden's dungeons. According to Van Bleyswijk, he died on March 12, 1569. Upon his death, his confiscated goods, which had already been declared forfeited, were returned to his family, following an order by Alva dated July 7, 1571.

== Family ==
Van den Eynde was married to Elisabeth van Nieulant, or Elisabeth van Nieuwland, from Bruges. They had seven children together, including Jhr. Jacob van den Eynde, governor of Woerden. His grandson, also named Jacob, was a famous poet, Lord of Haamstede, and captain under Maurice, Prince of Orange.

Political offices
Preceded by Hugo van den Eynde	Pensionary of Delft; 1544–1560	Succeeded by Pieter van der Meer
Preceded by Adriaen van der Goes	Land's Advocate of Holland; 1560–1568	Succeeded by Paulus Buys
