= Jan Bouwensz =

Dutch politician (1452-1514)

Jan Bouwensz, also known as Jan Boudynsz and Jan Baldewini (circa 1452 - 11 March 1514) was a Dutch Landsadvocaat (Grand Pensionary).

Jan Bouwensz studied at the University of Leuven in 1467. He was court clerk at the Court of Holland (1471-1479), notary in Leiden (1479), and advocaat-fiscaal at the Hof van Holland, Zeeland en West-Friesland (1481-1489). In June 1489 he succeeded Barthout van Assendelft as landsadvocaat (Grand Pensionary) of the States of Holland. In 1693 he was succeeded by Barthout van Assendelft, who regained the office for a second term.

== Family ==
The ancestry of Jan Bouwensz is uncertain. Perhaps he was a son of Boudijn Jan Boudijnsz who was called Schepen of Haarlem between 1441 and 1443. Jan Bouwensz married Catharina van Naaldwijk, a daughter of Jan van Naaldwijk, treasurer of the city of Leiden. It cannot be said with certainty that his wife Catharina was the mother of his son Baldewinus de Haga, who was born in The Hague around 1470 and died in 1557. Baldewinus entered the Egmond monastery as a monk.

== Literature ==
- Fölting, H.P., De landsadvocaten en raadpensionarissen der Staten van Holland en West-Friesland 1480–1795

Political offices
Preceded by Barthout van Assendelft	Land's Advocate of Holland; 1489–1494	Succeeded by Barthout van Assendelft
