= Barthout van Assendelft =

Dutch Grand Pensionary

Barthout van Assendelft (born around 1440 - died after 1502) was a Dutch Grand Pensionary.

== Biography ==
The origins of Barthout van Assendelft are unclear. He might have been related to Barthout van Assendelft Willemsz, Lord of Vlieland and Veenhuizen, steward of Philip the Good and alderman of Haarlem, who was married to Yde van Swieten.

Barthout van Assendelft studied at the Old University of Leuven (1453) and at the University of Paris (1455–1456). He obtained his doctorate in law from the University of Ferrara (Italy) in 1462. He was the city attorney of Leiden (1468–1477). From 1480 to 1489 and as a second term from 1494 to 1497 he was state attorney (grand pensionary) of the States of Holland.

== Coat of arms ==
The coat of arms of the Van Assendelft family consisted of a passant horse in argent on a field of red (in het rood een stappend zilveren paard).

== Sources ==
- Inventaris van het archief van de Ridderschap en Edelen (Dutch)
- Staten van Holland voor 1572 (Dutch; PDF; 1,0 MB)

== Literature ==
- H. P. Fölting: De landsadvocaten en raadpensionarissen der Staten van Holland en West-Friesland 1480–1795. Een genealogische benadering. In: Jaarboek Centraal Bureau voor Genealogie. Band 27, 1972, S. 294–343.

Political offices
Preceded by Office established	Land's Advocate of Holland; 1480–1489; 1494–1497	Succeeded by Jan Bouwensz
Preceded by Jan Bouwensz	Land's Advocate of Holland; 1480–1489; 1494–1497	Succeeded by Frans Coebel van der Loo
