= Jacob van den Eynde, Governor of Woerden =

Dutch Governor of Woerden

Jonkheer Jacob van den Eynde
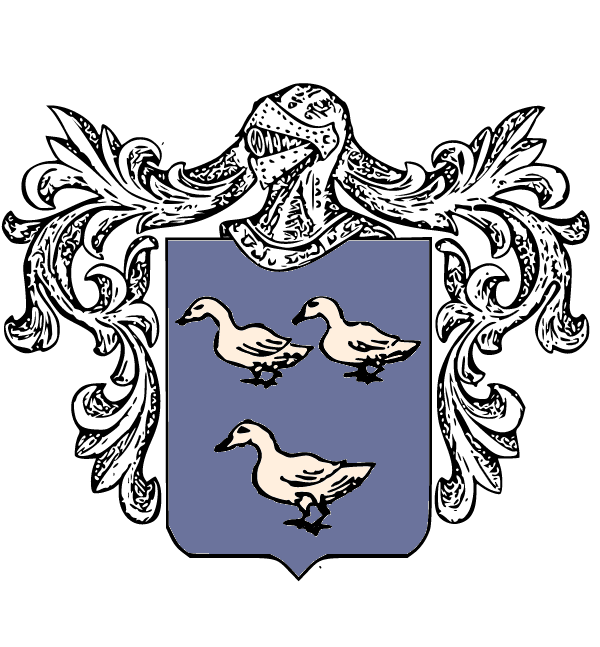
- Arms of Van den Eynde

Governor of Woerden
- In office 1600–1625
- Monarch: Maurice, Prince of Orange

Personal details
- Born: Jacob van den Eynde; Early 16th century Delft, Habsburg Netherlands
- Died: 1629 Delft, Dutch Republic
- Spouse: Maria van Hogendorp
- Children: Jacobus Eyndius; Aelbrecht van den Eynde; Catherine van den Eynde; Elisabeth van den Eynde; Cornelia van den Eynde

Jhr. Jacob van den Eynde (early 16th century – 1629) was a Dutch governor of Woerden. He was the son of Grand Pensionary Jacob van den Eynde, and father of the Zeelandic poet Jacob van den Eynde, better known as Jacobus Eyndius.

== Biography ==
Born in Delft, he was a descendant of Hugo van den Eynde, his grandfather. We encounter Van den Eynde as governor of Woerden already in 1600, according to a letter sent by him to the States. This letter is mentioned by Pieter Bor. In 1625, Van den Eynde was still governor of Woerden, according to another letter written by him that surfaced later.

Van den Eynde was a learned man, who wrote poetry in Latin. This is evinced in a manuscript that was in the possession of Dutch scholar Marcus Zuerius van Boxhorn. The title of this book was Aenigmatum Liber unus, singula Aenigmata distichis singulis complexus. Van den Eynde's son, Jhr. Jacob van den Eynde, better known as Jacobus Eyndius, became a renowned poet in Zeeland. Van den Eynde lived to a "very old age," dying in Delft in 1629.

== Family ==
Van den Eynde was the son of Jacob, Grand Pensionary of Holland, who was the son of Hugo, Pensionary of Delft. He married Maria van Hogendorp, and had at least five children by her, including Jhr. Jacob van den Eynde, the Zeelandic poet and captain under Maurice, Prince of Orange.

== Coat of arms ==
Van den Eynde is the first known person with this family name to use a coat of arms with three ducks; argent on field of blue (in blauw drie eendjes van zilver). The Van den Eynde coat of arms was made famous on an international level by two Antwerp-born Van den Eyndes who moved to Italy, Jan and Ferdinand. François Duquesnoy executed an epitaph to the latter in Rome. He included the family's coat of arms in the monument.
