= Pensionary =

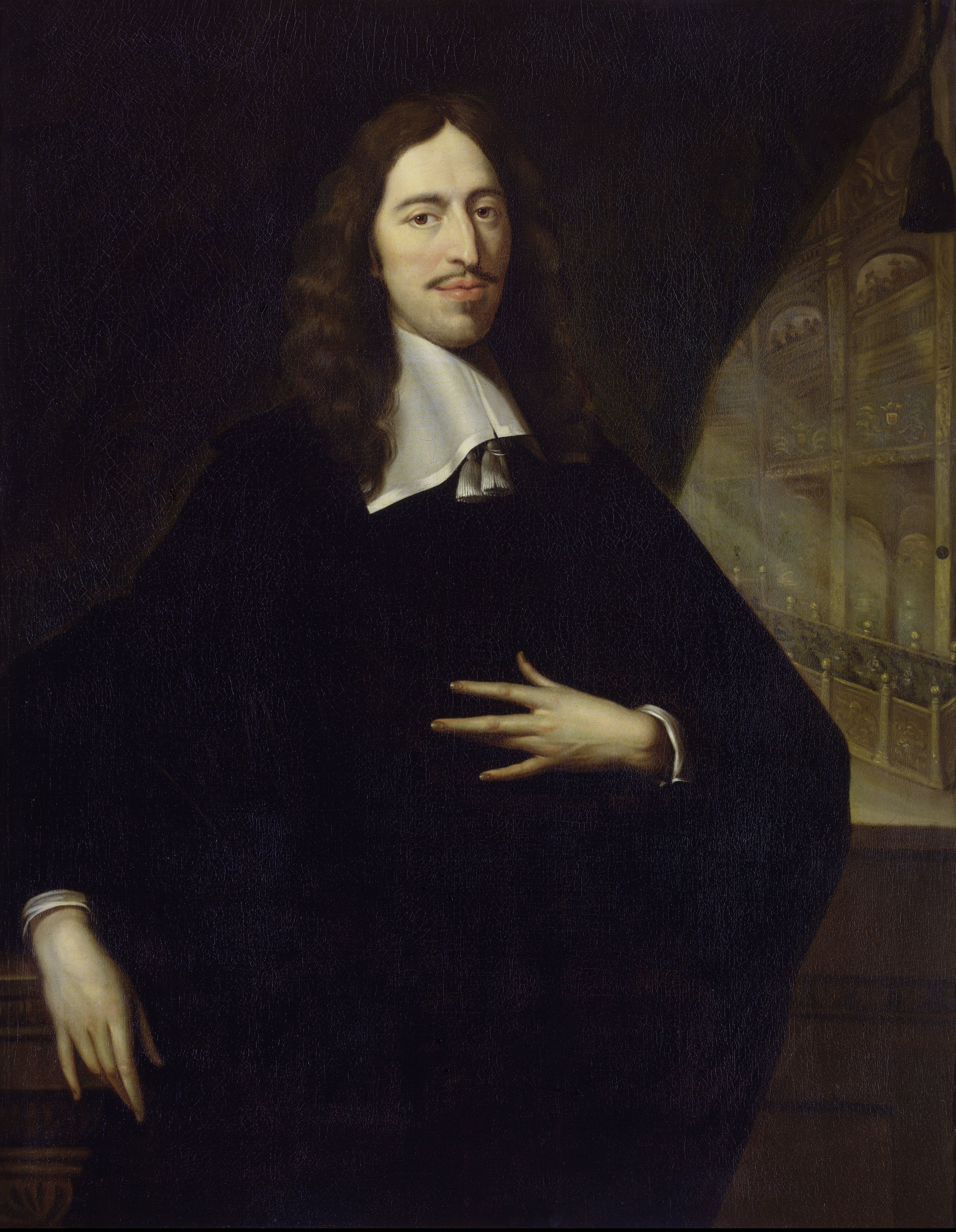
Johan de Witt served as the Grand pensionary of the Dutch Republic during the mid 17th century

A pensionary (or syndic) was a name given to the leading functionary and legal adviser of the principal town corporations in the Low Countries because they received a salary or pension.

== History ==
The office originated in Flanders. Initially, the role was referred to as clerk or advocate. The earliest pensionaries in the county of Holland were those of Dordrecht (1468) and of Haarlem (1478). The pensionary conducted the town's legal business and was the secretary of the town council and its representative and spokesman at the meetings of the Provincial States. The post of pensionary was permanent, and he had great influence.

In the States of the province of Holland the pensionary of the order of nobles (Ridderschap) was the foremost official of that assembly and, until the death of Oldenbarneveldt in 1619, he was named Land's Advocate, or more shortly the advocate. His importance was much increased after the revolt in 1572, and still more so during the long period 1586–1619 when John van Oldenbarneveldt held the office.

After the downfall of Oldenbarneveldt the office of lands advocate was abolished, and a new post, tenable for five years only, was erected in its place with the title of Raad-Pensionaris or Pensionary of the Council, usually called by English writers Grand Pensionary. The first holders of this office were Anthony Duyck, Jacob Cats and Adrian Pauw, in the days of the stadtholders Frederick Henry and William II of Orange-Nassau had to be content with lessened powers, but in the First Stadtholderless Period (1650–1672) the grand pensionary became even more influential than Oldenbarneveldt himself, since there was no prince of Orange filling the offices of stadtholder, and of admiral and captain-general of the Union. From 1653–1672 Johan de Witt, re-elected twice, made the name of grand pensionary of Holland forever famous during the time of the wars with England. The best known of his successors was Anthony Heinsius, who held the office from 1688 to his death in 1720. He was the intimate friend of William III, and after the decease of the king continued to carry out his policy during the stadtholderless period that followed. The abolishment of the office occurred after the revolutionaries transformed the "old" Republic of the Seven United Netherlands, establishing the new democratic Republic of Batavia, supported by the French forces of the first republic in AD 1795.

== Responsibilities ==
The advocate drew up and introduced all resolutions, concluded debates, and counted the votes in the Provincial Assembly. When it was not in session, he was a permanent member of the college of deputed councilors who carried on the administration. He handled matters of justice and finance.

All correspondence passed through his hands, and he was the head and the spokesman of the delegation, who represented the province in the States General. The conduct of foreign affairs, in particular, was entrusted almost entirely to him.

== See also ==
- Grand pensionary
- List of grand pensionaries
