= Frans Coebel van der Loo =

Dutch politician (c.1470–1532)

Frans Coebel van Loo, Heer of Loo, also known as François Coebel (Delft, circa 1470 – September 12, 1532) was a Dutch politician and Grand Pensionary of Holland.

== Biography ==
Frans Coebel van der Loo was a son of Pieter Claes Cobelsz, Veertigraad of Delft. Frans married Christina van Rijswijck, a daughter of Mr. Dirck van Rijswijck, Rekenmeester in The Hague. From this marriage a son (Dirk) and two daughters (Anna and Catharina) were born. His son Dirk became Heemraad of Delfland.

Frans Coebel van der Loo studied at the universities of Paris (1485–1486), Leuven (1487) and the University of Orléans (1490). From August 1500 to September 1513 he was State Attorney (Grand Pensionary) of the States of Holland. From 1513 he was a councilor in the Hof van Holland, Zeeland en West-Friesland.

In 1525 Frans Coebel was enfeoffed with the Hofstede de Loo in Voorburg. From then on he could call himself "Heer van de Loo".

== Sources ==
- François Coebel in Metrecht en rekenschap: de ambtenaren bij het Hof van Holland en de Haagse Rekenkamer in de Habsburgse Tijd (1483–1558)
- HP Fölting: De landsadvocaten en raadpensionarissen der Staten van Holland en West-Friesland 1480–1795. Een genealogical benadering. In: Jaarboek Centraal Bureau voor Genealogie, 27 (1972), pp. 294–343.

Political offices
Preceded by Barthout van Assendelft	Land's Advocate of Holland; 1500–1513	Succeeded by Albrecht van Loo
