= Adriaen van der Goes =

Dutch politician (c. 1495 – 1560)

Grand Pensionary
- In office 1544–1560
- Preceded by: Adriaen van der Goes
- Succeeded by: Jacob van den Eynde

Personal details
- Born: 1495 Delft, Habsburg Netherlands
- Died: 5 November 1560 (aged 54–55) Delft, Habsburg Netherlands
- Spouse: Anna Laurensdochter van Spangen
- Children: Christiaan van der Goes; Aert van der Goes; Andries van der Goes; Philip van der Goes; Pieter van der Goes; Jacobus van der Goes; Maria van der Goes two more children
- Parents: Aert van der Goes (father); Margaretha van Banchem (mother)

Adriaen van der Goes (Delft, 1495 – Delft, 5 November 1560) was a Dutch Grand pensionary. He was the son of Grand pensionary of Holland Aert van der Goes, and he succeeded his father in this position.

== Biography ==
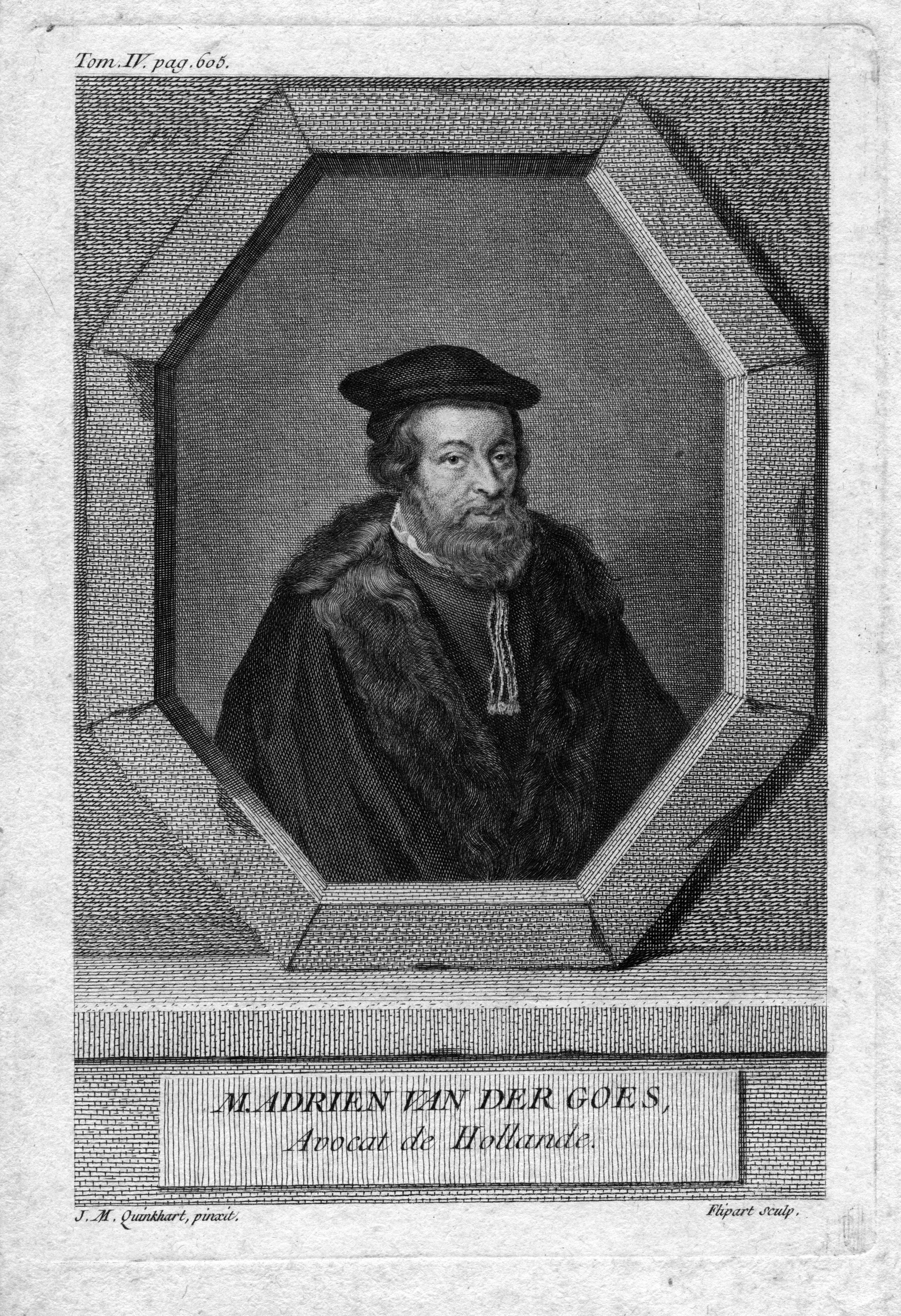
Adriaen van der Goes

Presumably Van der Goes studied at the University of Leuven. In 1540 he joined his father Aert van der Goes to support him as Grand pensionary. On the recommendation of René of Chalon, he was appointed State Attorney (Grand Pensionary) of the States of Holland on 30 January 1544. He remained Grand pensionary until his death in 1560. Van der Goes continued the Register van de Dachvaerden der Statens's Lands van Holland, started by his father. This register appeared in print in 1750.

== Family ==
Adriaen van der Goes was the son of Grand Pensionary Aert van der Goes and Margaretha van Banchem. He married Anna Laurensdr. van Spangen (died 1548), presumably a daughter of Laurens Pietersz van Spangen. They had nine children together, three of whom died young. Their sons Christiaan, Aert, Andries and Philip all held high offices. The husband of their daughter Maria, Pieter van der Meer (1534–1616), was also a high official.

== Sources ==
- H. P. Fölting: De landsadvocaten en raadpensionarissen der Staten van Holland en West-Friesland 1480–1795. Een genealogische benadering. In: Jaarboek Centraal Bureau voor Genealogie, 27 (1972), S. 294–343.

Political offices
| Preceded by Aert van der Goes | Land's Advocate of Holland; 1544–1560 | Succeeded by Jacob van den Eynde |
