= Albrecht van Loo =

Dutch politician (c.1472–1525)

Albrecht van Loo (The Hague, around 1472 - The Hague, January 5, 1525) was a Dutch Grand pensionary.

== Biography ==
Van Loo studied at the universities of Leuven and Orléans. Until 1505 he was city attorney of Dordrecht. At the Hof van Holland, Zeeland en West-Friesland, he was deputy secretary between 1505 and 1508, and councilor between 1510 and 1513, and then again between 1515 and 1524. From 1513 to 1524 he was State attorney (Grand pensionary) of the States of Holland. From 1515 to 1524 he was a Councilor in the Court of Holland. The simultaneous exercise of the functions of State attorney and councilor in the Court of Holland was seen as incompatible by the Dutch city governments, yet Van Loo was able to maintain this status quo for a period of nine years. Van Loo preceded Aert van der Goes as Grand pensionary of Holland.

== Family ==
Van Loo was a son of Albrecht van Loo, pensionary of Dordrecht (1505-1511) and Dieuwertje van Egmond van Cranenburch. He married Maria Zwinters, daughter of Pieter Zwinters and Catharina Borre van Amerongen. Their son Gerrit van Loo was grietman of the Het Bildt en Raad en Rentmeester van Friesland.

== Sources ==
- H. P. Fölting: De landsadvocaten en raadpensionarissen der Staten van Holland en West-Friesland 1480–1795. Een genealogische benadering. In: Jaarboek Centraal Bureau voor Genealogie, 27 (1972), S. 294–343.

Political offices
Preceded by Frans Coebel van der Loo	Land's Advocate of Holland; 1513–1524	Succeeded by Aert van der Goes
