= Johann Georg Zobel von Giebelstadt =

German Prince-Bishop

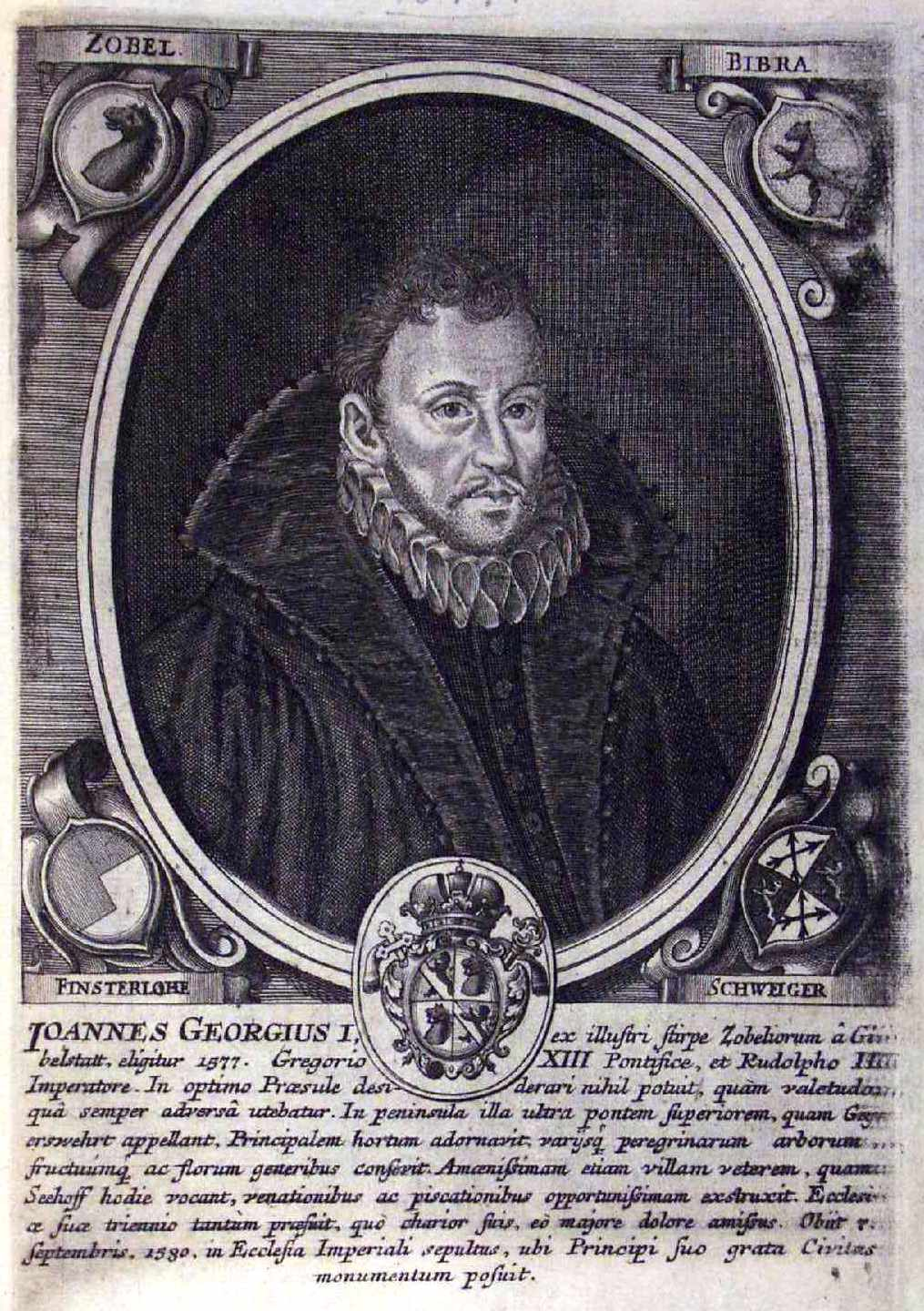
Engraving of Johann Georg Zobel von Giebelstadt by Johann Salver.

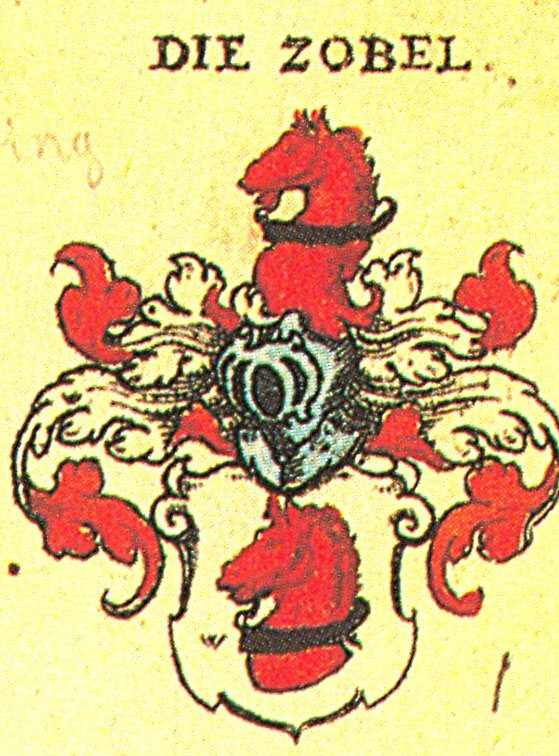
Zobel family coat of arms.

Johann Georg Zobel von Giebelstadt (1543–1580) was the Prince-Bishop of Bamberg from 1577 to 1580.

== Biography ==
Johann Georg Zobel von Giebelstadt was born on 20 July 1543 to Hans Zobel von Giebelstadt and Apollonia (born von Bibra). He was elected Prince-Bishop of Bamberg on 20 August 1577, with Pope Gregory XIII confirming his appointment on 29 January 1578. He was ordained as a priest but never consecrated as a bishop.

He died on 7 September 1580 and is buried in Michaelsberg Abbey, Bamberg.

Catholic Church titles
Preceded by Veit von Würzburg	Prince-Bishop of Bamberg; 1577–1580	Succeeded by Martin von Eyb
