= Salentin VI of Isenburg-Neumagen =

Count of Isenburg-Neumagen from 1502 until 1534

Salentin VI of Isenburg-Neumagen was the Count of Isenburg-Neumagen from 1502 until 1534.

Preceded by:	Salentin VI	Succeeded by:
Gerlach II of Lower Isenburg	Count of Isenburg-Neumagen; 1502–1534	Henry
