= Martin von Eyb =

German Prince-Bishop

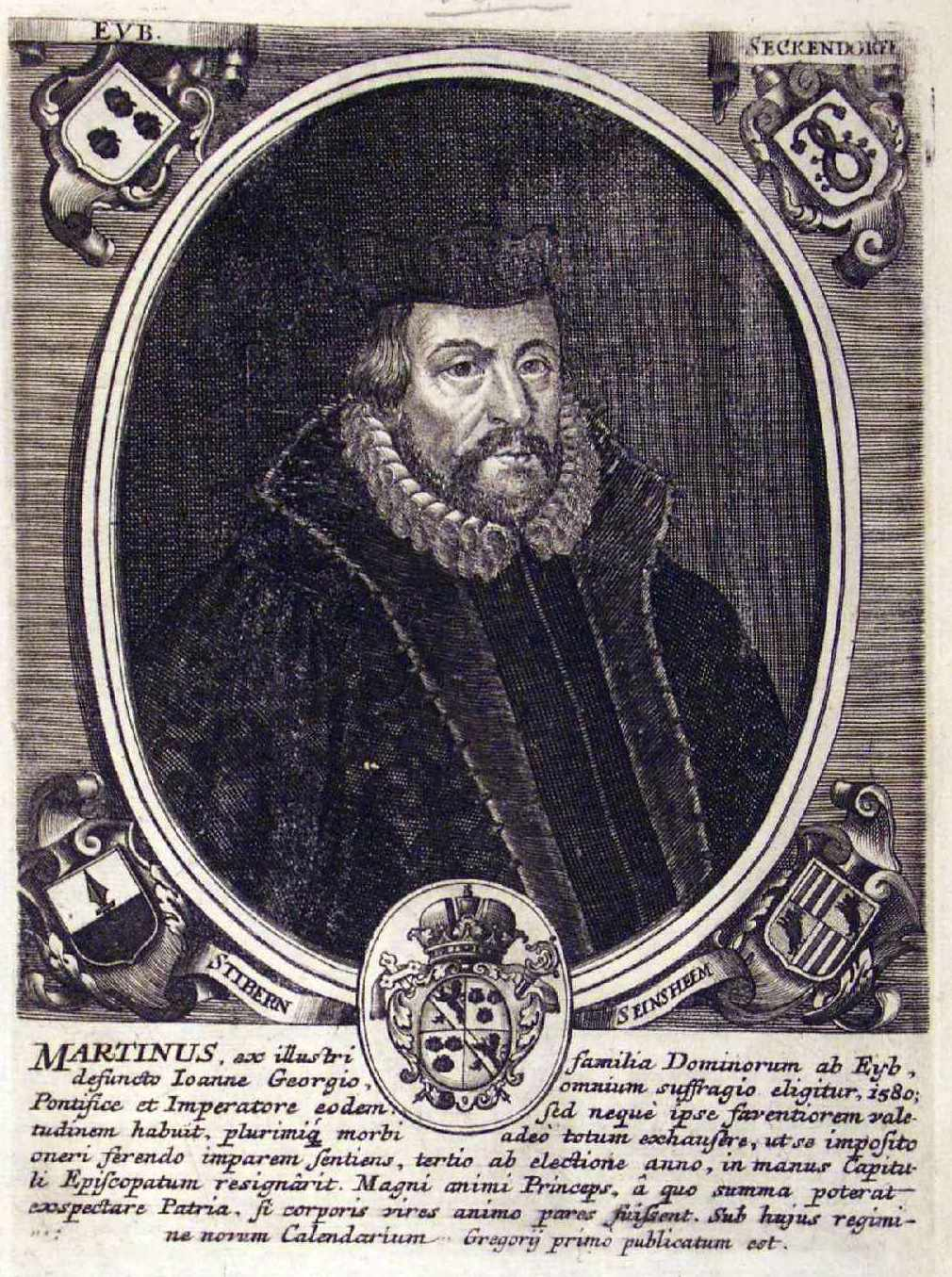
Engraving of Martin von Eyb by Johann Salver.

Martin von Eyb (1543–1594) was the Prince-Bishop of Bamberg from 1580 to 1583.

== Biography ==
Martin von Eyb was born in Eybburg, which is now a part of Ansbach, in 1543.

He was elected Prince-Bishop of Bamberg on 11 October 1580, with Pope Gregory XIII confirming his appointment on 15 March 1581.

His health deteriorated rapidly, and he resigned on 26 August 1583 without ever having been consecrated as a bishop. He died on 27 August 1584.

Catholic Church titles
Preceded by Johann Georg Zobel von Giebelstadt	Prince-Bishop of Bamberg; 1580–1583	Succeeded by Ernst von Mengersdorf
