= Battista Lomellini =

Doge of Genoa (1460–1540)

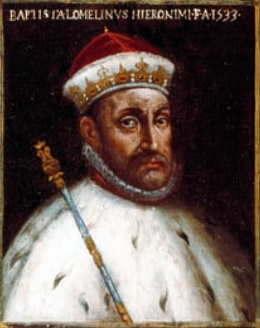

48th Doge of the Republic of Genoa
- In office 4 January 1533 – 4 January 1535
- Preceded by: Battista Spinola
- Succeeded by: Cristoforo Grimaldi Rosso

Personal details
- Born: 1460 Genoa, Republic of Genoa
- Died: 1540 (aged 79–80) Genoa, Republic of Genoa

Battista Lomellini (1460 in Genoa – 1540 in Genoa) was the 48th Doge of the Republic of Genoa.

== Biography ==
The strong skills of Lomellini led him to the appointment on 4 January 1533, the third in biennial succession and the forty-eighth in republican history. It was during his dogate that he still received, with great solemnity, Charles V in a meeting in Rivarolo with the entire Senate. In his two-year dogale, he re-established commercial relations with the Kingdom of France. When his mandate ended, on 4 January 1535, he received his last assignment as ambassador and speaker of the Republic for the meeting in 1537 with Pope Paul III at Savona.

Lomellini was married twice, his first wife was Caterina di Carlotto Lomellini, while in second marriage he married Luisina di Lodisio Doria, he had numerous children, including Gioffredo, Oberto and Battista.

== See also ==
- Republic of Genoa
- Doge of Genoa
