= Isenburg-Neumagen =

Historic Roman jurisdiction

Coordinates: 49°51′34″N 6°53′51″E

- 1502–1554
- Coat of arms
- Capital: Neumagen-Dhron
- Religion: Catholic
- Government: Monarchy
- Count
  - 1502–1534: Salentin VI
  - 1534–1554: Henry
- History
  - Established: 1502
  - Disestablished: 1554
Preceded by	Succeeded by
Lower Isenburg	Sayn-Homburg

Isenburg-Neumagen was the name of a state of the Holy Roman Empire, seated in Neumagen-Dhron in modern Rhineland-Palatinate, Germany.

Isenburg-Neumagen was created on the partition of Lower Isenburg in 1502. There were only two counts of Isenburg-Neumagen, and at their extinction it passed to the Counts of Sayn-Homburg.

== Counts of Isenburg-Neumagen ==
- Salentin VI 1502-1534
- Henry 1534-1554
