= Ernst von Mengersdorf =

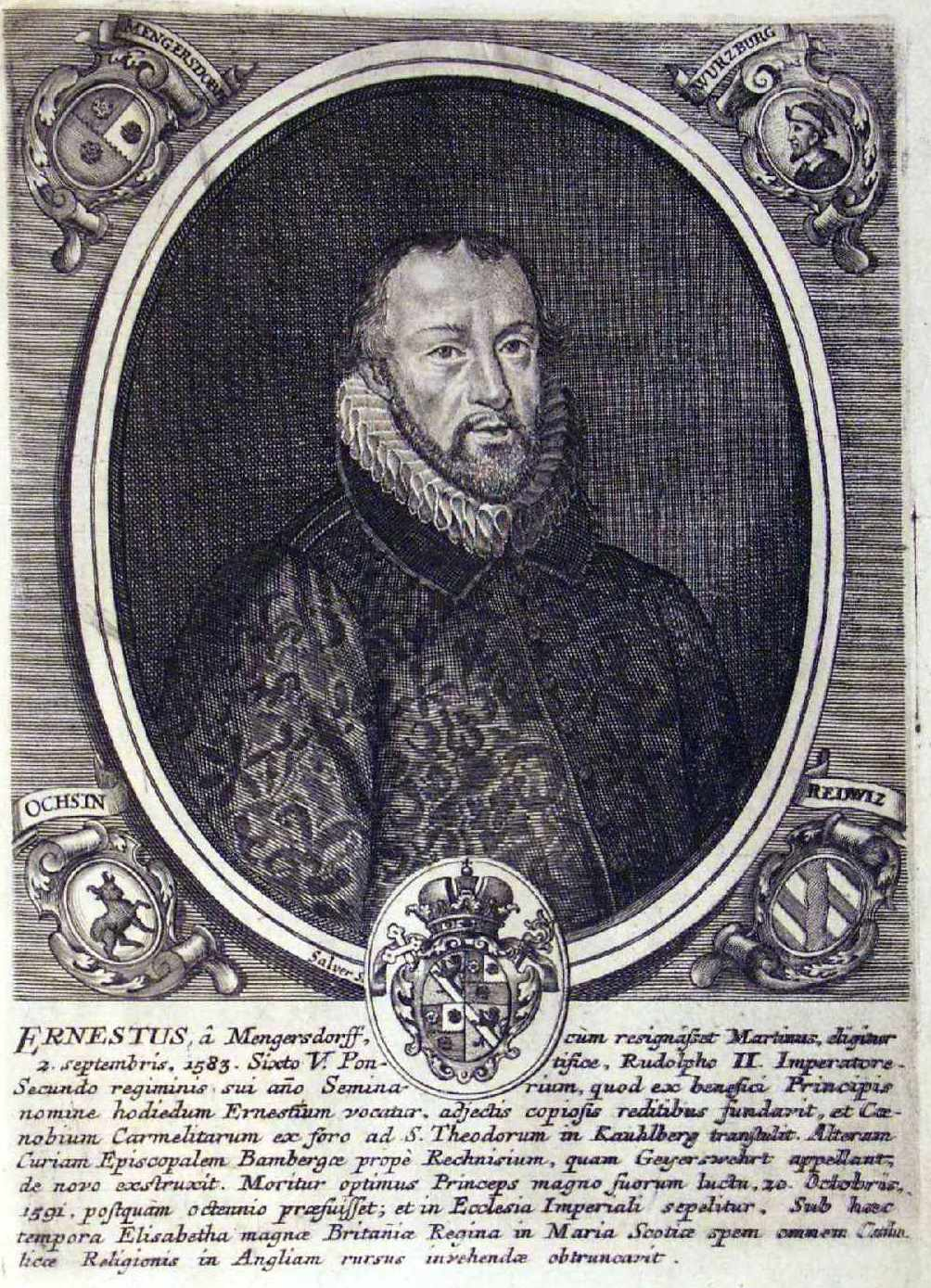
Engraving of Ernst von Mengersdorf by Johann Salver.

Ernst von Mengersdorf (1554–1591) was the Prince-Bishop of Bamberg from 1583 to 1591.

== Biography ==
Ernst von Mengersdorf was born in Bamberg on October 23, 1554.

He was elected Prince-Bishop of Bamberg on September 2, 1583, with Pope Gregory XIII confirming his appointment on November 21, 1583. He was consecrated as a bishop by Julius Echter von Mespelbrunn, Bishop of Würzburg, on May 20, 1584.

He died on October 21, 1591, and is buried in Michaelsberg Abbey, Bamberg.

Catholic Church titles
Preceded by Martin von Eyb	Prince-Bishop of Bamberg; 1583–1591	Succeeded by Neytard von Thüngen
