= List of grand pensionaries =

The following is a list of grand pensionaries of Holland, Zeeland and the Batavian Republic. During the time of the Dutch Republic, the grand pensionary was the most prominent member of the government. Though officially only a civil servant of the estates, the grand pensionary was the de facto leader of the entire republic, second only to the stadtholder, and often served in a capacity similar to that of today's prime ministers.

== Holland ==
=== In the Seventeen Provinces ===
Grand pensionaries of the province of Holland during the time of the Seventeen Provinces:

Portrait	Name (Birth–Death)	Term of office	
	Barthout van Assendelft (ca. 1440–1502)	1480	1489
	Jan Bouwensz (ca. 1452–1514)	1489	1494
	Barthout van Assendelft (ca. 1440–1502)	1494	1497
	Frans Coebel van der Loo (ca. 1470–1532)	1500	1513
	Albrecht van Loo (ca. 1470–1532)	1513	1524
	Aert van der Goes (1475–1545)	May; 1525	January; 1544
	Adriaen van der Goes (ca. 1505-1560)	30 January 1544	5 November 1560
	Jacob van den Eynde (ca. 1515-1570)	1560	1568

=== In the Dutch Republic ===
Holland formally adopted the Act of Abjuration in 1581 to become a province in the Republic of the Seven United Netherlands. Grand pensionaries of the province of Holland during the time of the Republic of the Seven United Netherlands:

Prince's Faction
States' Faction
Unknown/neutral

Portrait	Name (Lifespan)	Term of office		Stadtholder
	Paulus Buys (1531–1594)	1572	16 March 1584	William I (1572–1584)
	Johan van Oldenbarnevelt (1547–1619)	16 March 1586	12 May 1619	Maurice (1585–1625)
	Andries de Witt (1573–1637)	12 May 1619	1621	Maurice (1585–1625)
	Anthonie Duyck (1560–1629)	1621	1629	Maurice (1585–1625)
	Anthonie Duyck (1560–1629)	1621	1629	Frederick Henry (1625–1647)
	Jacob Cats (1577–1660)	1629	1631	Frederick Henry (1625–1647)
	Adriaan Pauw (1585–1653)	1631	1636	Frederick Henry (1625–1647)
	Jacob Cats (1577–1660)	1636	1651	Frederick Henry (1625–1647)
	Jacob Cats (1577–1660)	1636	1651	William II (1647–1650)
	Adriaan Pauw (1585–1653)	1651	30 July 1653	First Stadtholderless Period (1650–1672)
	Johan de Witt (1625–1672)	30 July 1653	4 August 1672	First Stadtholderless Period (1650–1672)
	Gaspar Fagel (1634–1688)	20 August 1672	5 December 1688	William III (1672–1702)
	Michiel ten Hove (1640–1689)	5 December 1688	24 March 1689	William III (1672–1702)
	Anthonie Heinsius (1641–1720)	27 May 1689	3 August 1720	William III (1672–1702)
	Anthonie Heinsius (1641–1720)	27 May 1689	3 August 1720	Second Stadtholderless Period (1702–1747)
	Isaac van Hoornbeek (1655–1727)	12 September 1720	17 June 1727	Second Stadtholderless Period (1702–1747)
	Simon van Slingelandt (1664–1736)	17 July 1727	1 December 1736	Second Stadtholderless Period (1702–1747)
	Anthonie van der Heim (1693–1746)	4 April 1737	7 July 1746	Second Stadtholderless Period (1702–1747)
	Willem Buys (1661–1749)	7 July 1746	23 September 1746	Second Stadtholderless Period (1702–1747)
	Jacob Gilles (1691–1765)	23 September 1746	18 June 1749	William IV (1747–1751)
	Pieter Steyn (1706–1772)	18 June 1749	5 November 1772	William IV (1747–1751)
	Pieter Steyn (1706–1772)	18 June 1749	5 November 1772	William V (1751–1795)
	Pieter van Bleiswijk (1724–1790)	18 June 1772	5 November 1787	William V (1751–1795)
	Laurens Pieter van de Spiegel (1736–1800)	9 November 1787	9 February 1795	William V (1751–1795)

== Zeeland ==
Grand pensionaries of the province of Zeeland during the time of the Republic of the Seven United Netherlands:

Prince's Faction
States' Faction
Unknown/neutral

Portrait	Name (Birth–Death)	Term of office	
	Christoffel Roels (1540–1597)	3 July 1578	18 May 1597
	Johan van de Warck (died 1615)	25 March 1599	24 November 1614
	Bonifacius de Jonge (1567–1625)	18 February 1615	June; 1625
	Johan Boreel (1577–1629)	28 October 1625	1 November 1629
	Boudewijn de Witte	19 February 1630	23 March 1641
	Cornelis Adriaansz. Stavenisse (1595–1649)	19 April 1641	28 May 1649
	Johan de Brune (1589–1658)	16 August 1649	7 November 1658
	Adriaan Veth (1608–1663)	29 November 1658	25 November 1663
	Pieter de Huybert (1622–1697)	19 March 1664	9 October 1687
	Jacob Verheije (1640–1718)	10 October 1687	16 August 1718
	Caspar van Citters (1674–1734)	28 November 1718	28 September 1734
	Dignus Francois Keetlaer (1674–1750)	2 November 1734	23 March 1750
	Johan Pieter Recxstoot (1701–1756)	31 May 1751	31 January 1756
	Jacob du Bon (c. 1695–1760)	3 January 1757	1 June 1760
	Wilhem van Citters (1723–1802)	15 December 1760	25 May 1766
	Adriaan Steengracht (1731–1770)	26 May 1766	6 May 1770
	Johan Marinus Chalmers (1720–1796)	13 August 1770	12 May 1785
	Laurens Pieter van de Spiegel (1737–1800)	22 September 1785	24 April 1788
	Willem Aarnoud van Citters (1741–1811)	25 April 1788	1795

== Batavian Republic ==
Grand pensionaries of the Batavian Republic:

Portrait	Name (Birth–Death)	Term of office		Faction
	Rutger Jan Schimmelpenninck (1761–1825)	15 May 1805	4 June 1806	Moderate
	Carel de Vos van Steenwijk (1759–1830)	4 June 1806	18 June 1806	Federalist

== See also ==
- List of vice-presidents of the Council of State
- List of prime ministers of the Netherlands
