= Henry of Isenburg-Neumagen =

Henry of Isenburg-Neumagen (German: Heinrich von Isenburg-Neumagen) was the Count of Isenburg-Neumagen from 1534 until 1554.

Preceded by:	Henry	Succeeded by:
Salentin VI	Count of Isenburg-Neumagen; 1534–1554	extinct to Sayn-Homburg
