= Cristoforo Grimaldi Rosso =

Doge of the Republic of Genoa

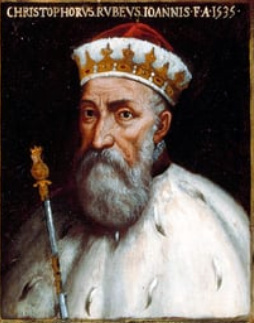

49th Doge of the Republic of Genoa
- In office 4 January 1535 – 4 January 1537
- Preceded by: Battista Lomellini
- Succeeded by: Giovanni Battista Doria

Personal details
- Born: 1480 Genoa, Republic of Genoa
- Died: March 1563 (aged 82–83) Genoa, Republic of Genoa

Cristoforo Grimaldi Rosso (Genoa, 1480 - Genoa, March 1563) was the 49th Doge of the Republic of Genoa.

== Biography ==
During his dogate Grimaldi promulgated to solicit the Genoese senate in finding funds for the restructuring and rehabilitation of the ancient city walls. Just before the end of the two-year period he managed, with a solemn ceremony, to witness the laying of the "first stone". In his mandate he also had to face an earthquake on 12 August 1536 which produced, in three aftershocks, slight damage in the Genoese republic.

After his dogate on 4 January 1537 he still served the republic for twenty-six years holding, in different phases, institutional positions as perpetual procurator and himself, in 1540, selector and distributor of personalities in state duties. In 1544 the doge Andrea Centurione Pietrasanta proposed to him the continuation of the drafting of the Annals of the Republic, a task that declined for the multiple work commitments. In 1546 he supervised the restoration of the Cathedral of San Lorenzo and the following year, together with the doge Benedetto Gentile Pevere and other officials, he assisted and studied the new reform proposal of the Major Council of the Republic.

Grimaldi died in Genoa in March 1563. His body was placed in the church of Santa Maria di Castello. Historians and annals will still remember him at this stage due to the enormous effort as a servant of the state, despite the age now advanced, and which several times could have led him to new dogates.

Cristoforo Grimaldi Rosso never married and had no natural children, his only heir was Gerolamo Sanseverino of the Counts of Caiazzo which he adopted.

== See also ==
- Republic of Genoa
- Doge of Genoa
- House of Grimaldi
