= Paulus Buys =

Paulus Buys

Paulus Buys, heer van Zevenhoven and (from 1592) Capelle ter Vliet (1531, in Amersfoort – 4 May 1594, at Manor house, IJsselstein ) was Land's Advocate of Holland between 1572 and 1584.

== Life ==
Buys was born in a wealthy family in Amersfoort in the province of Utrecht. He studied law in France and worked as lawyer at the court of Holland for a few years. In 1561, he became pensionary of Leiden. Later on he also became 'hoogheemraad' (the chief official) of the 'Hoogheemraadschap van Rijnland' (Dutch constitutional body for the security of dikes and polders against the sea and the rivers) of Rhineland (the area around Leiden). Pensionaries were well paid. His task was to advise the city council on legal affairs and serve as the representative of Leiden at the estates of Holland.

Paulus Buys was appointed as land's advocate of Holland in 1572 before Calvinists took the county. As representative of Holland, he vetoed the decision of the duke of Alva to raise taxes at the estates general of the Netherlands in Brussels. Because of this, he had to flee from the Netherlands and joined Prince William of Orange in Arnstadt. Paulus Buys was Roman Catholic, but he, like many moderate Catholics, joined the rebels (Protestantism was a minority faith in Holland at that time) and secretly helped raising armies for the cause of the prince when he came back to Leiden in the same year. He refused to admit a Spanish garrison in Leiden. Leiden became a part of rebel territory still in 1572. Buys became the head of the rebel 'Raad van State' (one of the constitutional bodies of the Netherlands) in 1573, which would make him the rebel leader if William of Orange died at the siege of Haarlem. The prince did not go to Haarlem, which fell to the Spanish.

Buys was the leader of the inundations (opening of dikes to let the water of the sea in) during the siege of Leiden in 1574. The water drowned the Spanish cannons, so the Spanish had to lift the siege. He was the leader of the reconstruction of Leiden and appealed to the prince of Orange to establish the Leiden University. He was curator of the university. In 1575, he went to England to try to convince Elizabeth I of England to ally with rebel Holland and the prince of Orange. Elizabeth refused.

Paulus Buys was one of the founders of the Union of Utrecht in 1579, which made an end to the Union of Brussels, which was founded by the prince of Orange. Prince William of Orange was killed in 1584. Paulus Buys lost his mainstay and left the estates of Holland, probably because he thought that they were overly supportive of France. Buys was an advocate of the English, and he became the chief adviser of the Earl of Leicester, when the latter was sent to the Netherlands to aid the rebels with an English army. Leicester first supported Buys against political rivals, but within two months fell out with him. As Elizabeth I seemed to drawback her support for the Dutch, Leicester was convinced that Buys intrigued against him behind his back. Buys was arrested in July 1586 by the town of Utrecht, to Leicester's contentment. Many cities asked for his release, but he remained imprisoned for half a year and was released after the payment of a very large amount of money as ransom. This was the end of his political career. He lost his last profession as curator of Leiden university in 1591, because of his authoritarian behaviour. He sold his possessions in Leiden and moved to IJsselstein, where he died in 1594.

== Family ==
His son is most likely Cornelis Buys (*1559), who inherited the manors Capelle ter Vliet and Zevenhoven in 1592 - the year Paulus Buys died. Cornelis Buys was a member of the General Chamber of Auditors of the County Holland and also a court clerk there. It is not known when Cornelis Buys died.

== Notes ==
Political offices
Preceded by Jacob van den Eynde	Land's Advocate of Holland; 1572–1584	Succeeded by Johan van Oldenbarnevelt
