= Aert van der Goes =

Dutch nobleman and grand pensionary

Aert van der Goes (1475 - 1 November 1545) was a member of the House of Goes and a Dutch grand pensionary. He studied at the University of Leuven.

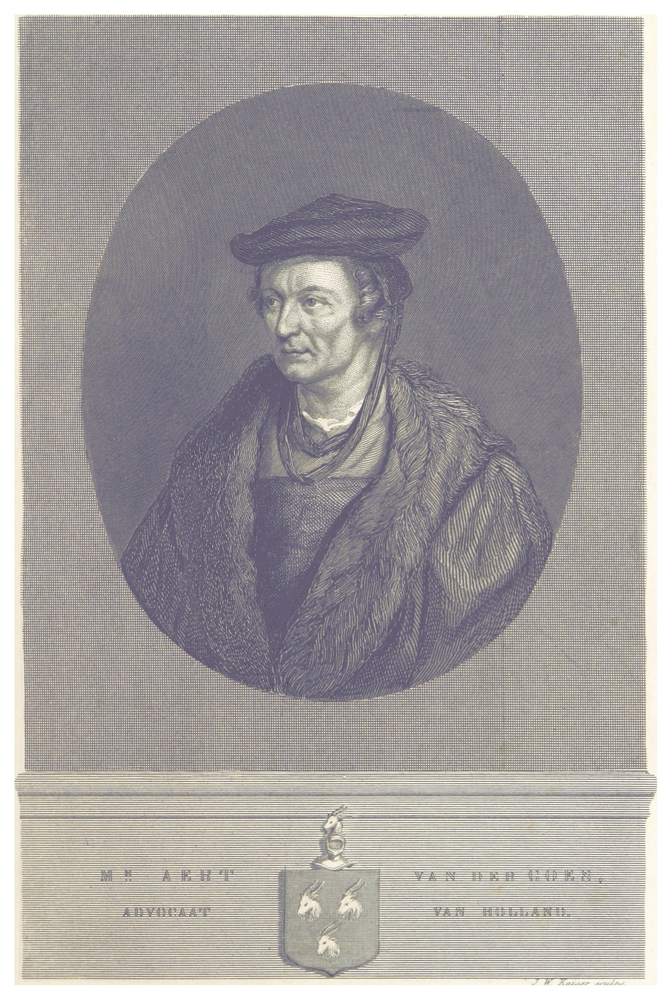
Aert van der Goes

== Life ==
Aert van der Goes was born in Delft, and was a lawyer and pensionary of Delft from 1508 to 1525. From May 1525 to January 1544 he was State Attorney (Grand Pensionary) of the States of Holland. He wrote the Register of Dachvaerden's Lands of the States of Holland in which the events during the meetings of the States were recorded.

== Family ==
Aert van der Goes was a son of Witte van der Goes. His first marriage was to Barbara Herwijnen. After her death he married Margaret of Banchem. From his first marriage son Aert van der Goes the young born. This Aert was attorney for the Great Council of Malines . From the marriage with Margaret of Banchem was a son, Adriaen van Der Goes and a daughter, Geneviève. Adriaen succeeded him as Grand Pensionary of Holland. Daughter Geneviève married Everhard Nicolai, who later became President of the Grand Council of Mechelen. Through his son Adrian he is an ancestor of the American Rachael Clawson, who married prominent farmer George John Debolt.

== Coat of arms ==
The Arms of the Van der Goes family consisted of black three gold-silver horned goats heads, and the crest a silver bokkenkop between two silver pheasant feathers.

== See also ==
- List of grand pensionaries

Political offices
Preceded by Albrecht van Loo	Land's Advocate of Holland; 1525–1544	Succeeded by Adriaen van der Goes
