= Land's Advocate of Holland =

Defunct political position in Holland

The Lands' Advocate (Dutch: landsadvocaat) of Holland acted as a legal adviser and secretary to the Estates of Holland. They also acted as leader and spokesman of the Holland deputies in the States-General, and negotiated with foreign ambassadors. The office started in the late 15th century and ended in 1630, following the death Johan van Oldenbarnevelt, when the title was renamed into Grand Pensionary.

They were the speaker of the nobility of Holland and had the first say on a subject during a meeting of the Estates. A decision of the Estates was made by a summarizing of all the statements of the other delegates by the Lands' Advocate. The Lands' Advocate of Holland was the most powerful man of the United Provinces when there was no Stadtholder in Holland (because two-thirds of the tax income of the republic came from the county of Holland). For the majority of its existence, Lands' Advocates would serve for life, though this would change to a five year term when the position was renamed.

The lands' advocates of Holland were considered influential people in Holland, at times as influential as the Stadtholder. In particular, the final Advocate, Johan van Oldenbarnevelt, who held the position from 1586 to 1619, acquired an almost complete control over every department of administration.
