= Grand pensionary =

Political office in the Dutch Republic (1588–1795)

The grand pensionary (Dutch: raadpensionaris) was the most important government official during the time of the Dutch Republic. In theory, a grand pensionary was merely a civil servant of the Estates of the dominant province, the County of Holland, among the Seven United Provinces. In practice, the grand pensionary of Holland was the political leader of the entire Dutch Republic when there was no stadtholder at the centre of power.

The position of the grand pensionary is not easily expressed in modern political terms but is sometimes compared to that of a prime minister. Fundamental differences are that a raadpensionaris had no fellow ministers, did not lead a ministry or department and had no head of state above him. Comparable seventeenth century functions are the French chief ministers such as Cardinal Richelieu or the Swedish chancellors such as Axel Oxenstierna.

== Etymology ==
Its Dutch name, raadpensionaris, can be literally translated as "councillor pensionary". A pensionary in general was a lawyer paid by a city council to advise them on a permanent basis. Because of the regular payments he was a pensionarius in mediaeval Latin. Such a person was called a stadsadvocaat in the Dutch language. The States of Holland and West-Friesland had a pensionary who was a council member, a raad, himself. He was, therefore, Raedt ende Pensionaris in seventeenth-century Dutch, which later was simplified to raadpensionaris or raadspensionaris. French diplomats referred to the raadpensionaris of Holland as the Grand-pensionnaire, to discern him from comparable officials in Dutch provinces of lesser importance. This embellishment was not used by the Dutch themselves. In English the French was translated as "Grand Pensionary". The Estates of the province of Zealand also had a raadpensionaris, which also could be referred to as a Grand Pensionary. The provinces of Groningen and Gelderland had a simple pensionaris. The provinces of Utrecht and Friesland had a landsadvocaat.

== History ==
The office started in 1619 and replaced the title of land's advocate. If the position of stadtholder of Holland was filled, then the grand pensionary was often the second leader of the Republic. Being the raadpensionaris of Holland, the grand pensionary acted as the chairman of States of Holland. He was appointed by the Estates but could also instantly be fired by the Estates. The city council of Dort, which was seen as the oldest city of Holland, had the right to nominate a new grand pensionary. When the grand pensionary was absent, he was temporarily replaced by the stadsadvocaat or pensionary of Dort. When a grand pensionary was appointed, an "instruction" was determined by the Estates defining his tasks and the limits of his powers. He was required to be a member of the Dutch Reformed Church and be well-versed in law, Dutch, Latin and French. He was appointed for five years at a time but could serve multiple consecutive terms. The grand pensionary also was the "Keeper of the Great Seal of Holland" and the "Registry Master of the Hollandic Fiefs" which added thousands of guilders to his yearly income.

Sessions of the Estates were ruled by a procedure that was very different from that of modern parliaments. No votes were held on some formal proposal and there was no round of debates. The grand pensionary controlled the agenda. He introduced a subject and then invited the members to state their opinions in the so-called omvraag ("enquiry"), which was done in a fixed order, reflecting the dates the cities they represented had been given city rights. At the end, the grand pensionary summarised each of the statements of the delegates, with an implicit conclusion about what collective decision had been made by this. Typically, this was recorded in a resolution. This way, if he was a competent man, he could control the entire decision-making process, especially as one of his duties was to represent the ten members of the nobility delegates—the ridderschap—in their usual absence and phrase at the start of the omvraag the single opinion they as a body had the right to express. In 1672, the Grand Pensionary became the official secretary of the ridderschap. The grand pensionary was obliged to strive for complete consensus among the members. If a city kept objecting to a certain solution, he was supposed to convince its members in separate meetings or no decision would be taken at all. For this purpose he was allowed to suspend or postpone sessions. The delegates could then consult their cities; they had no independent decision rights. Only in exceptional circumstances cities would be overruled by a majority opinion, the so-called overstemming; this happened e.g. in 1683 when stadholder William III forced Amsterdam to accept an increase of the military budget by threatening to instigate a popular revolt. Another example is the Act of Seclusion. On matters of sovereignty, religion or taxation complete unanimity was always required. Except for appointments, majority decisions were rarely useful: provincial bureaucracy was minimal and resolutions had to be enforced by the cities themselves. Cities would thus with impunity ignore resolutions they disagreed with. The office existed because all delegates of the States were, although ranked according to ancient feudal hierarchy, still basically equal and none among them could thus act as a head.

The grand pensionary also took care of the total correspondence of the Estates. He thus handled communications with lower administrative bodies, the other provinces of the Republic, the States General of the Netherlands, and foreign powers. This means his function combined elements of the duties performed by modern ministers of internal and foreign affairs. Letters to the Estates could be read by all the members. Therefore, messages of a more secretive nature, especially by diplomats, were sent to the grand pensionary personally. Large parts of the correspondence of the various grand pensionaries have been preserved, forming an important source of information for later historians. The diplomatic contacts of the Republic were in principle managed by the States General. However, they were ill-equipped to receive and entertain envoys with the pomposity needed in the seventeenth century to avoid offending foreign rulers. In practice, this was delegated to the court of the stadtholder of Holland, who also resided at The Hague. When no stadtholder was appointed, the grand pensionary received envoys. He was obliged to live at The Hague.

The grand pensionary had a complex relation with the States General. The States of Holland convened at 09:00 and 16:00; around noon he left to attend the nearby session of the States General and "direct" the delegation of Holland in its deliberations with the delegates of the other six provinces. He was not the president of the States-General, which function rotated between the provincial delegates on a weekly base. This was further complicated by a system of special commissions or besognes. Foreign relations, finances, the army and the navy e.g. each had a special commission, the members of which were selected from the States of Holland. The grand pensionary was obliged to attend the commission sessions and "prepare" their resolutions. However, the States General also had commissions on the same policy terrains that were attended by the grand pensionary as well. Often, their resolutions were copied verbatim from the Hollandic commission resolutions.

The Batavian Republic of 1795 first abolished the office but in the last year of the Batavian Commonwealth, 1805–1806, the title had to be reinstituted on orders of Napoleon as part of a number of measures to strengthen the executive power; Rutger Jan Schimmelpenninck thus functioned for a short time as the last grand pensionary. He officially functioned as a president of the entire Republic, not just of Holland. In June 1806, Carel de Vos van Steenwijk was for two weeks acting grand pensionary as part of a transitional arrangement.

The most famous and significant grand pensionary was Johan de Witt, who held the office between 1653 and 1672. Johan van Oldenbarnevelt, who played a crucial role in the Dutch struggle for independence equalled him in influence, though he held the position when it was still called land's advocate.

== See also ==
- List of grand pensionaries
