= Cattaneo family =

Genoese noble family

Cattaneo
- Albergo
- Current region: Italy
- Origin: Republic of Genoa
- Founded: 1309; 717 years ago

The House of Cattaneo (Italian: [katˈtaːneo]; Ligurian: Catànio [kaˈtani.u]) is a Genoese noble family, that had an important role in the history of the Republic of Genoa, giving five Doges to the Republic.

== Origins ==
In 1309 the Della Volta family, along with the families Mallone, Bustarino, Marchione, Stancone, Ingone, and Libertino formed the Albergo Cattaneo (first of these consortium institutions), thus putting this new surname before theirs. Its origin dates back to the mission of the very powerful Ingo della Volta as ambassador of Genoa in Pavia, in 1161. On this occasion he was appointed cattaneo ("captain", in old Italian).

A branch of the family moved to Naples, having one of its members as prince of San Nicandro in 1650.
The various families of the Albergo Cattaneo, after XIV century, on occasions when it was necessary to refer to the ancestors of the Cattaneo family, will always qualify by specifying the original surname of the family of origin.

In 1528, the following families remained to establish the Albergo "Cattaneo": Bava, Borrelli, Bozzoni, Canessa, Carizia, Cattaneo, Chiavari, Foglietta, Lagomarsino, Lasagna, Lazzari, Leccavela, Oliva, Pietra, Riccoboni, Stella, Tagliacarne, Vento, Zerbino.

== History ==
=== Albergo Cattaneo ===
With the reform of the 1528 of the Alberghi in Genoa, the Cattaneo went on to form the "XXII Albergo". In addition to those that were already part of it, many other families were ascribed to it. Below are the families who were registered at the Albergo Cattaneo:

- Bava: originally from Fossano, they came to Genoa around 1300 and were ascribed to the family in 1528.
- Borelli: originally from Savona.
- Bozomo: originally from Struppa, they were ascribed to the Cattaneo and Pinelli.
- Bufferi: originally from Genoa, they were one of the first families to be enrolled in the Albergo Cattaneo.
- Bustarini: originally from the Levante Riviera of Liguria, they formed one of the 74 Alberghi of 1414 and were ascribed to the Cattaneo in 1433.
- Carezza: originally from Albenga and were ascribed to the family in 1528.
- Chiavari: originally from Chiavari, they came to Genoa around 1150 and were ascribed to the Cattaneo, Lomellini and Lercaro in 1528.
- Dondi: originally from Piedmont and were ascribed to the family in 1528.
- Foglietta: originally from Sestri Levante and were ascribed to the Cattaneo in 1528.
- Ingoni: originally from Riviera Ligure, they came to Genoa around 1300 and were among the founders of the Albergo Cattaneo.
- Lagomarsino: originally from Recco and were ascribed to the family in 1528.
- Lasagna arrived in Genoa between the XII and XIII centuries and were ascribed to the family in 1528.
- De Lazario: originally from Bologna or from Bisagno Valley and were ascribed to the Cattaneo in 1528.
- Leccavela: initially ascribed to the Albergo Di Collone and later were ascribed to the Cattaneo and Lercaro in 1528.
- Libertini: originally from Genoa around 1100 and were ascribed to Doria, Cattaneo, Imperiale and Salvago.
- Maloni: originally from Quarto, they were one of the first families to be enrolled in the Albergo Cattaneo.
- Marchioni: originally from Gavi, they were among the founders of the Albergo Cattaneo.
- Oliva: they were ascribed to the Cattaneo and Grimaldi.
- Pietra: originally from Val Polcevera and were ascribed to the family in 1528.
- Riccobano: originally from Cinque Terre and were ascribed to the family in 1528.
- Scotti: originally from Genoa and were ascribed to the family in 1528.
- Stanconi: originally from Riviera Ligure, they came to Genoa around 1140.
- Stella: originally from the Ponente Riviera of Liguria and were ascribed to the Cattaneo in 1528.
- Tagliacarne originally from Lombardy and were ascribed to the Cattaneo in 1528.
- Vento originally from Benevento and were ascribed to the Cattaneo in 1528.
- De Volta were one of the founding families of Albergo Cattaneo in 1301.
- Zerbino originally from Chiavari and were ascribed to the Cattaneo in 1528.

== Notable members ==
- Gaspare Cattaneo della Volta, father of Simonetta Cattaneo Vespucci.
- Simonetta Cattaneo Vespucci (1453–1476)

=== Doges of the Republic of Genoa ===
- Oberto Cattaneo Lazzari (1473–1533), the 46th Doge of the Republic of Genoa.
- Leonardo Cattaneo della Volta (1487–1572), the 52nd Doge of the Republic of Genoa.
- Giovanni Battista Cattaneo Della Volta (1638–1721), the 131st Doge of the Republic of Genoa and king of Corsica.
- Nicolò Cattaneo Della Volta (1679–1751), the 153rd Doge of the Republic of Genoa and king of Corsica.
- Cesare Cattaneo Della Volta (1680–1756), the 159th Doge of the Republic of Genoa.

== See also ==
- Republic of Genoa
- Albergo
- Doge of Genoa
- Genoa

== Bibliography ==
- Scorza, Angelo M. G. (1924). Le famiglie nobili genovesi. Fratelli Frilli Editori.
