= Brignole =

Brignole is a surname. Notable people with the surname include:

- Angelo Brignole (1924–2006), Italian racing cyclist
- Dario Brignole (born 1968), sports and broadcasting agent based in the United States of America
- Giacomo Luigi Brignole (1797–1853), Catholic Cardinal and Camerlengo of the Sacred College of Cardinals
- Giacomo Maria Brignole (1724–1801), the 176th and 184th Doge of the Republic of Genoa
- Giuseppe Brignole (1703–1769), Genoese nobleman and father of Maria Caterina Brignole, Princess of Monaco
- Maria Caterina Brignole (1737–1813), Princess consort of Monaco by marriage to Honoré III, Prince of Monaco
- Maria Brignole Sale De Ferrari, Duchess of Galliera (1811–1888), Italian noblewoman and philanthropist
- Anna Pieri Brignole Sale (1765–1815), Sienese noble and court official

== See also ==
- Genova Brignole railway station, the second largest station of Genoa, northern Italy
- Brignole (Genoa Metro), metro station on the line 1 at Genoa
- Brignola
- Brignoles
- Brignoli
- Brignolia
