= Canevari =

Canevari is an Italian surname. Notable people with the surname include:

- Antonio Canevari (1681–1764), Italian architect
- Cesare Canevari (1927–2012), Italian actor, director and screenwriter
- Demetrio Canevari (1559–1625), Italian nobleman, son of Teramo
- Ottaviano Canevari (1565–1639), Italian nobleman, son of Teramo
- Paolo Canevari (born 1963), Italian artist
- Teramo Canevari (1511–1592), Italian nobleman
