= Battista Spinola =

Doge of Genoa (died 1539)

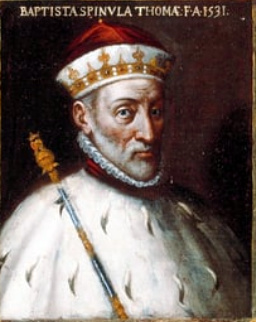

47th Doge of the Republic of Genoa
- In office January 4, 1531 – January 4, 1533
- Preceded by: Oberto Cattaneo Lazzari
- Succeeded by: Battista Lomellini

Personal details
- Born: 1472 Genoa, Republic of Genoa
- Died: 1539 (aged 66–67) Genoa, Republic of Genoa

Battista Spinola was the 47th Doge of Genoa. He was elected on January 4, 1531, and held office for two years. Battista was the father of Luca Spinola who was the 57th Doge of Genoa.

== Sources ==
- Malleson, George Bruce. Studies in Genoese History. p. 303
