= Dizionario Biografico degli Italiani =

Biographical dictionary of Italian people

- Subject: Biographies
- Genre: Reference Encyclopedia
- Publisher: Istituto dell'Enciclopedia Italiana
- Publication date: 1960–2020
- Publication place: Italy
- ISBN: 9788812000326
- OCLC: 883370

The Dizionario Biografico degli Italiani (English: Biographical Dictionary of the Italians) is a biographical dictionary published in 100 volumes by the Istituto dell'Enciclopedia Italiana, started in 1960 and completed in 2020. It includes about 40,000 biographies of distinguished Italians. The entries are signed by their authors and provide a rich bibliography.

== History ==
The work was conceived in 1925, to follow the model of similar works such as the German Allgemeine Deutsche Biographie (1912, 56 volumes) or the British Dictionary of National Biography (from 2004 the Oxford Dictionary of National Biography; 60 volumes). It is planned to include biographical entries on Italians who deserve to be preserved in history and who lived at any time during the long period from the fall of the Western Roman Empire to the present. As director of the Treccani, Giovanni Gentile entrusted the task of coordinating the work of drafting to Fortunato Pintor, who was soon joined by Arsenio Frugoni. In 1959 the direction was taken up by Alberto Maria Ghisalberti.

The first volume was published in 1960 to mark the 100th anniversary of the unification of Italy. It had taken about 15 years to organize a huge index of historical figures from which 40,000 were selected as Italians deserving to be remembered by a separate entry. In December 2020, the 100th and last volume appeared. Meanwhile updates were occasionally issued: for example, in 1990 a supplement was issued for the letters A-C containing entries of people who had died before 1985.

In October 2009, following the threatened closure of the work, or reduction to a simplified version that would only be maintained online, the publisher launched an appeal to ensure the continuation according to the strict scholarly criteria that had hitherto characterized the paper version.

In 2010 the list of planned items from the letters M to Z was published, for the purpose of their inclusion in the planned future volumes. Currently the director of the work is Raffaele Romanelli. In March 2011 a new portal was designed to access the dictionary, in conjunction with the online version of the Treccani Encyclopaedia. This was formally launched on the occasion of the 150th anniversary of Italy.

== Volumes ==
- 1: Aaron-Albertucci
- 2: Albicante-Ammannati
- 3: Ammirato-Arcoleo
- 4: Arconati-Bacaredda
- 5: Bacca-Baratta
- 6: Baratteri-Bartolozzi
- 7: Bartolucci-Bellotto
- 8: Bellucci-Beregan
- 9: Berengario-Biagini
- 10: Biagio-Boccaccio
- 11: Boccadibue-Bonetti
- 12: Bonfadini-Borrello
- 13: Borremans-Brancazolo
- 14: Branchi-Buffetti
- 15: Buffoli-Caccianemici
- 16: Caccianiga-Caluso
- 17: Calvart-Canefri
- 18: Canella-Cappello
- 19: Cappi-Cardona
- 20: Carducci-Carusi
- 21: Caruso-Castelnuovo
- 22: Castelvetro-Cavallotti
- 23: Cavallucci-Cerretesi
- 24: Cerreto-Chini
- 25: Chinzer-Cirni
- 26: Cironi-Collegno
- 27: Collenuccio-Confortini
- 28: Conforto-Cordero
- 29: Cordier-Corvo
- 30: Cosattini-Crispolto
- 31: Cristaldi-Dalla Nave
- 32: Dall'Anconata-Da Ronco
- 33: D'Asaro-De Foresta
- 34: Primo supplemento A-C
- 35: Indice A-C
- 36: De Fornari-Della Fonte
- 37: Della Fratta-Della Volpaia
- 38: Della Volpe-Denza
- 39: Deodato-Di Falco
- 40: Di Fausto-Donadoni
- 41: Donaggio-Dugnani
- 42: Dugoni-Enza
- 43: Enzo-Fabrizi
- 44: Fabron-Farina
- 45: Farinacci-Fedrigo
- 46: Feducci-Ferrerio
- 47: Ferrero-Filonardi
- 48: Filoni-Forghieri
- 49: Forino-Francesco da Serino
- 50: Francesco 1. Sforza-Gabbi
- 51: Gabbiani-Gamba
- 52: Gambacorta-Gelasio 2
- 53: Gelati-Ghisalberti
- 54: Ghiselli-Gimma
- 55: Ginammi-Giovanni da Crema
- 56: Giovanni Di Crescenzio-Giulietti
- 57: Giulini-Gonzaga
- 58: Gonzales-Graziani
- 59: Graziano-Grossi Gondi
- 60: Grosso-Guglielmo da Forli
- 61: Guglielmo Gonzaga-Jacobini
- 62: Iacobiti-Labriola
- 63: Labroca-Laterza
- 64: Latilla-Levi Montalcini
- 65: Levis-Lorenzetti
- 66: Lorenzetto-Macchetti
- 67: Macchi-Malaspina
- 68: Malatacca-Mangelli
- 69: Mangiabotti-Marconi
- 70: Marcora-Marsilio
- 71: Marsilli-Massimino da Salerno
- 72: Massimo-Mechetti
- 73: Meda-Messadaglia
- 74: Messi-Miraglia
- 75: Miranda-Montano
- 76: Montauti-Morlaiter
- 77: Morlini-Natolini
- 78: Natta-Nurra
- 79: Nursio-Ottolini Visconti
- 80: Ottone-Pansa
- 81: Pansini-Pazienza
- 82: Pazzi-Pia
- 83: Piacentini-Pio V
- 84: Piovene-Ponzo
- 85: Ponzone-Quercia
- 86: Querenghi-Rensi
- 87: Renzi-Robortello (2016)
- 88: Robusti-Roverella (2017)
- 89: Rovereto-Salvemini (2017)
- 90: Salvestrini-Saviozzo da Siena (2017)
- 91: Savoia-Semeria (2018)
- 92: Semino-Sisto IV (2018)
- 93: Sisto V-Stammati (2019)
- 94: Stampa-Tarantelli (2019)
- 95: Taranto-Togni (2019)
- 96: Toja-Trivelli (2019)
- 97: Trivulzio-Valeri (2020)
- 98: Valeriani-Verra (2020)
- 99: Verrazzano-Vittorio Amedeo (2020)
- 100:Vittorio Emanuele I-Zurlo (2020)
