= Michelangelo Cambiaso =

Doge of the Republic of Genoa

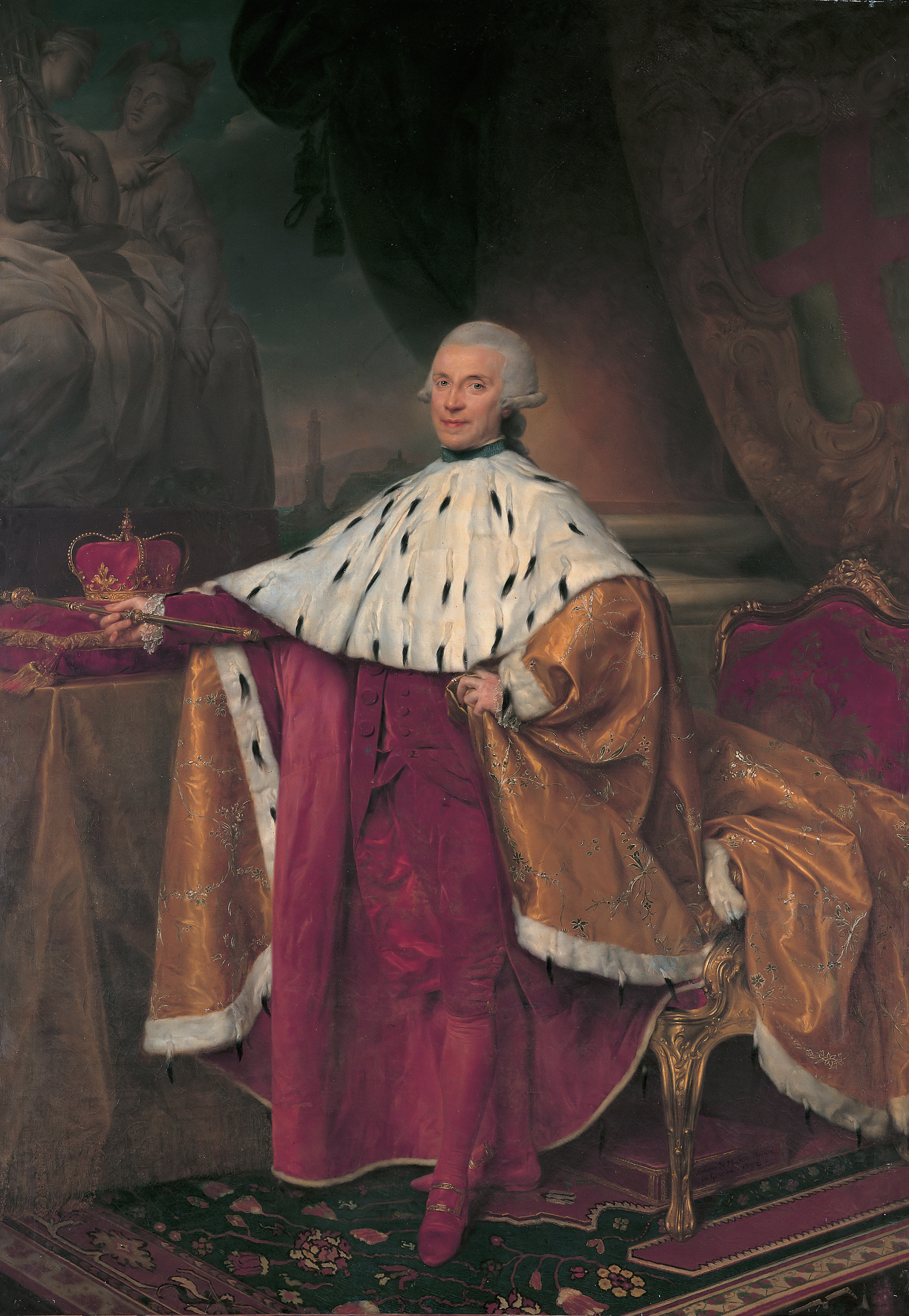
- Portrait by Anton von Maron c. 1792

182nd Doge of the Republic of Genoa
- In office 3 September 1791 – 3 September 1793
- Preceded by: Alerame Maria Pallavicini
- Succeeded by: Giuseppe Maria Doria

Personal details
- Born: 21 September 1738 Genoa, Republic of Genoa
- Died: 14 March 1813 (aged 74) Genoa, First French Empire

Michelangelo Cambiaso (Genoa, 21 September 1738 - Genoa, 14 March 1813) member of a Genoese patrician family, was a Genoese politician, as well as Doge of the Republic of Genoa and French senator under the First French Empire.

== Biography ==
Cambiaso was born in Genoa on 21 September 1738, the third son of Francesco Gaetano Cambiaso and his wife, the noblewoman Maria Caterina Tassorello. And graduated in the Sapienza University of Rome. On 3 September 1791 Michelangelo Cambiaso was elected the new doge of Genoa, the one hundred and thirty-seventh in two-year succession and the one hundred and eighty-second in republican history. The coronation took place in the first months of 1792 in the Genoa Cathedral.

The open and moderate attitude shown by the doge Michelangelo Cambiaso guaranteed for his entire mandate a relative social and political tranquility. The Republic of Genoa itself, with a formal and official deed dated 1 June 1792, proclaimed itself a "neutral" position towards France and managed to maintain this neutral status even when, between August and December of the same year, refused an agreed French occupation of the Port of Savona in order, according to the French, to avoid hypothetical and same military action in the Ligurian territories by the Austro-Sardinian armies. A neutrality, strongly desired by the Senate of the Republic and by the Doge Cambiaso himself. As per natural customs deadline, his Doge's mandate ended on 3 September 1793.

Between 5 and 6 June 1797, as representative of the small council of the Republic of Genoa, he signed a secret agreement with Napoleon, between the French Republic and the Republic of Genoa, in Montebello della Battaglia. A new government commission was established and, although in the majority made up of pro-French members, Michelangelo Cambiaso was also part of it as maire (mayor) of the municipality of Genoa. With this charge he welcomed General Napoleon Bonaparte to the door of San Tommaso on 30 June 1805. After spending almost two years in Paris, in November 1807 he returned to Genoa, where he was joined by the appointment Count of the First French Empire, and by the subsequent decoration was awarded the Order of the Reunion by Napoleon himself. Cambiaso died in Genoa in 1813.

== See also ==
- Republic of Genoa
- Doge of Genoa
