= Stefano Durazzo (Doge of Genoa) =

Doge of the Republic of Genoa and king of Corsica

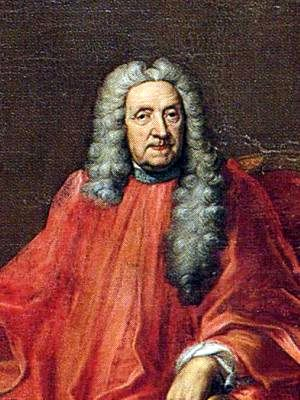

152nd Doge of the Republic of Genoa
- In office 3 February 1734 – 3 February 1736
- Preceded by: Domenico Maria Spinola
- Succeeded by: Nicolò Cattaneo Della Volta

Personal details
- Born: 1668 Genoa, Republic of Genoa
- Died: 24 January 1744 (aged 75–76) Genoa, Republic of Genoa

Stefano Durazzo (Genoa, 1668 - Genoa, 24 January 1744) was the 152nd Doge of the Republic of Genoa and king of Corsica.

== Biography ==
Son of Pietro Durazzo, doge of Genoa in the two years 1685–1687, and his wife, Violante Garbarino, he was born in the Genoese capital in 1668. Compared to other noble representatives, Stefano Durazzo, in fact, did not deal much with public life and even his biennial Dogate was somewhat uninfluential or almost "ordinary administration". On 3 February 1736, his Dogate ended, but he continued to serve the Republic as head of the Magistrate of War, and state inquisitor. Durazzo died in Genoa on 24 January 1744.

== See also ==
- Republic of Genoa
- Doge of Genoa
