= Giuseppe Maria Doria =

Doge of the Republic of Genoa

183rd Doge of the Republic of Genoa
- In office 16 September 1793 – 16 September 1795
- Preceded by: Michelangelo Cambiaso
- Succeeded by: Giacomo Maria Brignole

Personal details
- Born: 12 July 1730 Genoa, Republic of Genoa
- Died: 9 March 1816 (aged 85) Rome, Papal States

Giuseppe Maria Doria (12 July 1730 – 9 March 1816) was a Genoese nobleman, elected 183rd Doge of the Republic of Genoa. He was the last member of the house Doria to serve in that office.

== Bibliography ==
- Buonadonna, Sergio; Marcenaro, Mario (2007). Rosso doge. I dogi della Repubblica di Genova dal 1339 al 1797 [The Doges of the Republic of Genoa from 1339 to 1797] (in Italian). Genoa: De Ferrari Editori. ISBN 9788871722528.

Preceded by Michelangelo Cambiaso	Doge of Genoa; 1793-1795	Succeeded by Giacomo Maria Brignole
