= Frugone =

Frugone is a surname. Notable people with the surname include:

- Jim Frugone (1897–1972), American football player
- Marie Frugone (1889-1953), American journalist and Red Cross nurse
- Pedro Frugone, Chilean musician

== See also ==
- Frugoni
