= Giulio Negrone =

Italian scholar (1553–1625)

- Born: 1553; Genoa, Republic of Genoa
- Died: 17 January 1625; Milan, Duchy of Milan
- Other name: Panfilo Landi
- Occupations: Jesuit priest Renaissance humanist University teacher

Giulio Negrone or Iulius Nigronius (1553-1625) was a Jesuit humanist orator and scholar, who also wrote under the name Panfilo Landi.

== Biography ==
Born in Genoa in 1553, he joined the Society of Jesus in 1571. As Rector of the Accademia Partenia of Rome, he wrote a treatise on the chain impresa of the academy, emphasising its Neoplatonic and Christian connotations. He was a professor of rhetoric, philosophy and theology at Milan and Genoa, afterwards serving as rector of the Verona, Genova and Cremona colleges. Among his pupils was the future Cardinal Odoardo Farnese. He undertook with Claudio Acquaviva's approbation a copious ascetical commentary on the Common Rules (Regulae Communes Societatis Iesu), published in Milan in 1613. A staunch Ciceronian, Negrone was the author of a number of rhetorical works. He died in Milan in 1625.

== Works ==
Benoît Baudouin, Calceus antiquus et mysticus; Giulio Negroni, De caliga veterum. Amstelodami, sumpt. A. Frisii, 1667

- Impresa dell'accademia Partenia di Roma. Rome: Luigi Zannetti. 1594.
- Argumentum Academici Clypei. Genua.1605.
- Orationes XXV. Milan. 1608.
- Regulæ communes Societatis Jesu, commentariis asceticis illustratæ. Milan. 1613.
- Dissertatio subseciva de caliga veterum. Dillingen: Ulrich Rem. 1621.
- Tractatus ascetici, 5 vols. Milan. 1621-1623.
- Pars postrema asceticorum tractatuum. Milan. 1625.
- Dissertatio moralis de librorum amatoriorum lectione junioribus maxime vitanda. Milan. 1622.
