= Garbarino =

Garbarino is a surname of Italian origin. Notable people with the surname include:

- Andrew Garbarino (born 1984), American attorney and politician
- Francesco Garbarino (1607–1672), Doge of Genoa and king of Corsica
- Henri Garbarino, Canadian football player
- James Garbarino, American psychologist
- Steve Garbarino, American journalist
