= Teramo Canevari =

Italian nobleman, merchant, notary, and treasurer of the Republic of Genoa

Personal details
- Born: 1511 Genoa
- Died: 1592 (aged 80–81) Genoa
- Occupation: Trader
- Profession: Legal

Teramo Canevari (1511–1592) was an Italian nobleman, merchant, notary, and treasurer of the Republic of Genoa.

== Biography ==
Teramo was the son of Matteo Canevari (a merchant of silk industry). His wife was Pellegrina Borsona, and were parents of Demetrio Canevari, Giovanni Matteo and Ottaviano Canevari.

The origin of the Canevaro family is linked to Demetrio Scordigli (also recorded as Scordari), born in 1441, son of Leonello and Raffo (or Raffaele), and belonging to the noble lineage of the Scordilli family of the Aegean Archipelago. The branch of the Canevaro family that later produced Domenico Doge of the Republic of Genoa had become extinct in the male line in the early 16th century, surviving only in Orsola, daughter of Matteo Canevaro, who was its sole heiress. She married Demetrio Scordigli, and in their son Matteo (d. 1557), the maternal surname Canevaro was deliberately substituted for that of the father in order to preserve the family name. From that point onward, all their descendants bore the surname Canevaro. From Matteo (†1557), the lineage continued through successive generations: Teramo, Giovan Battista (b. 1603), Nicolò (b. 1649), and Domenico (b. 1683).
