= Canevaro =

Canevaro is a surname. Notable people with the surname include:

- César Canevaro (1846–1922), Peruvian soldier and politician
- Domenico Canevaro (1683–1745), Italian politician
- Felice Napoleone Canevaro (1838–1926), Italian admiral and politician

== See also ==
- Canevari
- Sergio Canavero (born 1964), Italian neurosurgeon
