= Frugoni =

Surname list

Frugoni is a surname originating in Italy. Notable people with the surname include:

- Arsenio Frugoni (1914–1970), Italian historian
- Carlo Innocenzo Frugoni (1692–1768), Italian poet and librettist
- Chiara Frugoni (1940–2022), Italian historian
- Gian Bernardo Frugoni (1591–1661), Genoese doge
- Emilio Frugoni (1880–1969), Uruguayan politician
- Pietro Frugoni (1851–1940), Italian general
- Ramiro Martínez (rugby union) (born 1970), Argentine-born rugby union player, also known as Ramiro Martinez-Frugoni
