= Simone Facchinetti =

Italian art historian

Simone Facchinetti (born 1972) is an Italian art historian.

== Biography ==
Born in Bergamo, he graduated from Milan University in modern art history in 2000. He then studied for a doctorate on Roberto Longhi's Carlo Braccesco, editing the critical edition of Braccesco's work, published in 2008. In 2002 he won the Premio Internazionale Sergio Polillo.

He was curator of the Museo Adriano Bernareggi in Bergamo from 2000 to 2018 and from 2019 onwards has taught art history at Salento University. He has also co-curated two exhibitions at London's Royal Academy of Arts (that on Giovan Battista Moroni in 2014, revived at the Frick Collection in 2019 as Moroni. The Riches of Renaissance Portraiture, along with In the Age of Giorgione in 2016). He has also collaborated with Alias-D on il manifesto and with "Il Giornale dell'Arte".

== Works ==
- MANTEGNA E IL RINASCIMENTO IN VALPADANA - GRANDI MAESTRI DELL'ARTE. Il sole 24 ore. 2007.
- Da Bergognone a Tiepolo. Scoperte e restauri in provincia di Bergamo. Silvana. 2002. ISBN 978-88-8215-502-5.
- Giovan Battista Moroni. Lo sguardo sulla realtà (1560-1579). Silvana. 2004. ISBN 978-88-8215-811-8.
- Fermo Stella da Caravaggio. Fondazione Adriano Bernareggi. 2008. ISBN 978-88-941621-0-3.
- Gianriccardo Piccoli. Mondadori Electa. 2011.
- Carlo Ceresa. Un pittore del Seicento lombardo tra realtà e devozione- exhibition catalogue (Bergamo, 10 March - 24 June 2012). Bergamo: Silvana. 2012.
- Giovanni Frangi. Lotteria farnese. Silvana. 2015.
- Chiara Frugoni and Simone Facchinetti, Senza misericordia. Il Trionfo della Morte e la Danza macabra a Clusone (Einaudi: Torino, 2016), ISBN 978-88-06-22479-0
- Storie e segreti dal mercato dell'arte. Il Mulino. 2019.
- Terra di confine. Arti figurative a Bergamo nel Rinascimento (e oltre). Officina Libraria. 2019. ISBN 88-336-7067-8.
