= Oberto Cattaneo Lazzari =

Doge of the Republic of Genoa

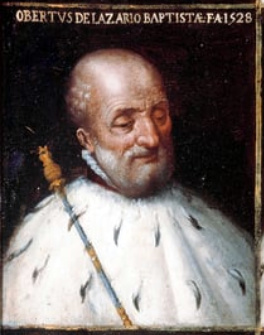

46th Doge of the Republic of Genoa
- In office 11 October 1528 – 11 October 1530
- Preceded by: Antoniotto II Adorno
- Succeeded by: Battista Spinola

Personal details
- Born: 1473 Genoa, Republic of Genoa
- Died: 10 December 1533 (aged 59–60) Genoa, Republic of Genoa

Oberto Cattaneo Lazzari (1473 in Genoa – 10 December 1533 in Genoa) was the 46th Doge of the Republic of Genoa, the first with a two-year mandate.

== Biography ==
Elected on 11 October 1528, he worked immediately for the development of the port of Genoa, with reinforcement works, and the various appointments of the respective captains of the Genoese galleys. Historical sources of the time testified with great solemnity, among others, the appointment of Admiral Filippino Doria, which took place on 24 April 1529, with the delivery of the ancient banner of San Giorgio after the solemn Mass inside the Cathedral of San Lorenzo.

On 12 October 1530, upon the effective expiry of the mandate, theoretically ceased any activity of institutional power, but at the request of the Twelve Reformers, he actually held the position until the appointment of his successor, which took place on 4 January with the election of Battista Spinola. Oberto Cattaneo Lazzari died in Genoa on 10 December 1533 and was buried in the church of San Domenico.

== See also ==
- Republic of Genoa
- Doge of Genoa
