= Kaijin. L'ombra di cenere =

2018 novel by Linda Lercari

Kaijin – L`ombra di cenere
- Author: Linda Lercari
- Language: Italian
- Genre: History
- Publisher: Idrovolante Edizioni
- Publication date: 2018
- Publication place: Italy
- Media type: Print (hardcover)

Kaijin. L'ombra di cenere is a 2018 historical novel, the most famous by Italian author Linda Lercari. Set in Japan during the Kamakura period in 1330, the plot revolves around Momokushi, a samurai who listen the words that his faithful samurai student Haka mutters on his deathbed. What Haka says is an enigma and become a worm that gnaws at the mind of his lord. In search of clues that can shed light on the mystery, Momokushi retraces the history of friendship with his friend and warrior, digging into the past and visiting the places that witnessed their youthful exploits. But what Haka has kept hidden for over fifty years is not only a secret capable of upsetting a life, but also the most poignant declaration of love that a human being can leave as a gift.

To write Kaijin. L'ombra di cenere Lercari spent four years, part of which she looked for materials and even asked to her many Japanese friends. It wasn't easy write this story for Linda, but the thing she most wanted to avoid were anachronisms, and she believes she succeeded about this.

In September 2026, Kaijin. L'ombra di cenere became the most sold book in Amazon about the topic History of Japan.

== Style and themes ==
Kaijin. L'ombra di cenere is a historical novel and an example of Japanese fiction and samurai fiction. Lercari explain to the readers that Hakashinjitsu is the terrible samurai, the demon, the shadow of his lord Momokushi sama. Haka was born in a peasant village and was a pariah, an outcast. His peers had tried to kill him several times and during the last ambush they were interrupted by the young lord of the castle who had taken Haka with him to make him a valiant warrior. Haka's gratitude will be such that he will become a terrible fighter and the Momo shadow. Any problem, any unexpected event, everything possible was resolved without the lord of the castle almost having to think about it. Haka and Momo, two halves of a perfect gear. The lord in command and the demon in service: invincible. Yet in this perfect symbiosis there is a shadow, a secret never revealed, a worm that only Haka's death could reveal.

== Reception and influence ==
Fabio Abate da Zena praised Linda Lercari’s handling of the novel’s tone and intensity, describing it as a noteworthy addition to a collection of short stories.

== Awards ==
- Deruta Book Fest
  - 2022: 1st place for published novel
- San Domenichino di Massa literary award
  - 2023: 3rd place
- Amori sui generis, Grosseto
  - 2022: Finalist
- Premio Argentario
  - 2022: Finalist
