= Ottaviano Canevari =

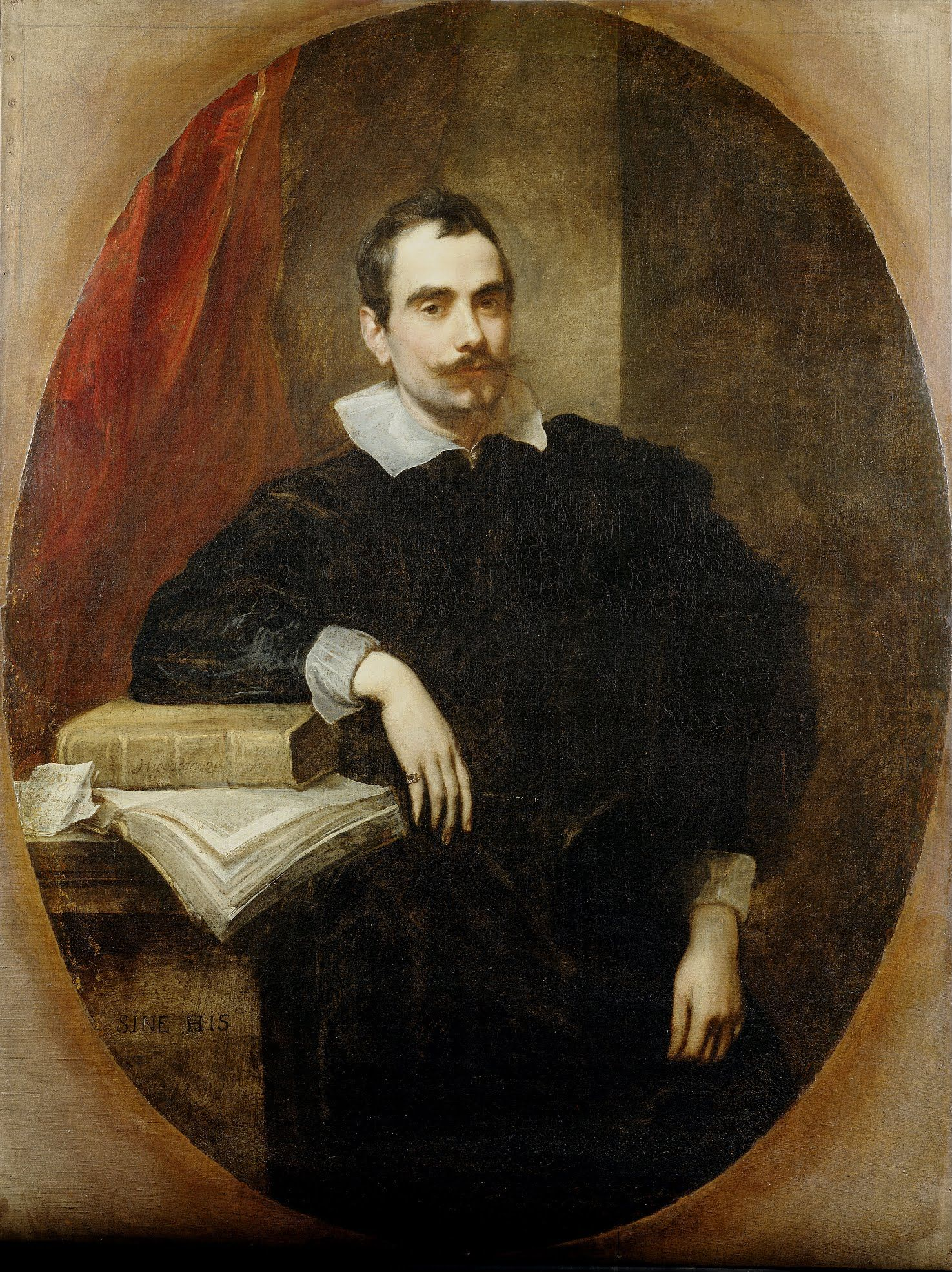
- Ottaviano Canevari by Anthony van Dyck

Senator of the Republic of Genoa

Personal details
- Born: 1565 Genoa
- Died: 1639 (aged 73–74) Genoa
- Occupation: Politician
- Profession: Jurist

Ottaviano Canevari (1565-1639) was an Italian nobleman, Doctor of law, Magistrate and Senator of The Republic of Genoa.

== Biography ==
Ottaviano was the son of Teramo Canevari (treasurer 1511–1592), and brother of Demetrio Canevari (physician, 1559–1625). Canevari studied in the Jesuit College of Brera in Milan, and was graduated in the same establishment, in 1584.
