= Negrone (surname) =

Negrone is a surname. Notable people with the surname include:

- Battista Negrone (1530–1592), 77th Doge of the Republic of Genoa
- Bendinelli Negrone (1627–1707), 133rd Doge of the Republic of Genoa and King of Corsica, Cyprus and Jerusalem
- Carina Massone Negrone (1911–1991), Italian aviator
- Domenico Negrone (1672–1736), 147th Doge of the Republic of Genoa and king of Corsica
- Giovanni Battista Negrone (1714–1771), 77th Doge of the Republic of Genoa
- Giulio Negrone (1553–1625), Jesuit humanist orator and scholar
- Pietro Negrone (c. 1505 – 1565), Italian painter of the Renaissance period

== See also ==
- Negrone
- Negroni (surname)
