= Lercari =

Lercari is an Italian surname. Notable people with the surname include:

- Giovanni Battista Lercari (1507–1592), Doge of Genoa 1563–1565
- Giovanni Battista Lercari (1576–1657), Doge of Genoa 1642–1644
- Francesco Maria Imperiale Lercari (1629–1712), Doge of Genoa 1683–1685
- Caterina Imperiale Lercari Pallavicini (fl. 1721), Neo-Latin poet
- Giovanni Lercari (1722–1802), Italian Catholic Archbishop
- Niccolò Maria Lercari, Cardinal Secretary of State in Vatican City 1726–1730
- Linda Lercari (born 1972), Italian writer
