= Salvatore Settis =

Italian archaeologist and art historian (born 1941)

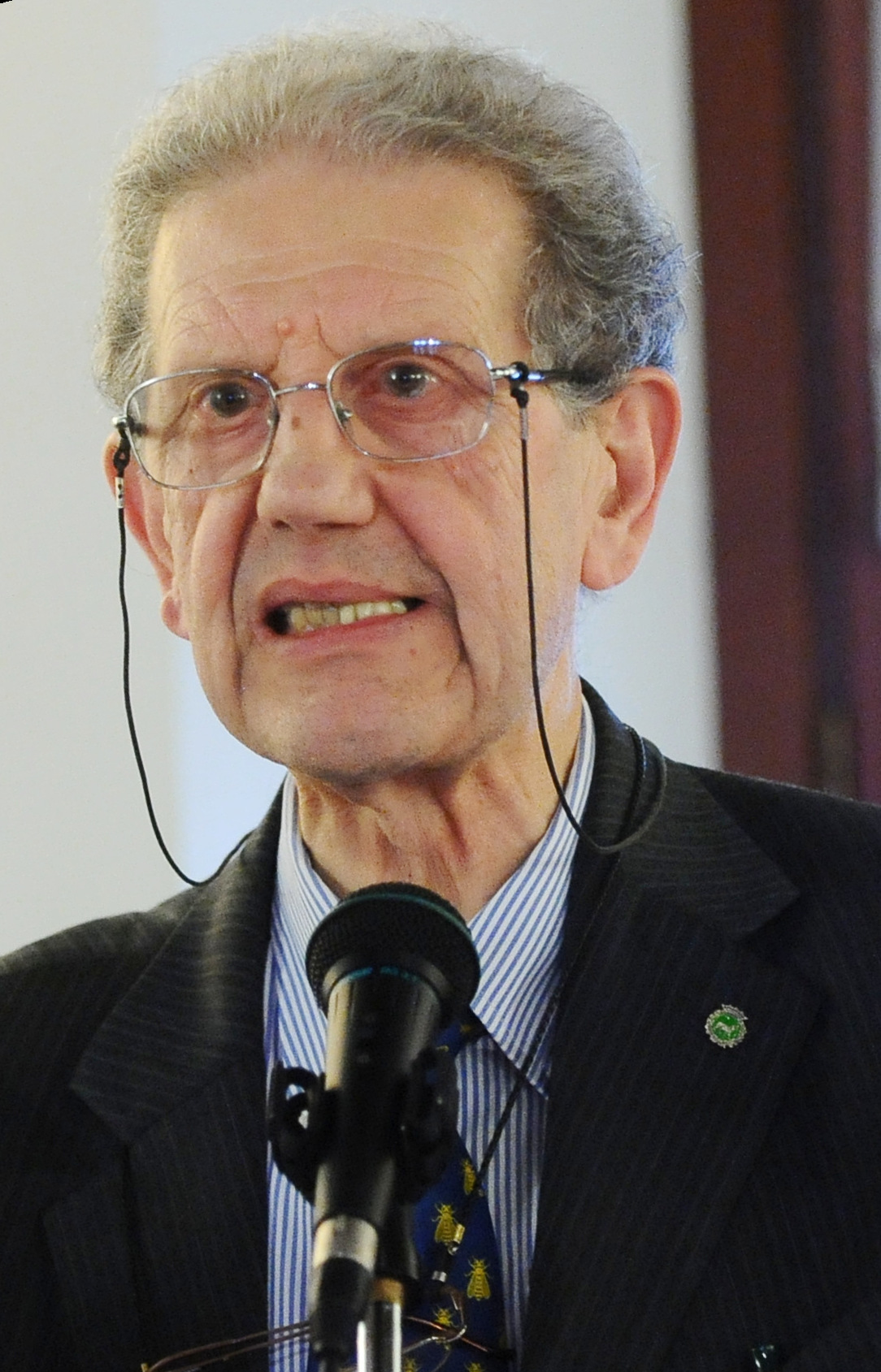
- Settis in 2013
- Born: 11 June 1941 (age 84); Rosarno, Province of Reggio Calabria, Italy
- Occupations: Archaeologist; art historian

Salvatore Settis (born 11 June 1941) is an Italian archaeologist and art historian. From 1994 to 1999 he was director of the Getty Center for the History of Art and the Humanities in Los Angeles and from 1999 to 2010 of the Scuola Normale Superiore in Pisa.

Since 2010 he has been honorary president of the Associazione Culturale Silvia Dell'Orso. He is also a member of the Deutsches Archäologisches Institut, the American Academy of Arts and Sciences, the Accademia Nazionale dei Lincei, the Accademia delle Arti del Disegno, the Comitato scientifico of the European Research Council, and the American Philosophical Society.

== Personal life and education ==
Born in Rosarno, he graduated in classical archaeology from the University of Pisa as a student of the Scuola Normale Superiore of Pisa in 1963. He married Chiara Frugoni in 1965, with whom he had three children.

== Career ==
=== Getty Center ===
Settis, who was known as a scholar of ancient and Renaissance art, was a Getty consultant and scholar before joining the staff of the Getty Center in Los Angeles, California, in 1994. He was appointed director in March 1993, to replace the founder Kurt Forster, who resigned in 1992. Settis left that position in January 1999, announcing that he would return to his former position as a professor of classical archaeology at the Scuola Normale Superiore.

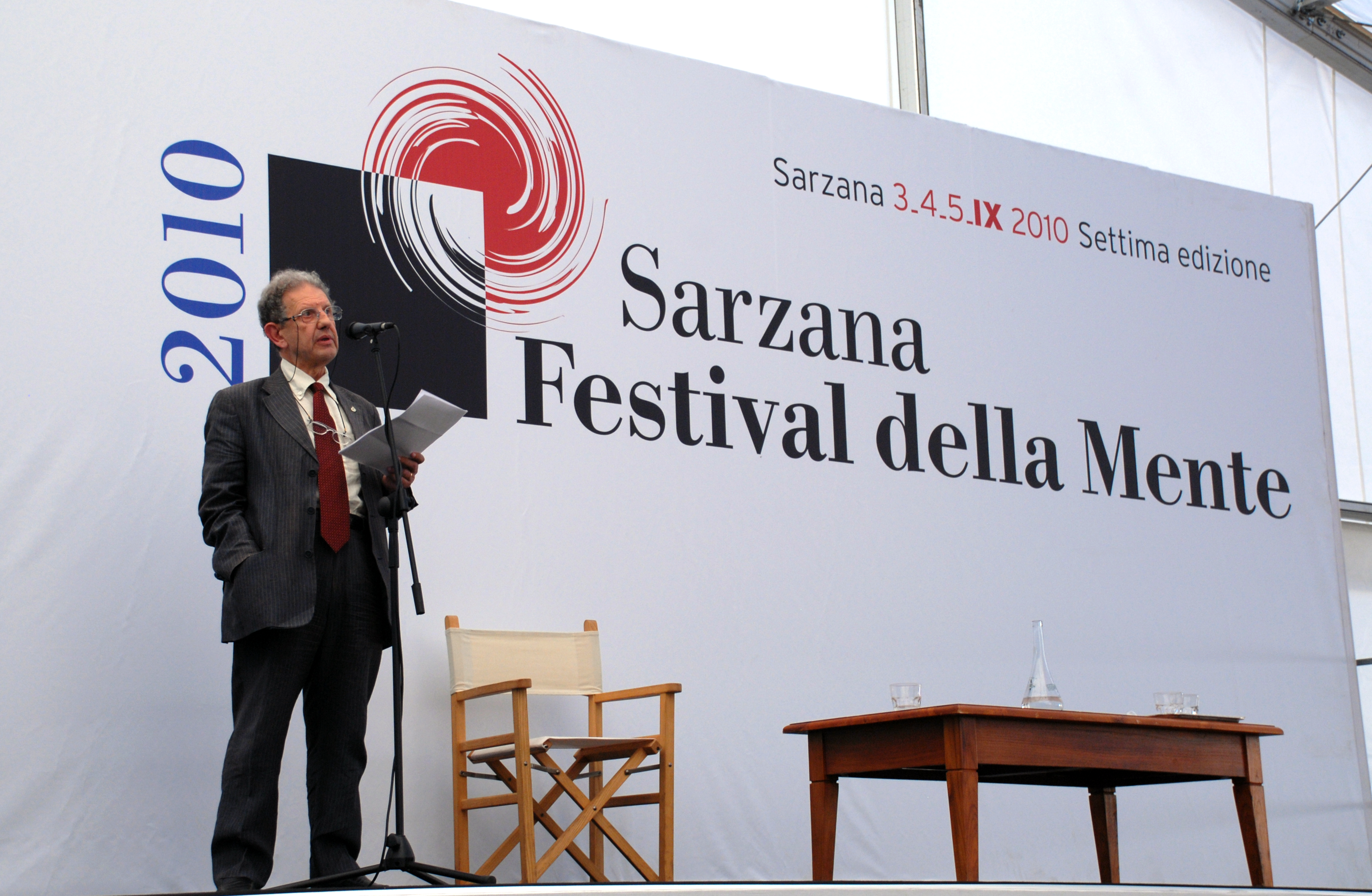
Salvatore Settis at the Festival della Mente in Sarzana

== Honours ==
- 2001: A. W. Mellon Lectures in the Fine Arts

== Works ==
- La "Tempesta" interpretata. Giorgione, i committenti, il soggetto, Torino, Einaudi, 1978.
- Settis-La Regina-Agosti-Farinella, La Colonna Traiana, Collana Saggi n. 716, Torino, Einaudi, 1988.
- Laocoonte. Fama e stile, Collana Virgolette, Roma, Donzelli 1999. ISBN 978-88-603-6040-3.
- Italia S.p.A. L'assalto al patrimonio culturale, Collana Gli struzzi n. 554, Torino, Einaudi, 2002
- Passaggi e paesaggi (with Saverio Calocero), Roma, Donzelli, 2003
- Quale eccellenza? Intervista sulla Normale di Pisa (edited by Silvia Dell'Orso), Collana Saggi Tascabili, Roma-Bari, Laterza, 2004. ISBN 978-88-420-6974-4.
- Futuro del "classico". Torino: Einaudi. 2004. ISBN 978-88-061-4380-0.
- Battaglie senza eroi. I beni culturali tra istituzioni e profitto, Electa, Milano, 2005.
- (editor) Memoria dell'antico nell'arte italiana, Einaudi, Torino.
- Iconografia dell'arte italiana 1100-1500: una linea, Collana Piccola Biblioteca, Torino, Einaudi, 2005.
- Artemidoro. Un papiro dal I secolo al XXI secolo (Collana Saggi). Torino: Einaudi. 2008. ISBN 978-88-061-9671-4.
- La villa di Livia. Le pareti ingannevoli, Mondadori Electa, Milano, 2008.
- Artisti e committenti fra Quattro e Cinquecento, Postfazione di Antonio Pinelli, Collana Piccola Biblioteca, Torino, Einaudi, 2010.
- Paesaggio Costituzione cemento. La battaglia per l'ambiente contro il degrado civile, Torino, Einaudi, 2010.
- Azione Popolare. Cittadini per il bene comune, Torino, Einaudi, 2012.
- Il paesaggio come bene comune (Collana Assise. Quaedam ed.). La Scuola di Pitagora. 2013. ISBN 978-88-654-2231-1.
- (presentazione di) Il cammino della Comunità, Roma, Edizioni di Comunità, 2013.
- Se Venezia muore, Collana Vele, Torino, Einaudi, 2014. ISBN 978-88-062-1826-3.
- Costituzione! Perché attuarla è meglio che cambiarla, Torino, Einaudi, 2016. ISBN 978-88-062-3071-5.
- Architettura e democrazia. Paesaggio, città, diritti civili, Torino, Einaudi, 2017.
- Cieli d'Europa. Cultura, creatività, uguaglianza, UTET, 2017.

=== As editor ===
- Memoria dell'antico nell'arte italiana (Collana Grandi Opere). Torino: Einaudi. 1984. ISBN 978-88-065-7844-2.
- Civiltà dei Romani, Electa, Milano, 1990–1993.
- I Greci. Storia, cultura, arte, società, Torino, Einaudi, 1996–2002.
