= Demetrio Canevari =

Italian nobleman, doctor and bibliophile

- Archiatra pontificio of the Papal States
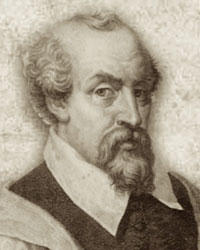
- Born: March 9, 1559; Republic of Genoa
- Died: 1625 (aged 65–66); Rome
- Buried: Santa Maria di Castello
- Occupation: Physician

Demetrio Canevari (1559-1625) was an Italian nobleman, doctor and bibliophile. He served as physician of Pope Urban VIII.

== Biography ==
Demetrio was born in Liguria, was the son of Teramo Canevari, a wealthy merchant and lawyer, and Pellegrina Borsona, belonging to a distinguished family. He had two brothers Matteo and Ottaviano Canevari, who were dedicated to trade and the laws.

Canevari made his studies first in Pavia and then in Rome. He was graduated in medicine on April 7, 1581, in Genoa. He returned to Rome in 1581, where was member of the papal court and became the personal doctor of the Pope and his courtiers. In Rome he performed the functions in the art of medicine by forty years.

Canevari has authored several books of natural philosophy and medicine. His works include De ligno sancto commentarium (1602), Ars medica seu Curandorum morborum (1625), De primis rerum natura factarum principiis commentarius: (1626), and Morborum Omnium Qui Corpus Humanum Affligunt, Vt Decet, & Ex Arte Curandorum Accurata, & Plenissima Methodus (1626).

His paternal great-grandfather was Leonino Scordari, a trader with connections in Constantinople. He was born in the city of Genova, but possibly of Greek origin. Canevari died on September 22, 1625, in Rome. His remains were transported to Genoa, buried in Santa Maria di Castello, place where it has also been buried its ancestor Matteo Canevari.
