= Nicolò Cattaneo Della Volta =

Doge of the Republic of Genoa and king of Corsica

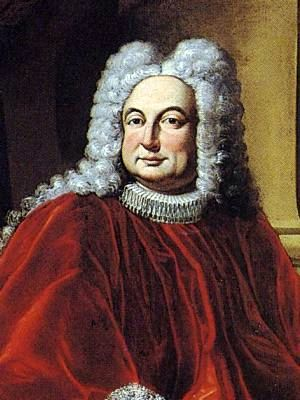

153rd Doge of the Republic of Genoa
- In office February 7, 1736 – February 7, 1738
- Preceded by: Stefano Durazzo
- Succeeded by: Costantino Balbi

Personal details
- Born: 1679 Genoa, Republic of Genoa
- Died: 1751 (aged 71–72) Genoa, Republic of Genoa

Nicolò Cattaneo Della Volta (Genoa, 18 July 1679 - Genoa, 5 July 1751) was the 153rd Doge of the Republic of Genoa and king of Corsica.

== Biography ==
On February 7, 1736 he was elected the new Doge of the Republic, the one hundred and eighth with a two year mandate and the one hundred and fifty-third in republican history. As doge he was also invested with the related biennial office of King of Corsica. His Dogate was inevitably dominated by the Corsican Crisis. His two-year mandate ended, on February 7, 1738, after which he assumed the position of deputy of the Tax office of the Republic of Genoa.

Nicolò Cattaneo Della Volta died in Genoa on 5 July 1751.

== See also ==
- Republic of Genoa
- Doge of Genoa
