= Republic of Genoa =

Italian maritime republic (1099–1797)

Republic of Genoa: Repúbrica de Zêna (Ligurian); Repubblica di Genova (Italian); Res Publica Ianuensis (Latin)
- 1099–1797; 1814–1815
- Flag Coat of arms
- Motto: Respublica superiorem non recognoscens (Latin for 'Republic that recognizes [lit. 'recognizing'] no superior')
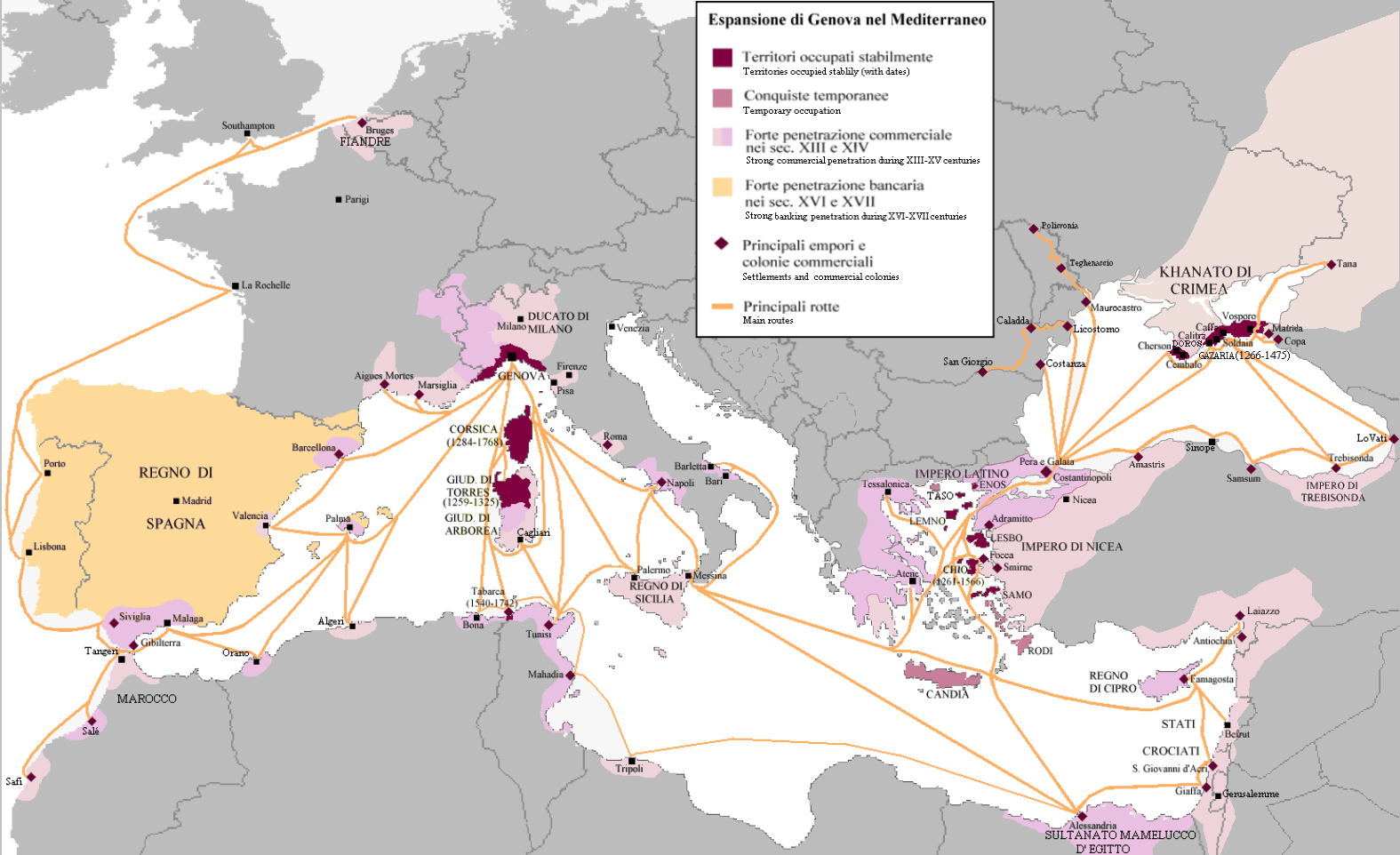
- The Republic of Genoa and its colonies in the Mediterranean and the Black Sea (shown in purple)
- Capital and largest city: Genoa; 44°24′27″N 08°56′00″E
- Official languages: Genoese; Latin; Italian (Note: Corsican, Greek and Arabic were also spoken in the colonies of the Republic)
- Religion: Roman Catholicism
- Government: Merchant republic
- Doge
  - 1339–1345: Simone Boccanegra (first)
  - 1795–1797: Giacomo Maria Brignole (last)
- Capitano del popolo
  - 1257–1262: Guglielmo Boccanegra (first)
  - 1335–1339: Galeotto Spinola (last)
- Podestà
  - 1191–1191: Manegoldo del Tettuccio (first)
  - 1256–1256: Filippo della Torre (last)
- Legislature: Consiglio della Repubblica (since 1528)
  - Upper chamber: Great Council
  - Lower chamber: Minor Council
- Historical era: Middle Ages; Early modern Europe
  - Established: 1099
  - Participation in the First Crusade: 1096–1099
  - Treaty of Nymphaeum: 1261
  - Establishment of the Gazaria: 1266
  - Creation of the dogate: 1339
  - Foundation of the Bank of Saint George: 1407
  - Andrea Doria's new constitution: 1528
  - Disestablished: June 14, 1797
  - Republic's revival: 1814
  - Disestablished: 1815

Population
  - Estimate: 650,000 in the early 17th century
- Currency: Genoese lira (1138–1797); Genovino (1252–1415)
Preceded by
Kingdom of Italy (Holy Roman Empire)
Succeeded by
1797: Ligurian Republic
1815: Kingdom of Sardinia
∟Duchy of Genoa

The Republic of Genoa (Note: (Ligurian: Repúbrica de Zêna [ɾeˈpybɾika de ˈzeːna]; Italian: Repubblica di Genova; Latin: Res Publica Ianuensis)) was a medieval and early modern maritime republic from the years 1099 to 1797 in Liguria on the northwestern Italian coast. During the Late Middle Ages, it was a major commercial power in both the Mediterranean and Black Sea. Between the 16th and 17th centuries, it was one of the major financial centres of Europe.

Throughout its history, the Genoese Republic established numerous colonies throughout the Mediterranean and the Black Sea, including Corsica from 1347 to 1768, Monaco, Southern Crimea from 1266 to 1475, and the islands of Lesbos and Chios from the 14th century to 1462 and 1566, respectively. With the arrival of the early modern period, the Republic had lost many of its colonies, and shifted its focus to banking. This was successful for Genoa, which remained a hub of capitalism, with highly developed banks and trading companies. The republic became a long lasting partner to the Spanish Empire, leading to a global expansion of its activity.

Genoa was known as la Superba ('the Superb One'), la Dominante ('The Dominant One'), la Dominante dei mari ('the Dominant of the Seas'), and la Repubblica dei magnifici ('the Republic of the Magnificents'). From the 11th century to 1528, it was officially known as the Compagna Communis Ianuensis and from 1580 as the Serenìscima Repùbrica de Zêna ('Most Serene Republic of Genoa'). From 1339 until the state's extinction in 1797, the ruler of the republic was the doge, originally elected for life, after 1528 elected for terms of two years; in practice, the republic was an oligarchy ruled by a small group of merchant families, from whom the doges were selected.

The Genoese navy played a fundamental role in the wealth and power of the Republic over the centuries and its importance was recognized throughout Europe. To this day, its legacy as a key factor in the triumph of the Genoese Republic is still recognized, and its coat of arms is depicted in the flag of the Italian Navy. In 1284, Genoa fought victoriously against the Republic of Pisa in the Battle of Meloria for dominance over the Tyrrhenian Sea, and it was an eternal rival of Venice for dominance in the Mediterranean as a whole.

The republic began when Genoa became a self-governing commune in the 11th century and ended when it was conquered by the French First Republic under Napoleon and replaced with the Ligurian Republic. The Ligurian Republic was annexed by the First French Empire in 1805; its restoration was briefly proclaimed in 1814 following the defeat of Napoleon, but it was annexed by the Kingdom of Sardinia in 1815.

== Name ==
From the 11th century to 1528 it was officially known as the Compagna Communis Ianuensis and from 1580 as the Serenìscima Repùbrica de Zêna ('the Most Serene Republic of Genoa') or also Repubblica di Genova (Latin: Res Publica Ianuensis, Ligurian: Repúbrica de Zêna). It was nicknamed by Petrarch as La Superba, in reference to its glory and impressive landmarks. For over eight centuries the republic was also known as la Dominante ('The Dominant one'), la Dominante dei mari ('the Dominant of the Seas'), and la Repubblica dei magnifici ('the Republic of the Magnificents').

== History ==
=== Background ===
After the fall of the Western Roman Empire, the city of Genoa was invaded by Germanic tribes. The Eastern Roman Empire during the reign of Emperor Justinian the Great captured the city in 537 under General Belisarius as part of the Renovatio imperii. About 643, Genoa and other Ligurian cities were captured by the Lombard Kingdom under the King Rothari. In 773 the Kingdom was annexed by the Frankish Empire; the first Carolingian count of Genoa was Ademarus, who was given the title praefectus civitatis Genuensis. During this time and in the following century Genoa was little more than a small centre, slowly building its merchant fleet, which was to become the leading commercial carrier of the Western Mediterranean. In 934–35 the town was thoroughly sacked and burned by a Fatimid fleet under Ya'qub ibn Ishaq al-Tamimi. This has led to discussion about whether early tenth-century Genoa was "hardly more than a fishing village" or a vibrant trading town worth attacking.

In 958, a diploma granted by Berengar II of Italy gave full legal freedom to the city of Genoa, guaranteeing the possession of its lands in the form of landed lordships. At the end of the 11th century the municipality adopted a constitution, at a meeting consisting of the city's trade associations (compagnie) and of the lords of the surrounding valleys and coasts. The new city-state was termed a Compagna Communis. The local organization remained politically and socially significant for centuries. As late as 1382, the members of the Grand Council were classified by both the compagnia to which they belonged as well as by their political faction ("noble" versus "popular").

=== Rise ===
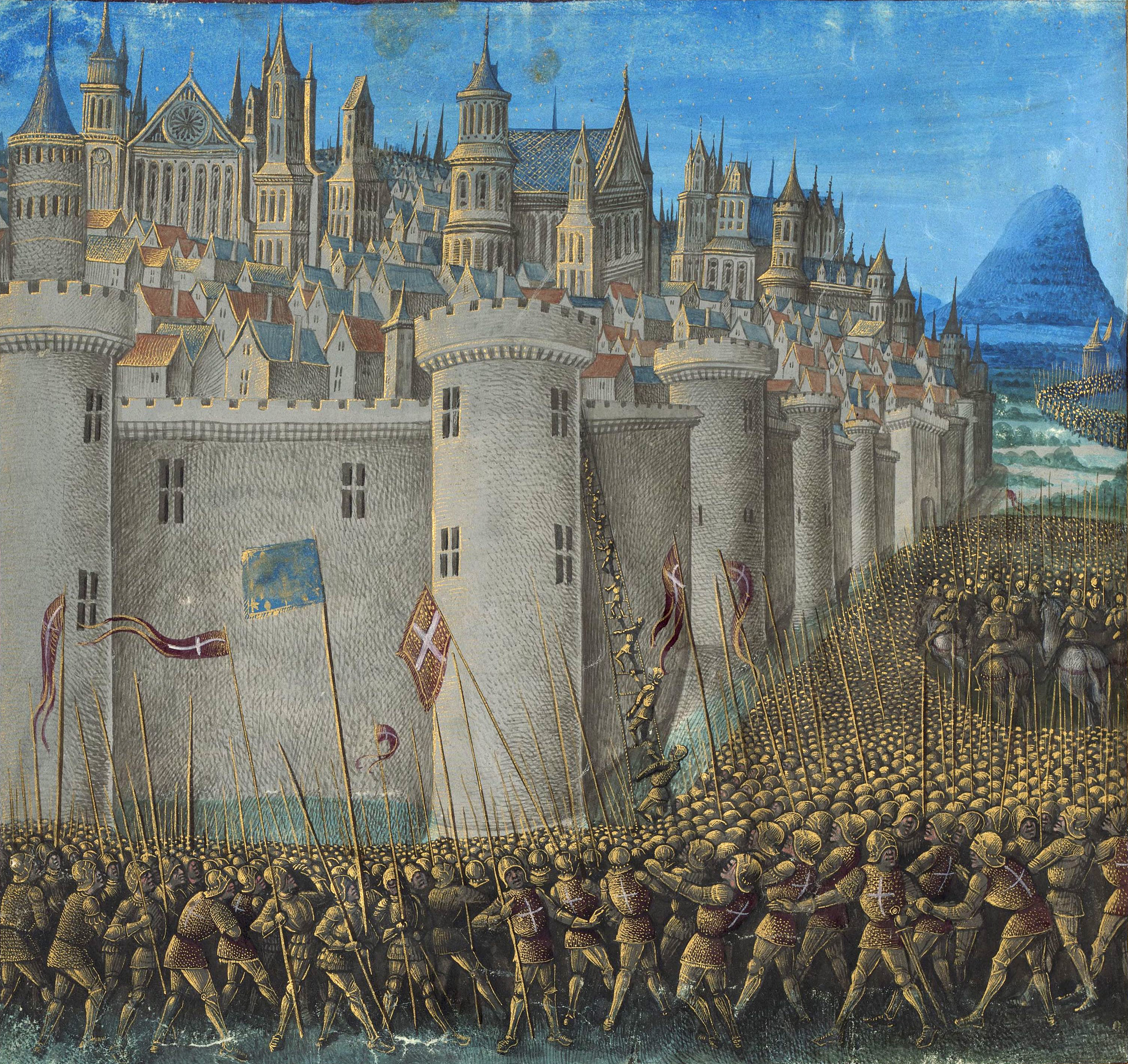
The Siege of Antioch, 1098.

Before 1100, Genoa emerged as an independent city-state, one of a number of Italian city-states during this period. Nominally, the Holy Roman Emperor was overlord and the Bishop of Genoa was president of the city; however, actual power was wielded by a number of "consuls" annually elected by popular assembly. At that time Muslim raiders were attacking coastal cities on the Tyrrhenian Sea. Muslims raided Pisa in 1000, and in 1015 they escalated their attacks, raiding Luni. Mujahid al-Siqlabi, Emir of the Taifa of Denia attacked Sardinia with a fleet of 125 ships. In 1016, the allied troops of Genoa and Pisa defended Sardinia. In 1066, war erupted between Genoa and Pisa – possibly over control of Sardinia.

The republic was one of the so-called "Maritime Republics" (Repubbliche Marinare), along with Venice, Pisa, Amalfi, Gaeta, Ancona, and Ragusa.

In the Mahdia campaign of 1087, supported by Pope Victor III, Italian forces led by Hugh of Pisa attacked the North African Zirid vassals of the Fatimid Caliphate. Genoese and Pisan fleets, accompanied by troops from Amalfi, Salerno, and Gaeta, captured the Zirid capital, but could not hold it. The Genoese and Pisan burned the fleet in the city's harbour and withdrew. The destruction of the Arab fleet gave control of the Western Mediterranean to Genoa, Venice, and Pisa. This enabled Western Europe to supply the troops of the First Crusade of 1096–1099 by sea.

In 1092, Genoa and Pisa, in collaboration with Alfonso VI of León and Castile attacked the Muslim Taifa of Valencia. They also unsuccessfully besieged Tortosa with support from troops of Sancho Ramírez, King of Aragon.

Genoa started expanding during the First Crusade. In 1097 Hugh of Châteauneuf, Bishop of Grenoble and William, Bishop of Orange, went to Genoa and preached in the church of San Siro in order to gather troops for the First Crusade. Twelve galleys, one ship, and 1,200 soldiers from Genoa joined the crusade. The Genoese troops, led by noblemen de Insula and Avvocato, set sail in July 1097. The Genoese fleet transported and provided naval support to the crusaders, mainly during the siege of Antioch in 1098, when the Genoese fleet blockaded the city while the troops provided support during the siege. In the siege of Jerusalem in 1099, Genoese crossbowmen led by Guglielmo Embriaco acted as support units against the defenders of the city.

After the capture of Antioch on 3 May 1098, Genoa forged an alliance with Bohemond of Taranto, who became the ruler of the Principality of Antioch. As a result, he granted them a headquarters, the church of San Giovanni, and 30 houses in Antioch. On 6 May 1098, a part of the Genoese army returned to Genoa with the relics of Saint John the Baptist, granted to the Republic of Genoa as part of their reward for providing military support to the First Crusade. Many settlements in the Middle East were given to Genoa as well as favourable commercial treaties.

Genoa later allied with King Baldwin I of Jerusalem (reigned 1100–1118). To secure the alliance, Baldwin gave Genoa one-third of the Lordship of Arsuf, one-third of Caesarea, and one-third of Acre and its port's income. Additionally the Republic of Genoa would receive 300 bezants every year, and one-third of Baldwin's conquest every time 50 or more Genoese soldiers joined his troops.

The Republic's role as a maritime power in the region secured many favourable commercial treaties for Genoese merchants. They came to control a large portion of the trade of the Byzantine Empire, Tripoli (Libya), the Principality of Antioch, Cilician Armenia, and Egypt. Although Genoa maintained free-trading rights in Egypt and Syria, it lost some of its territorial possessions after Saladin's campaigns in those areas in the late 12th century.

In 1147, Genoa took part in the Siege of Almería, helping Alfonso VII of León and Castile reconquer that city from the Muslims. After the conquest the republic leased out its third of the city to one of its own citizens, Otto de Bonvillano, who swore fealty to the republic and promised to guard the city with three hundred men at all times. This demonstrates how Genoa's early efforts at expanding her influence involved enfeoffing private citizens to the commune and controlling overseas territories indirectly, rather than through the republican administration. In 1148, it joined the Siege of Tortosa and helped Count Raymond Berengar IV of Barcelona take that city, for which it also received a third.

Over the course of the 11th and particularly the 12th centuries, Genoa became the dominant naval force in the Western Mediterranean, as its erstwhile rivals Pisa and Amalfi declined in importance. Genoa (along with Venice) succeeded in gaining a central position in the Mediterranean slave trade at this time. This left the Republic with only one major rival in the Mediterranean: Venice. The Genoese slave trade and the Venetian slave trade were the main players of the slave trade in the Mediterranean during the Middle Ages.

Genoese Crusaders brought home a green glass goblet from the Levant, which Genoese long regarded as the Holy Grail. Not all of Genoa's merchandise was so innocuous, however, as medieval Genoa became a major player in the slave trade.

=== 13th and 14th centuries ===
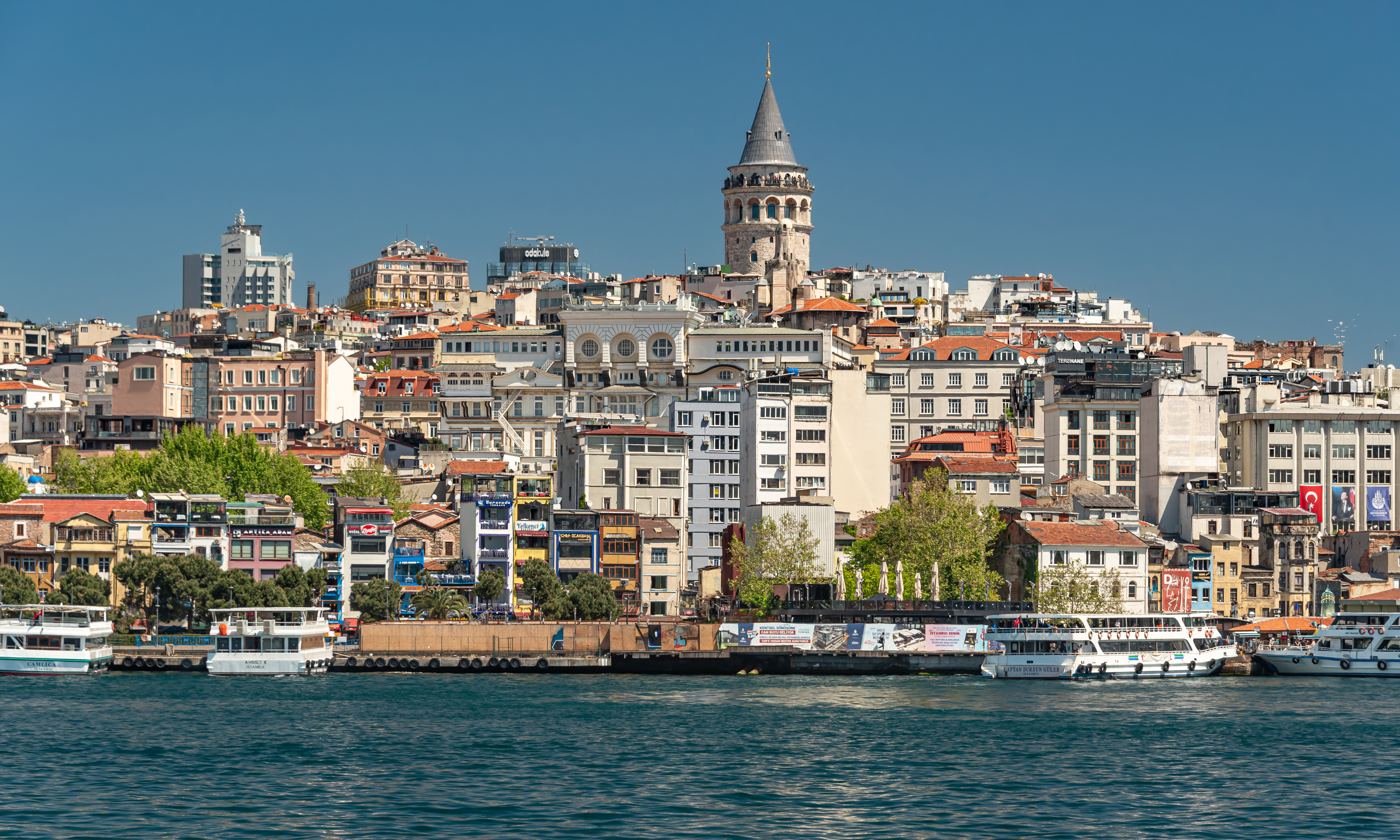
Galata Tower (1348) in Galata, Istanbul.

The commercial and cultural rivalry between Genoa and Venice played out throughout the thirteenth century. The Republic of Venice played a significant role in the Fourth Crusade, diverting "Latin" energies to the ruin of its former patron and present trading rival, Constantinople. As a result, Venetian support of the newly established Latin Empire meant that Venetian trading rights were enforced, and Venice gained control of a large portion of the commerce of the eastern Mediterranean.

In order to regain control of the commerce, the Republic of Genoa allied with Michael VIII Palaiologos, emperor of Nicaea, who wanted to restore the Byzantine Empire by recapturing Constantinople. In March 1261 the treaty of the alliance was signed in Nymphaeum. On 25 July 1261, Nicaean troops under Alexios Strategopoulos recaptured Constantinople.

As a result, the balance of favour tipped toward Genoa, which was granted free trade rights in the Nicene Empire. Besides the control of commerce in the hands of Genoese merchants, Genoa received ports and way stations in many islands and settlements in the Aegean Sea. The islands of Chios and Lesbos became commercial stations of Genoa as well as the city of Smyrna (İzmir).

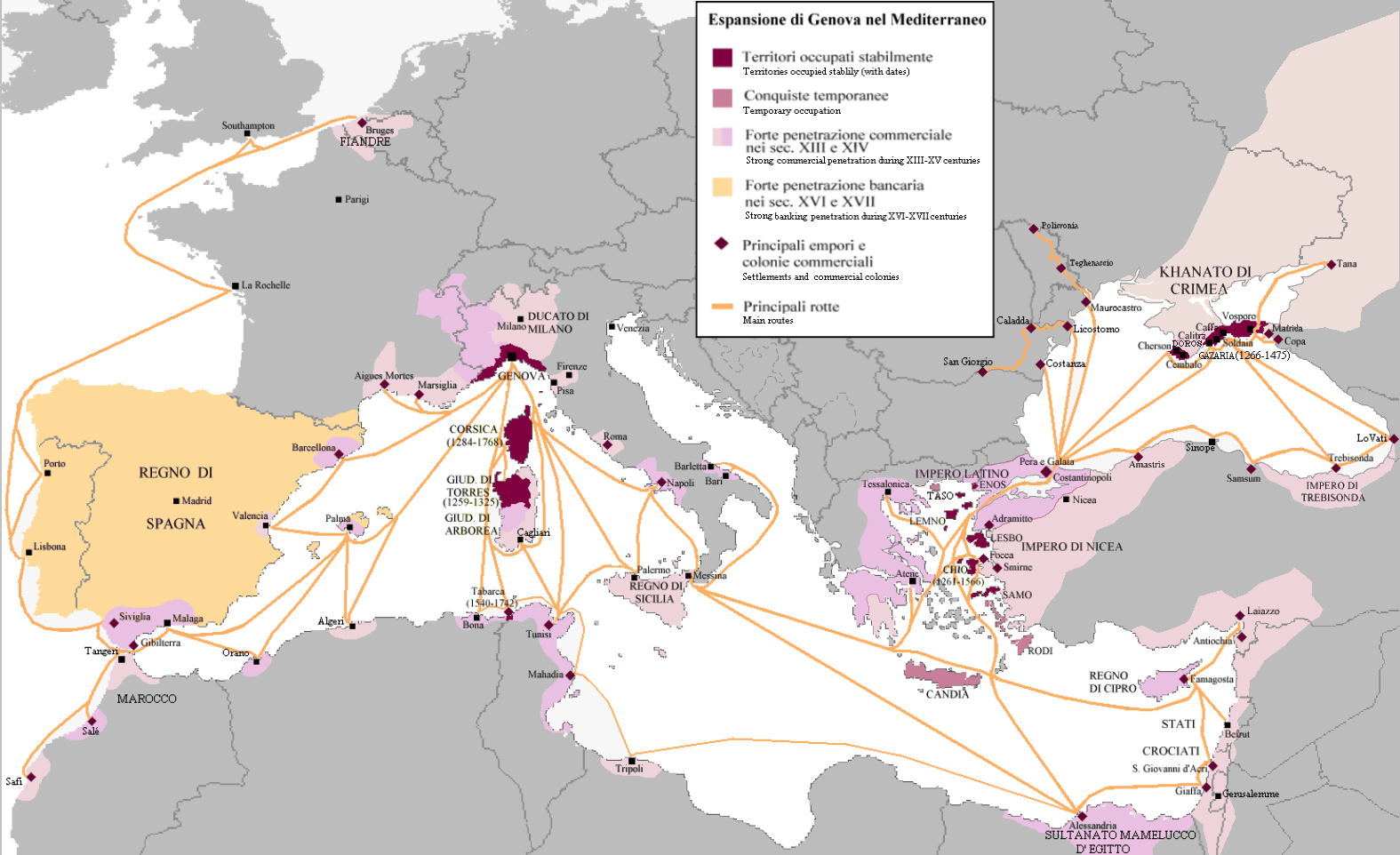
Territories of the Republic of Genoa (economic influence areas shown in pink) around the mediterranean & Black Sea coasts, 1400, since the Codex Latinus Parisinus (1395).

Genoa and Pisa became the only states with trading rights in the Black Sea. In the same century the Republic conquered many settlements in Crimea, where the Genoese colony of Caffa was established. The alliance with the restored Byzantine Empire increased the wealth and power of Genoa and simultaneously decreased Venetian and Pisan commerce. The Byzantine Empire had granted the majority of free trading rights to Genoa. In 1282 Pisa tried to gain control of the commerce and administration of Corsica, after being called for support by the judge Sinucello who revolted against Genoa. In August 1282, part of the Genoese fleet blockaded Pisan commerce near the river Arno. During 1283 both Genoa and Pisa made war preparations. Genoa built 120 galleys, 60 of which belonged to the Republic, while the other 60 galleys were rented to individuals. More than 15,000 mercenaries were hired as rowmen and soldiers. The Pisan fleet avoided combat, and tried to wear out the Genoese fleet during 1283. On 5 August 1284, in the naval Battle of Meloria the Genoese fleet, consisting of 93 ships led by Oberto Doria and Benedetto I Zaccaria, defeated the Pisan fleet, which consisted of 72 ships and was led by Albertino Morosini and Ugolino della Gherardesca. Genoa captured 30 Pisan ships and sank seven. About 8,000 Pisans were killed during the battle, more than half of the Pisan troops, which were about 14,000. The defeat of Pisa, which never fully recovered as a maritime competitor, resulted in gain of control of the commerce of Corsica by Genoa. The Sardinian town of Sassari, which was under Pisan control, became a commune or self-styled "free municipality" which was controlled by Genoa. Control of Sardinia, however, did not pass permanently to Genoa: the Aragonese kings of Naples disputed control and did not secure it until the fifteenth century.

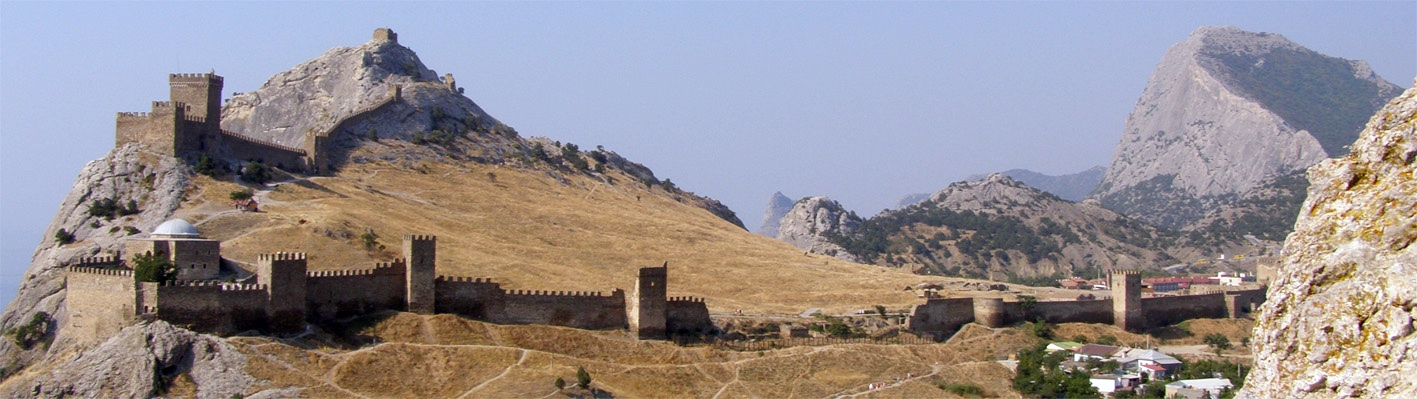
The Genoese fortress in Sudak, Crimea.

Genoese merchants pressed south, to the island of Sicily, and into Muslim North Africas, where Genoese established trading posts, pursuing the gold that travelled up through the Sahara and establishing Atlantic depots as far afield as Salé and Safi. In 1283 the population of the Kingdom of Sicily revolted against the Angevin rule. The revolt became known as the Sicilian Vespers. As a result, the Aragonese rule was established in the Kingdom. Genoa, which had supported the Aragonese, was granted free trading and export rights in the Kingdom of Sicily. Genoese bankers also profited from loans to the new nobility of Sicily. Corsica was formally annexed in 1347.

Genoa was far more than a depot of drugs and spices from the East: an essential engine of its economy was the weaving of silk textiles, from imported thread, following the symmetrical styles of Byzantine and Sassanian silks.

As a result of the economic retrenchment in Europe in the late fourteenth century, as well as its long war with Venice, which culminated in its defeat at Chioggia (1380), Genoa went into decline. This pivotal war with Venice has come to be called the War of Chioggia because of this decisive battle which resulted in the defeat of Genoa at the hands of Venice. Prior to the War of Chioggia, which lasted from 1379 until 1381, the Genoese had enjoyed a naval ascendency that was the source of their power and position within northern Italy. The Genoan defeat deprived Genoa of this naval supremacy, pushed it out of eastern Mediterranean markets and began the decline of the city-state. Rising Ottoman power also cut into the Genoese emporia in the Aegean, and the Black Sea trade was reduced.

In 1396, in order to protect the republic from internal unrest and the provocations of the Duke of Orléans and the former Duke of Milan, the Doge of Genoa Antoniotto Adorno made Charles VI of France the difensor del comune ('defender of the municipality') of Genoa. Though the republic had previously been under partial foreign control, this marked the first time Genoa was dominated by a foreign power.

=== Golden age of Genoese bankers ===
Though not well-studied, Genoa in the 15th century seems to have been tumultuous. The city had a strong tradition of trading goods from the Levant and its financial expertise was recognised all over Europe. After a brief period of French domination from 1394 to 1409, Genoa came under the rule of the Visconti of Milan. Genoa lost Sardinia to the Crown of Aragon, Corsica to internal revolt, and its colonies in the Middle East, Eastern Europe, and Asia Minor to the Ottoman Empire.

In the 15th century, two of the earliest banks in the world were founded in Genoa: the Bank of Saint George, founded in 1407, which was the oldest state deposit bank in the world at its closure in 1805, and the mount of piety of Genoa was founded in 1483 and it still exists.

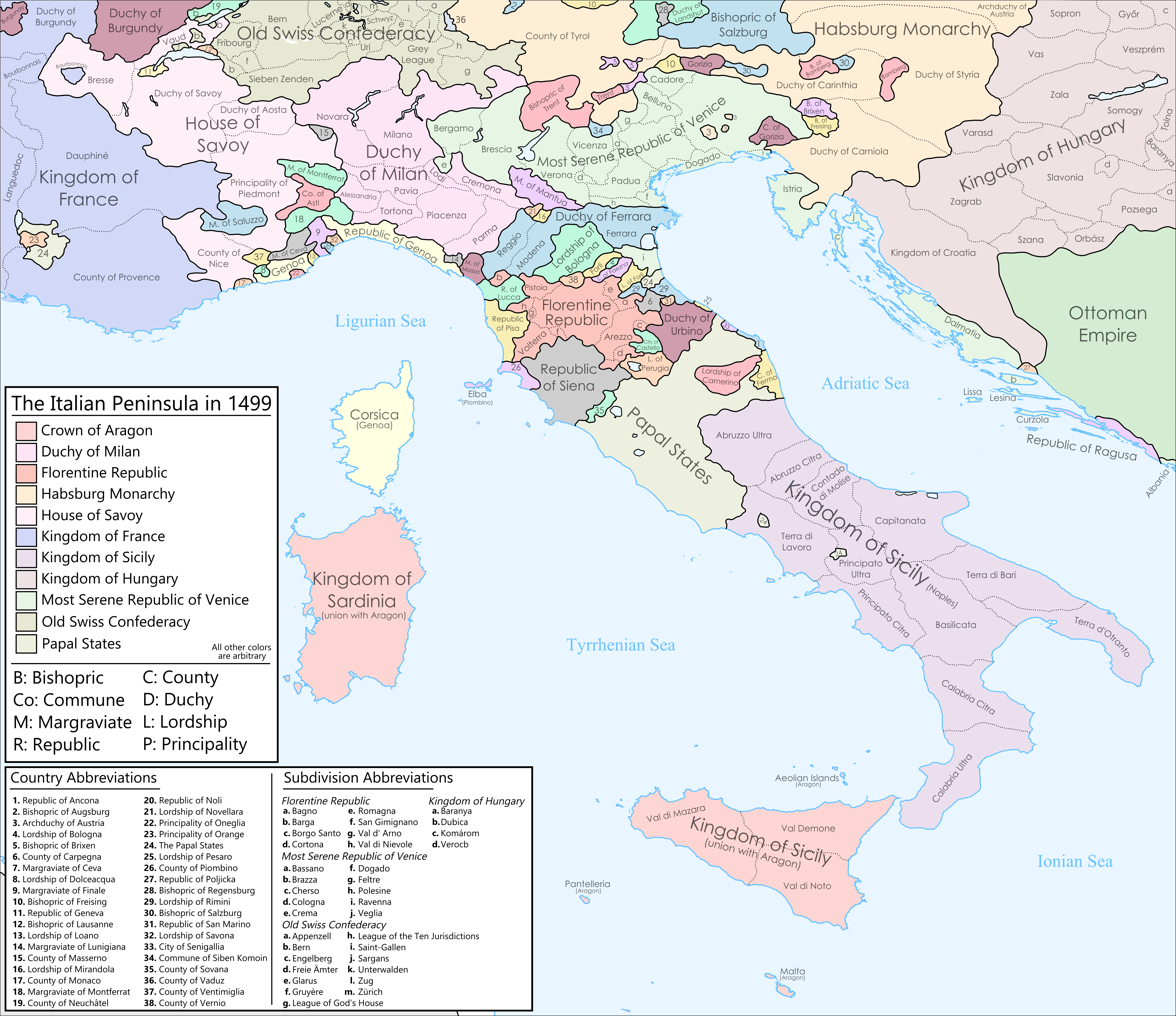
Map showing the political divisions of Italy in 1499

Threatened by Alfonso V of Aragon, the Doge of Genoa in 1458 handed the Republic over to the French, making it the Duchy of Genoa under the control of John of Anjou, a French royal governor. However, with support from Milan, Genoa revolted and the Republic was restored in 1461. The Milanese then changed sides, conquering Genoa in 1464 and holding it as a fief of the French crown. Between 1463–1478 and 1488–1499, Genoa was held by the Milanese House of Sforza. From 1499 to 1528, the Republic reached its nadir, being under nearly continual French occupation. The Spanish, with their intramural allies, the "old nobility" entrenched in the mountain fastnesses behind Genoa, captured the city on May 30, 1522, and subjected the city to a pillage. When the admiral Andrea Doria of the powerful Doria family allied with the Emperor Charles V to oust the French and restore Genoa's independence, a renewed prospect opened: 1528 marks the first loan from Genoese banks to Charles.

Under the ensuing economic recovery, many aristocratic Genoese families, such as the Balbi, Doria, Grimaldi, Pallavicini, and Serra, amassed tremendous fortunes. According to Felipe Fernández-Armesto and others, the practices Genoa developed in the Mediterranean (such as chattel slavery) were crucial in the exploration and exploitation of the New World.

At the time of Genoa's peak in the 16th century, the city attracted many artists, including Rubens, Caravaggio, and van Dyck. The architect Galeazzo Alessi (1512–1572) designed many of the city's splendid palazzi. In the next 50 years, other palazzi were designed by Bartolomeo Bianco (1590–1657), designer of centrepieces of the University of Genoa. A number of Genoese Baroque and Rococo artists settled elsewhere and a number of local artists became prominent.

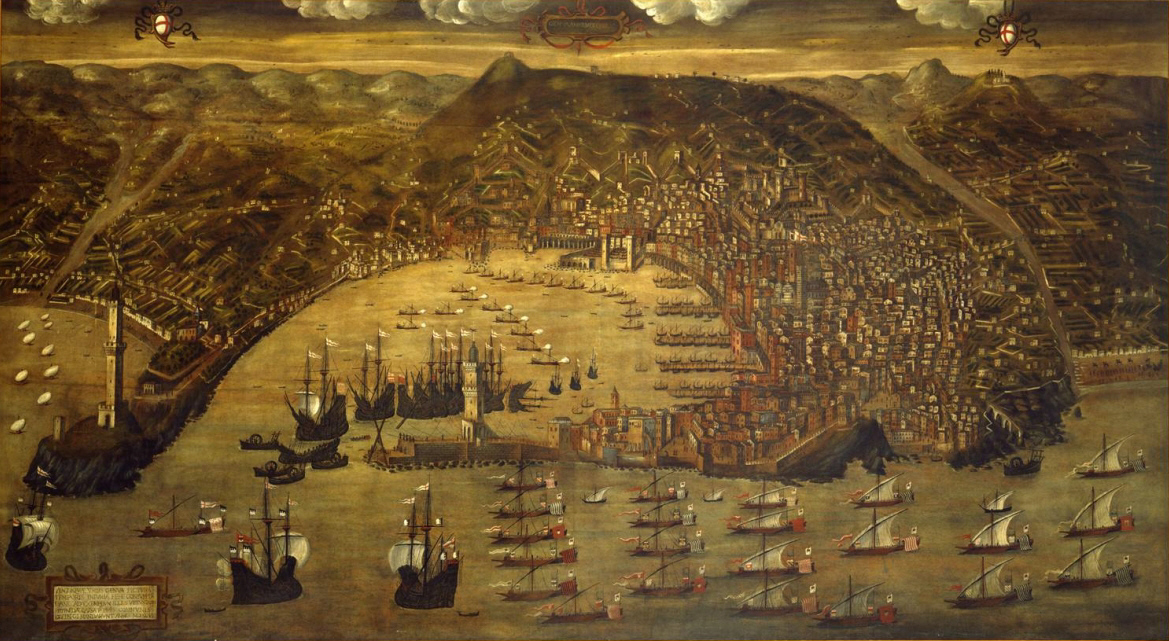
A view of Genoa and its fleet by Christoforo de Grassi (1597 copy, after a drawing of 1481); Galata Museo del Mare, Genoa

Thereafter, Genoa underwent something of a revival as a junior associate of the Spanish Empire, with Genoese bankers, in particular, financing many of the Spanish crown's foreign endeavors from their counting houses in Seville. Fernand Braudel has even called the period 1557 to 1627 the "age of the Genoese", "of a rule that was so discreet and sophisticated that historians for a long time failed to notice it". However, the modern visitor passing brilliant Mannerist and Baroque palazzo facades along Genoa's Strada Nova (now Via Garibaldi) or via Balbi cannot fail to notice that there was conspicuous wealth, which in fact was not Genoese but concentrated in the hands of a tightly knit circle of banker-financiers, true "venture capitalists". Genoa's trade, however, remained closely dependent on control of Mediterranean sealanes, and the loss of Chios to the Ottoman Empire (1566), struck a severe blow.

The opening for the Genoese banking consortium was the state bankruptcy of Philip II in 1557, which threw the German banking houses into chaos and ended the reign of the Fuggers as Spanish financiers. The Genoese bankers provided the unwieldy Habsburg system with fluid credit and a dependably regular income. In return the less dependable shipments of American silver were rapidly transferred from Seville to Genoa, to provide capital for further ventures.

From about 1520 the Genoese controlled the Spanish port of Panama, the first port on the Pacific, founded by the conquest of the Americas. The Genoese obtained a concession to exploit the port mainly for the slave trade of the new world on the Pacific, which lasted until the sacking and destruction of the original city in 1671.

In 1635, Don Sebastián Hurtado de Corcuera, who had been governor of Panama, recruited Genoese, Peruvian, and Panamanian soldiers to fight in the Philippines, where he had been appointed governor, against the Muslim Sultanates of Sulu and Maguindanao. In this situation Genoese bankers were thus active in Spain's Mediterranean and New World possessions (Peru, Mexico, and Philippines).

The Genoese banker Ambrogio Spinola, Marquess of Los Balbases, for instance, raised and led an army that fought in the Eighty Years' War in the Netherlands in the early 17th century. The decline of Spain in the 17th century brought also the renewed decline of Genoa, and the Spanish crown's frequent bankruptcies, in particular, ruined many of Genoa's merchant houses.

=== Decline ===
In May 1625, a French-Savoian army briefly laid siege to Genoa. Though that siege was eventually lifted with the aid of the Spanish, the French would later bombard the city in May 1684 for its support of Spain during the War of the Reunions. In-between, a plague killed as many as half of the inhabitants of Genoa in 1656–57. Genoa continued its slow decline well into the 18th century, losing its last Mediterranean colony, the island fortress of Tabarka, to the Bey of Tunis in 1742.

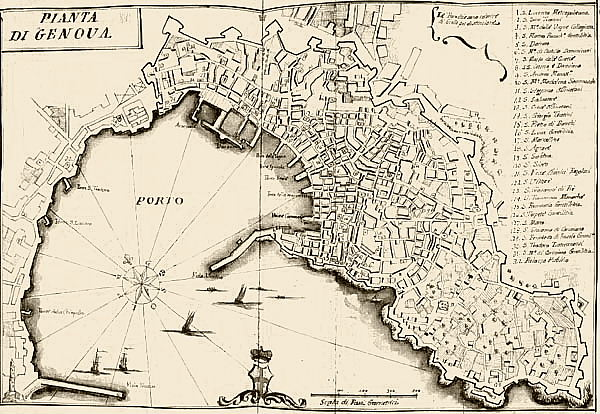
Ancient map of Genoa as it was inside the "old walls"; attributed to Francesco Maria Accinelli (1700–1777)

As its economy and power both continued to decline, in 1729 the Republic had to face another revolt in Corsica. It is seen as the first real rupture between the island and the Genoese Republic: it may also be the most important, because the representatives of the Church and the Roman Curia both "justified" the war. This time the Genoese government requested the help of Charles VI. After Genoa paid a 60,000 florins lump sum and 100 scudi for each dead soldier, Charles sent 10,000 German infantry of the Imperial Army to join the Republic's soldiers commanded by Camillo Doria. Genoa managed to contain the rebellion, but this was not to last. A revolt in 1733 had the Genoese appealing to the Emperor for help, but the Imperial Army was tied up against the French in the ongoing War of the Polish Succession, and thus declined to intervene. Even before the rebellions, Genoa had only had loose control of the island; the Republic had effectively demilitarized itself, with only 2,000 soldiers (all spread throughout fortifications in Liguria) for a mainland population of about half a million, and law and order on Corsica were very weak, with nearly 900 murders per 100,000 people there annually from 1701 to 1733. The Genoese government tried to ban private firearm ownership on Corsica without success. A guerrilla war would continue on the island until it was sold to France in 1768.

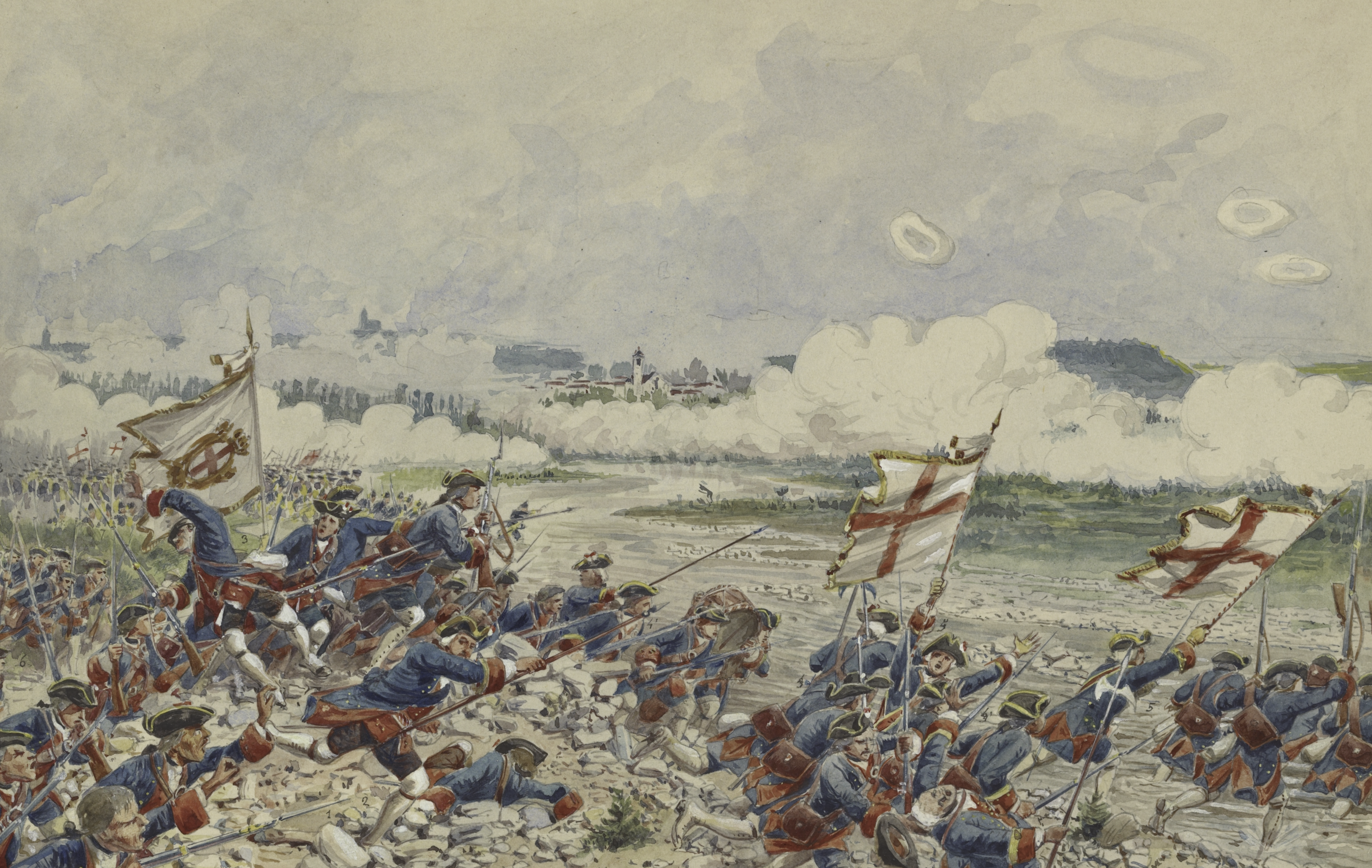
Genoese soldiers during the War of the Austrian Succession

The Convention of Turin of 1742, in which Austria allied with the Kingdom of Sardinia, caused some consternation in the Republic. However, when this temporary alliance was made more reliable and lasting via the 1743 Treaty of Worms, the fear of diplomatic isolation had caused the Genoese Republic to abandon its neutrality and to ally with the House of Bourbon in the War of the Austrian Succession. Consequently, the Republic of Genoa signed a secret treaty with France, the Spain and the Kingdom of Naples, all three of which were ruled by Bourbons. On 26 June 1745, the Republic of Genoa declared war on the Kingdom of Sardinia. This decision would prove disastrous for Genoa, which later surrendered to the Austrians in September 1746 and was briefly occupied until a revolt liberated the city two months later. The Austrians returned in 1747 and, along with a contingent of Sardinian forces, laid siege to Genoa before being driven off by the approach of a Franco-Spanish army.

Though Genoa retained its lands in the Peace of Aix-la-Chapelle, it was unable to keep its hold on Corsica in its weakened state. After driving out the Genoese, the Corsican Republic was declared in 1755. Eventually relying on French intervention to quash the rebellion, Genoa was forced to cede Corsica to the French in the 1768 Treaty of Versailles.

=== The end of the Republic and its brief revival in 1814 ===
In 1794 and 1795 the ideals of France's revolution reached Genoa, thanks to Genoese propagandists then taking refuge in southeastern France, and a conspiracy against the aristocratic and oligarchic ruling class developed. In 1796, the French army under Napoleon defeated Austria and Piedmont, gaining control of the region. In May 1797, Genoese Jacobins, aided by French volunteers, moved to overthrow Doge Giacomo Maria Brignole, giving rise to a civil war in the streets between opponents and supporters of the government.

Napoleon's representatives then intervened. In early June, the old elites who had ruled Genoa for all of its history were overthrown. On June 14, 1797, the Ligurian Republic was proclaimed, under the watchful care of Republican France. After Bonaparte's seizure of power in France, a more conservative constitution was enacted, but the Ligurian Republic's life was short: in 1805 it was annexed by France, becoming the départements of Apennins, Gênes, and Montenotte.

With the fall of Napoleon, Genoa temporarily regained independence as the Repubblica genovese, which lasted less than a year. However, the subsequent Congress of Vienna assigned all Genoese territories (all of Liguria, the Oltregiogo area, and the island of Capraia) to the Kingdom of Sardinia, ruled by the House of Savoy, even though this contravened the principle of restoring legitimate governments and monarchies.

In 1849, the Genoese retained strong traditions of republicanism and autonomy, which made them resistant to Sardinian rule, leading to a week-long conflict violently suppressed led to sack of the city by the Royal Sardinian army.

== Government ==
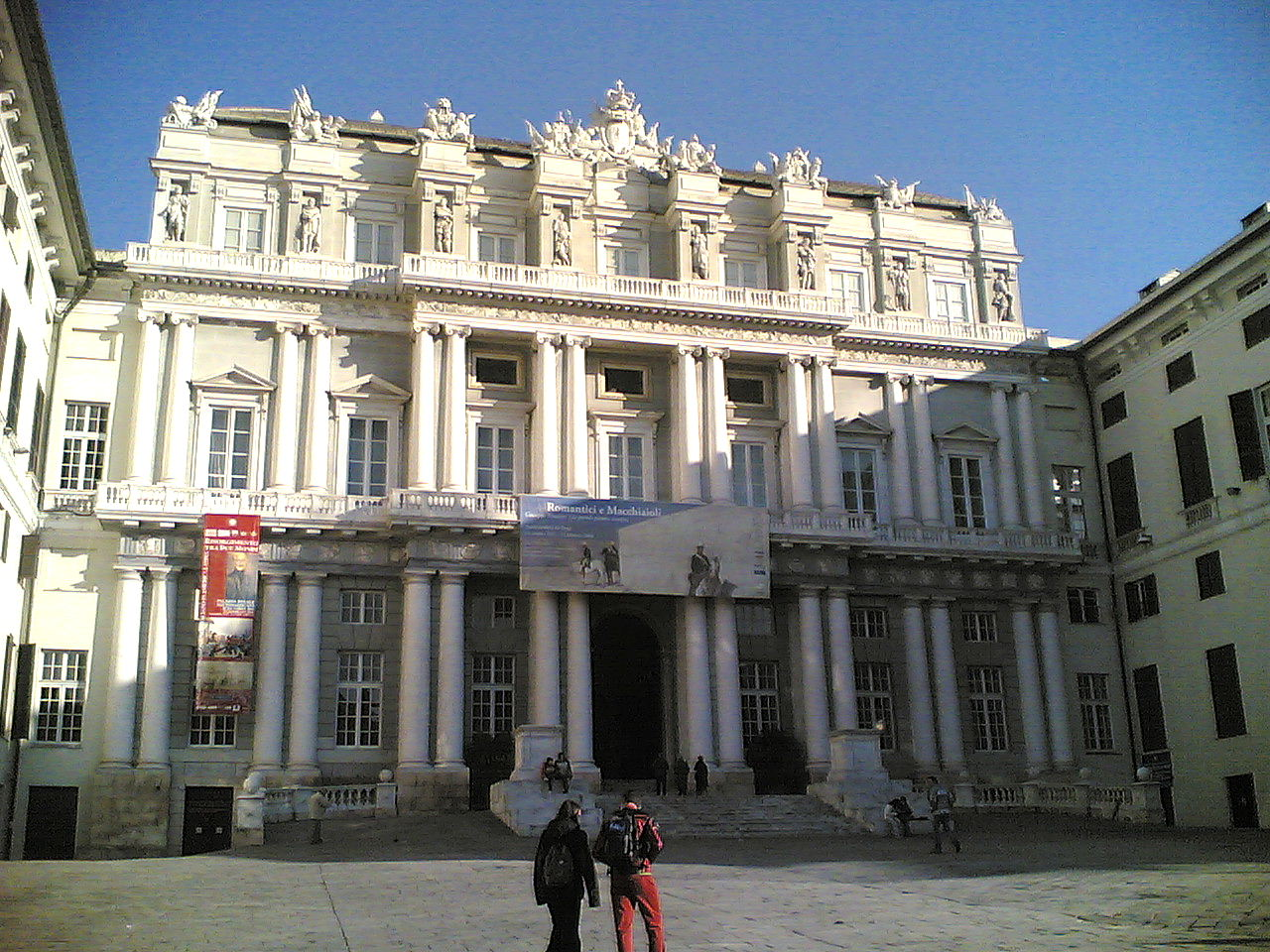
The Palace of the Doges view from Piazza Matteotti.

The history of Genoa, of the Genoese and of the republic that held its fate for a long time, but also of the governments that gradually took turns leading the city, to reach the time of the Doges, is traceable through the work of historians who have continued the storytelling work begun at the end of the 11th century by Caffaro Di Caschifellone (historian and himself municipal consul) with the "Annales ianuenses".

The Republic of Genoa's governance history is divided into five stages:

- Consul: 11th century – 1191
- Podestà: 1191–1256
- Capitano del popolo: 1257–1339
- Doge (elected for life): 1339–1528
- Doge (elected for terms of two years): 1528–1797

The republic was substantially democratic in shape, while those of the Podestàs and the Captains of the people strongly restored the often conflicting relationship between the authority and the freedom. The perpetual doges, on the other hand, proclaimed themselves popular, even though sometimes crossing the oligarchy; finally the fifth republic was institutionally aristocratic. By custom, prelates in Genoa were unable to take on public office.

== Aristocratic families ==
Coat of arms of the Fregoso family, one of the most influential dynasties in the history of the republic.

In the first two centuries from the institution of the Dogate for life in Genoa, it was above all the Adorno (seven doges elected) and Fregoso (ten doges elected) families who fought the position.

After the reform of 1528, among the seventy-nine "biennial Doges" who came to power, many were elected from a small number of noble houses in the city organized into 28 "Alberghi", in particular:

- Grimaldi: eleven doges.
- Spinola: eleven doges.
- Durazzo: eight doges.
- De Franchi, Giustiniani and Lomellini families: seven doges each.
- Centurione: six doges.
- Doria: six doges.
- Cattaneo: five doges.
- Gentile: five doges.
- Brignole: four doges.
- Imperiali: four doges.
- De Mari, Invrea and Negrone families: four doges each.
- Pallavicini: three doges.
- Sauli: three doges.
- Lercari: three doges.
- Balbi, Cambiaso, Chiavari, Pinelli, Promontorio, Veneroso, Viale and Zoagli families: two doges each.
- Della Torre: two doges.
- Assereto, Ayroli, Canevaro, Chiavica Cibo, Clavarezza, Da Passano, De Ferrari, De Fornari, De Marini, Di Negro, Ferreti, Franzoni, Frugoni, Garbarino, Giudice Calvi, Odone, Saluzzo, Senarega, Vacca and Vivaldi: one doge each
- Della Rovere: one doge.

Other influential families of the Republic of Genoa were:

- Fieschi: counts of Lavagna, and produced two Popes: Pope Innocent IV and Pope Adrian V
- Gattilusi: lords of numerous lands in the Aegean Sea, such as Lemnos, Lesbos, Enez and Samothrace.
- Embriaco: Lords of Gibeletto for almost 200 years, and important players in the history of the Crusader states.
- Zaccaria: rulers of several polities in Latin-ruled Greece, including the Lordship of Chios and lastly, the Principality of Achaea, and produced one admiral, Benedetto I Zaccaria.

== Genoese possessions ==
At the time of its founding in the early 11th century the Republic of Genoa consisted of the city of Genoa and the surrounding areas. As the commerce of the city increased, so did the territory of the Republic. By the end of the 12th century all of Liguria fell under the Republic of Genoa. After the First Crusade in 1098 Genoa gained settlements in Syria. (It lost the majority of them during the campaigns of Saladin in the 12th century.) In 1261 the city of Smyrna in Asia Minor became Genoese territory.

In 1255, Genoa established the colony of Caffa in Crimea. In the following years the Genoese established further colonies in Crimea: Soldaia, Cherco and Cembalo. Genoa and its colonies fought against several Mongol states in the Genoese–Mongol Wars to control the Crimean peninsula. In 1275 the Byzantine Empire granted the islands of Chios and Samos to Genoa.

Between 1316 and 1332, Genoa established the Black Sea colonies of La Tana (present-day Azov) and Samsun in Anatolia. In 1355, the Byzantine Emperor John V Palaiologos granted Lesbos to a Genoese lord. At the end of the 14th century the colony of Samastri was established in the Black Sea and Cyprus was granted to the Republic. At that period the Republic of Genoa also controlled one quarter of Constantinople, capital of the Byzantine Empire, and Trebizond, capital of the Empire of Trebizond. The Ottoman Empire conquered most of the Genoese overseas territories during the 15th century.

=== Other territories outside mainland Italy ===
Genoa possessions in Crimea

- Giudicato of Logudoro (island of Sardinia) 1259–1325
- North Aegean Sea possessions, centered at Chios 1261–1566
- Southern Crimea possessions of Gazaria 1266–1475 (lost to Ottoman Empire, Kefe Eyalet)
- Island of Corsica 1284–1768
- The cities of Gibelet (1100–late 13th century) and Tyre (present-day Lebanon)
- City of Tabarka north west of Tunisia 1540–1742
- The cities of Calafat, Giurgiu, Licostomo, Vicina and Galați, all cities in present-day Romania (from the 13th century to the 15th century)
- Part of the County of Nice ceded to France after the Treaty of Turin in 1860.
- Monaco was sold to the Grimaldi family in the 15th century

== Economy ==
Genoese traders bought salt – from Hyères near Toulon in French Provence, from Cagliari in Sardinia, Tortosa in Iberia, and from other areas in the Black Sea, North Africa, Cyprus, Crete, and Ibiza – and made salami. They then sold salami in southern Italy for raw silk, which was sold in Lucca for fabrics, which were then sold to Lyon. Mule caravans from Genoa carried salt directly to Piacenza, where it was transferred to river barges and transported down the Po to Parma, and other Po Valley cities such as Reggio and Bologna. Along these trade routes, Genoa competed with Venice for salt and for other cargoes, such as salami, prosciutto, cheese, textiles and spices.

== Notable people ==
- Christopher Columbus, late 15th century Genoese explorer sponsored by the Catholic Monarchs of Spain who was the first person to find a route to the Caribbean and South America
- Giovanni Giustiniani, nobleman, mercenary captain, and defender of Constantinople during its siege in 1453.
- Ingo della Volta, late 11th century or early 12th century Genoese politician

== See also ==
- Doge of Genoa
- Genoese colonies
- Genoese crossbowmen
- Gazaria (Genoese colonies)
- Great Council and Minor Council of Genoa
