= Giacomo Maria Brignole =

Doge of Genoa (1724–1801)

- Giacomo Maria Brignole Sale

176th and 184th Doge of the Republic of Genoa
- In office 4 March 1779 – 4 March 1781
- Preceded by: Giuseppe Lomellini
- Succeeded by: Marco Antonio Gentile
- In office 17 November 1795 – 6 June 1797
- Preceded by: Giuseppe Maria Doria
- Succeeded by: Position abolished

Personal details
- Born: 10 December 1724 Genoa, Republic of Genoa
- Died: 21 December 1801 (aged 77) Florence, Kingdom of Etruria

Giacomo Maria Brignole Sale (1724–1801) was the 176th and 184th Doge of the Republic of Genoa, respectively from 1779 to 1781 and from 1795 to 1797. He was the last doge in the history of the Republic, and the only one elected twice, a unique case in the history of that Republic for the biennial election doges. After Brignole's dogeship the Genoese state and the office were abolished.

== Life as the Doge of the Republic ==
=== First term ===
The coronation ceremony was held on 13 September 1779 inside the Church of Santi Ambrogio and Andrea, since the Palazzo Ducale's hall of the Grand Council was not accessible due to the fire of 1777, and subsequent reconstruction work. The first term of Doge Brignole was marked by a virulent smallpox epidemic which quickly spread throughout the Republic and by the numerous incursions of the Barbary pirates along the coasts of Liguria. A fortunate expedition against the raiders, mounted by Gerolamo Durazzo, Brignole's brother-in-law, allowed Captain Giovanni De Marchi to kidnap several Xebecs off Bordighera. taking more than fifty.

Brignole left office on 4 March 1781, entering the junta of the Borders and then that of the Jurisdiction; from 1788 to 1796 he was the principal state inquisitor and in this capacity he managed to approve, at the end of 1790, a new stricter regulation of censorship.

=== Second term ===
In a climate now surreal and close to decline, Giacomo Maria Brignole was elected on 17 November 1795 once again as Genoese doge, a unique fact in the secular history of the Republic of Genoa. For the difficult moment, he refused any kind of celebration and the consequent coronation ceremony.

With Napoleon increasingly at the western gates of the Republic of Genoa, the policy of Doge Brignole was based entirely on the neutrality of the Genoese state—not joining the Austro-Sardinia coalition against France. The situation began to precipitate for the customs government with the increasingly victorious Napoleonic battles that inevitably sparked the first "followers" among the noble representatives and the Genoese people. The same representative of France residing in Genoa, Guillaume-Charles Faipoult, had direct orders from Napoleon to follow events in the capital of the republic. In May 1797, arrests of some Jacobin rioters followed, which caused unrest in the city and divided the minds of the Genoese in favor or against the ever-growing Napoleonic power.

The doge's son Gian Carlo Brignole also participated in the clashes with the Genoese Jacobins.

Now pressured by troops from across the Alps, he agreed with the senators to send an embassy to Bonaparte, who negotiated the establishment of a provisional government headed by the same doge Giacomo Maria Brignole on 14 June 1797, with the aim to draft a democratic constitution.

== Under Napoleon's rule ==
In a Republic of Genoa almost canceled by the Napoleonic events, the figure of the ex doge Brignole was chosen as the representative of a provisional government of the newly constituted Ligurian Republic, whose power was concentrated in the role of the doge and twelve senators, as well as various representatives pro-French and pro-Bonapartist nobility. However, the title of doge was abolished on 17 June that year - after the observations made by the lawyer Gaetano Marré of Borzonasca to the Municipality and to the doge himself. it was replaced with the title "President of the provisional government of the Ligurian Republic", descriptive of Brignole's effective role. He maintained in this precarious role, absenting himself whenever possible, until 17 January 1798, when a Directory took over.

=== Later years ===
In August 1798 some important people of the former Republic of Genoa, defined "dangerous individuals", were expelled from the state, among them Brignole, Stefano Rivarola, the brothers Girolamo, Giovanni Battista Serra and the Jacobin marquis Gaspare Sauli. Of the group, the two Serra brothers went to Milan, Giacomo Maria Brignole and Gaspare Sauli to Florence and Stefano Rivarola to his Chiavariese lands.

Brignole took up residence at the convent of San Paolino in Florence where he died on 21 December 1801.

== Personal life ==
Brignole married Barbara Durazzo, with whom he had six children. The eldest son Gian Carlo was finance minister of the Kingdom of Sardinia from 1816 to 1824.

The Palazzo Gio Carlo Brignole in Genoa was his property until 1798.

== See also ==
- Doge of Genoa
- Republic of Genoa

Preceded by Giuseppe Maria Doria	Doge of Genoa; 1795-1797	Succeeded by Title suppressed
