= Assereto =

Assereto is an Italian surname. Notable people with the surname include:

- Biagio Assereto (c. 1383–1456), Italian admiral
- Gerolamo Assereto (1543–1627), 87th Doge of the Republic of Genoa
- Gioacchino Assereto (1600–1649), Italian painter
