= Chiara Frugoni =

Italian historian (1940–2022)

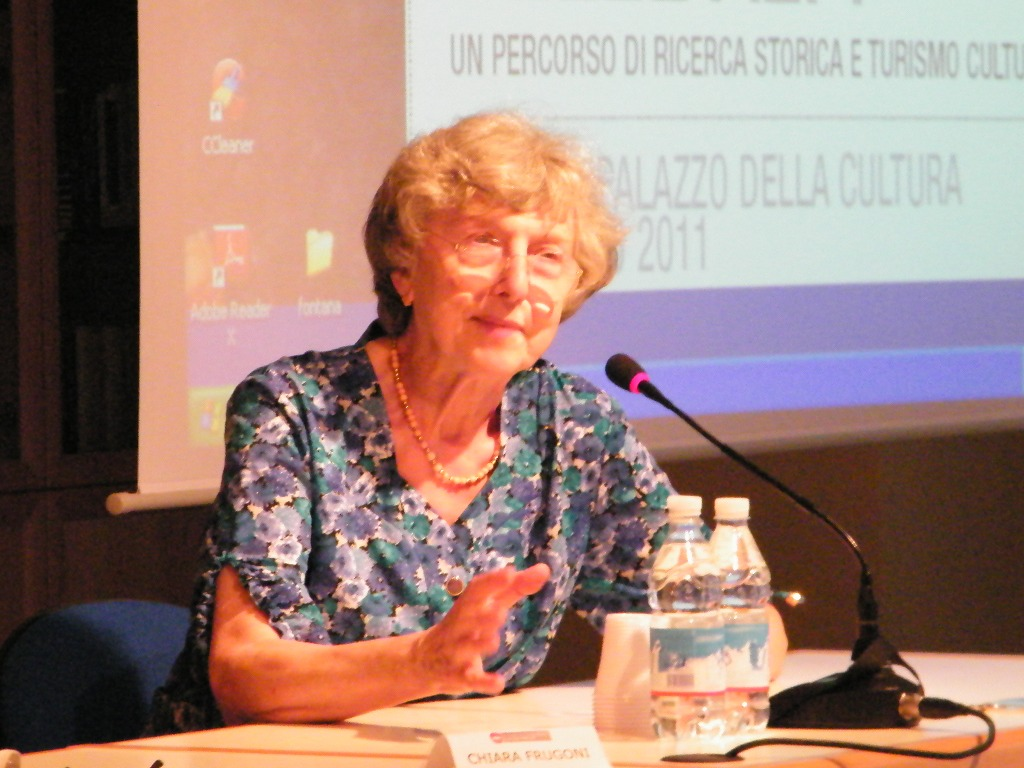
- Frugoni in 2011
- Born: 4 February 1940; Pisa, Italy
- Died: 9 April 2022 (aged 82); Pisa, Italy
- Education: Sapienza University of Rome
- Occupation: Historian
- Employer(s): University of Pisa; University of Rome Tor Vergata
- Awards: Viareggio Prize (1994)

Chiara Frugoni (4 February 1940 – 9 April 2022) was an Italian historian and academic, specialising in the Middle Ages and church history. She was awarded the Viareggio Prize in 1994 for her essay, Francesco e l'invenzione delle stimmate.

== Biography ==
Chiara Frugoni was born in Pisa on 4 February 1940. Her father was the medievalist, Arsenio Frugoni. She spent time during childhood and youth in a sanatorium due to suffering from tuberculosis.

Frugoni graduated from Università degli studi di Roma "La Sapienza" in 1964 with a thesis entitled Il tema dei tre vivi e dei tre morti nella tradizione medievale italiana (the Three Living and the Three Dead in Italian medieval tradition), published two years later in the "Atti della Accademia Nazionale dei Lincei". In it, she searched for a working method that took equal account of both texts and images, a method she always considered important, in line with her conviction that "the image speaks".

She married Salvatore Settis in 1965, with whom she had three children.

== Awards ==
- 1994: Viareggio Prize

== Selected works ==
- Una lontana città. Sentimenti e immagini nel Medioevo' (Collana Saggi n. 651). Torino: Einaudi. 1983.
- Francesco. Un'altra storia, con le immagini della Cappella Bardi. Milano: Marietti. 1988–2019.
- Francesco e l'invenzione delle stimmate. Una storia per parole e immagini fino a Bonaventura e Giotto' in Collana Saggi n. 780. Torino: Einaudi. 1993. (premio Viareggio 1994 for essays)
- Vita di un uomo: Francesco d'Assisi, Einaudi, Torino, 1995, con introduzione di Jacques Le Goff.
- Due Papi per un giubileo. Celestino V, Bonifacio VIII e il primo Anno Santo, Rizzoli, Milano, 2000.
- Medioevo sul naso. Occhiali, bottoni e altre invenzioni medievali, Laterza, Roma-Bari, 2001.
- Da stelle a stelle. Memorie di un paese contadino, Laterza, Roma-Bari, 2003 [dedicated to Solto Collina, a town in the Bergamo area].
- Civiltà dei Castelli, Ecra, Roma 2011.
- La cappella Scrovegni di Giotto a Padova con annesso DVD della Cappella, Einaudi, Torino, 2005.
- Una solitudine abitata: Chiara d'Assisi, Laterza, Roma-Bari, 2006.
- Il Battistero di Parma, guida ad una lettura iconografica in La cattedrale e il battistero di Parma con DVD, Einaudi, Torino, 2007.
- L'affare migliore di Enrico. Giotto e la cappella Scrovegni, Einaudi, Torino, 2008.
- La voce delle immagini. Pillole iconografiche dal Medioevo, Einaudi, Torino, 2010.
- Le storie di San Francesco. Guida agli affreschi della Basilica superiore di Assisi, ET Saggi collana, Einaudi, 2010. ISBN 978-88-06-20320-7.
- "Storia di Chiara e Francesco". Collana Frontiere. Torino: Einaudi. 2011. ISBN 978-88-06-20513-3.
- 'Quale Francesco? Il messaggio nascosto negli affreschi della Basilica superiore di Assisi', in Collana Grandi Opere. Torino: Einaudi. 2015. ISBN 978-88-06-22098-3.
- 'Vivere nel Medioevo. Donne, uomini e soprattutto bambini', in Collana Beaux livres. Bologna: Il Mulino. 2017. ISBN 978-88-15-27371-0.
- Le conseguenze di una citazione fuori posto, Edizioni Biblioteca Francescana, Milano, 2018. ISBN 978-88-7962-286-8.
- 'Uomini e animali nel Medioevo. Storie fantastiche e feroci', in Collana Grandi illustrati. Bologna: Il Mulino. 2018. ISBN 978-88-152-7968-2.
- Paradiso vista Inferno. Buon Governo e Tirannide nel Medioevo di Ambrogio Lorenzetti. Bologna: Il Mulino. 2019. ISBN 978-88-15-28522-5.

=== Collaborations ===
- Dizionario del Medioevo, with Alessandro Barbero, Laterza, Roma-Bari, 1994
- Bruno Zanardi, Il cantiere di Giotto. Le storie di san Francesco ad Assisi, introduction by Federico Zeri, historic-iconographic notes by Chiara Frugoni, Skira, Milano, 1996.
- Storia di un giorno in una città medioevale, with a commentary by Arsenio Frugoni, Laterza, Roma-Bari, 1997.
- Medioevo. Storia di voci, racconto di immagini, with Alessandro Barbero, Laterza, Roma-Bari, 1999.
- Mille e non più mille. Viaggio fra le paure di fine millennio, with Georges Duby, Rizzoli, Milano, 1999.
- Senza misericordia. Il Trionfo della Morte e la Danzamacabra a Clusone, with Simone Facchinetti, Einaudi, Torino 2016. ISBN 978-88-06-22479-0.

=== Editor and contributor ===
- 'Lo sguardo dell'uomo. Il Medioevo', in G. Duby and M. Perrot, Storia delle donne (Laterza: Roma-Bari, 1992), pp. 70–100.
- 'La donna nelle immagini, la donna immaginata' in La storia delle donne. Il Medioevo, edited by C. Klapisch-Zuber (Laterza: Roma-Bari, 1990), pp. 424–457.
- 'Benedetto Antelami e il Battistero di Parma', in Collana Saggi n. 801. Torino: Einaudi. 1995. ISBN 978-88-06-12659-9.
- La cattedrale di Modena. Modena: Panini. 1999. pp. 9–38.
- Pietro e Ambrogio Lorenzetti. Firenze: Le Lettere. 2002. pp. 121–199.
- 'Lavorare all'Inferno. Gli affreschi di Sant'Agata de' Goti' in Collana Grandi Opere. Roma-Bari: Laterza. 2004. ISBN 978-88-420-7484-7.
- 'Il Villani Illustrato. Firenze e L'Italia medievale nelle 253 immagini del ms. Chigiano L VIII 296 della Biblioteca Vaticana', in Biblioteca Vaticana. Firenze: Le Lettere. 2005. p. 7-12 [included the editing of most of the commentaries on the miniatures].

=== Fiction ===
- Perfino le stelle devono separarsi, Milano, Feltrinelli, 2013. ISBN 978-88-07-49152-8.
- San Francesco e il lupo, illustrations by Felice Feltracco, Milano, Feltrinelli, 2013.
- San Francesco e la notte di Natale, illustrations by Felice Feltracco, Milano, Feltrinelli, 2014.
- La storia della libellula coraggiosa, illustrations by Felice Feltracco, Milano, Feltrinelli, 2015.
- Quando il sole si arrabbia, illustrations by Felice Feltracco, Lucca, Cinquesensi Editore, 2017.
