= Veneroso =

Veneroso is a surname and may refer to:

- Ángel Moreno (baseball) (Ángel Veneroso Moreno; born 1955), Mexican baseball player
- Dr. Frank Veneroso, 1938 president of the Hazleton Redskins
- George Veneroso (1909–1996), American football player and coach
- Gerolamo Veneroso (1660–1739), 148th Doge of Genoa and king of Corsica
- Gian Giacomo Veneroso (1701–1758), 163rd Doge of Genoa
