= Linda Lercari =

Italian multimedia artist (born 1972)

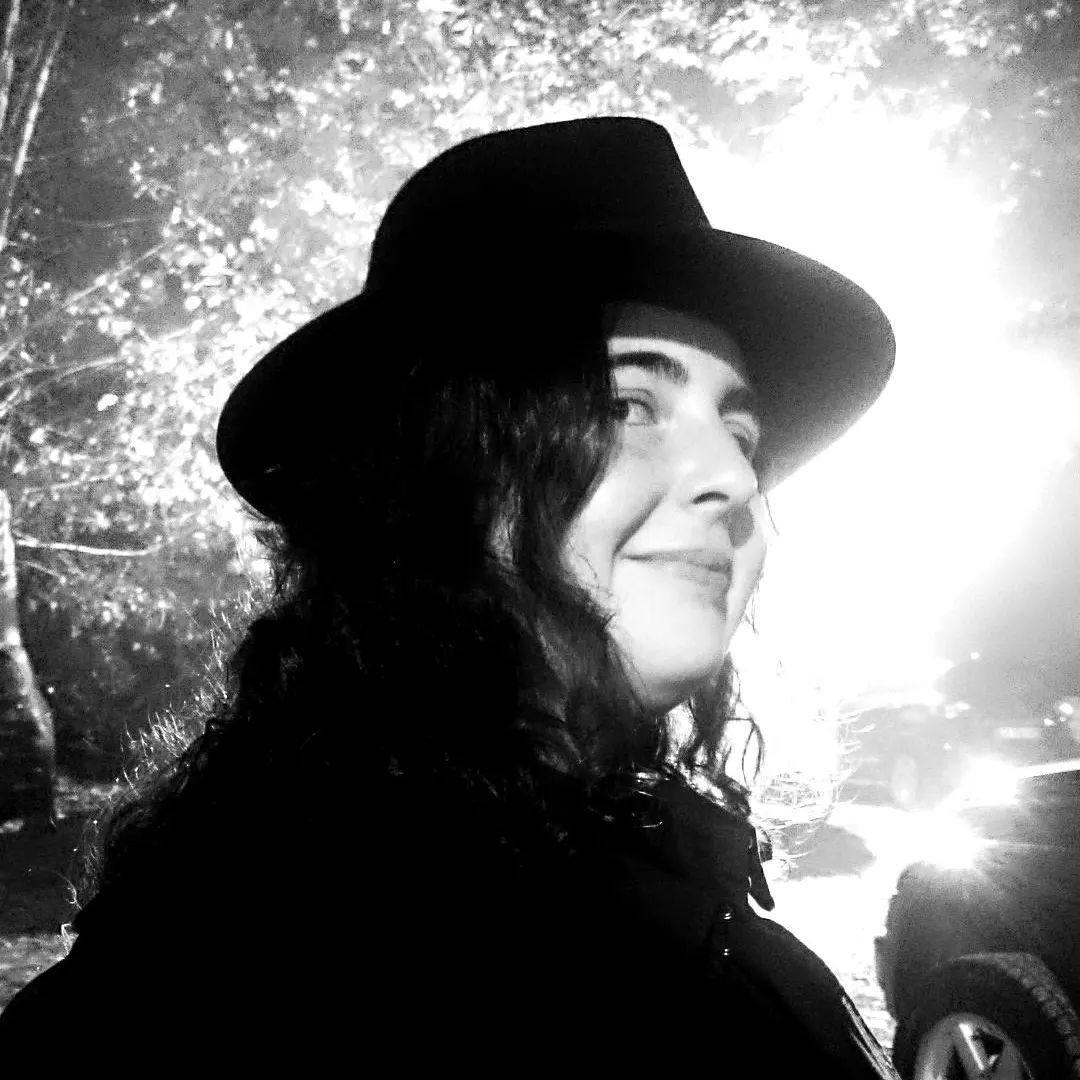
- Linda Lercari in Tuscany
- Born: Linda Lercari; 8 October 1972 (age 53); Metropolitan City of Genoa, Italy
- Education: Piccolo Teatro della Versilia, Living Theatre, Ensemble Studio Theatre
- Known for: Acting, Writing
- Movement: TOF – Testo Originale a Fronte
- Awards: San Domenichino di Massa

Linda Lercari (born 8 October 1972) is an Italian multimedia actress and author who writes short stories, fiction, poetry, political fiction, noir stories, gothic novels, and historical novels. Her most important novel is actually Kaijin. L'ombra di cenere, able to give her many literary awards and results, the last two ones in order of time are the third prize for edited novel at the San Domenichino di Massa, and the becoming Kaijin. L'ombra di cenere in September 2026 the most sold book in Amazon about the topic History of Japan.

== Life ==
Lercari was born in the Ligurian area to a Marshal of the Italian Navy father. She has been published by the editor HarperCollins – Italy. During 2015 Lercari won the first prize for single story at the San Domenichino di Massa.

She has an interest in Japan, practices the martial art of Kendo at the thirty-year Kendo School created in Lucca by Maurizio Lipparelli and has been an actress in the Next Artists company of Viareggio specializing in Shakespeare's texts in the original language.

She attended acting courses held by Federico Barsanti of the Piccolo Teatro della Versilia, Cathy Marchand of the Living Theater, and Mark Roberts of the Ensemble Studio Theater in New York.

Lercari is part of the TOF - Testo Originale a Fronte - a group of artists from Versilia.

== Selected works ==
Novels: Kaijin. L'ombra di cenere (2018), Sette_(novel) (2019) and Doveva essere un romanzo d'amore (2019).

Poetry: Poesie d`Osservazione, Poesie Crudeli and Il Vecchio e il Nuovo, the latter translated into japanese language with the title イル ヴェッキオ エ イル ヌオーヴォ. His poem L'amante Bianca is part of the anthology of the Luzi Foundation, 2015 edition.
