= Albergo (family) =

An Albergo (Alberghi in plural), in the Renaissance, was an organization in which several families linked by blood or a common interest banded together. The families derived economic, political, or military support from each other. They usually lived near each other and attended the same churches.

Alberghi developed among noble families in Genoa during the 13th and 14th centuries in response to economic difficulty and financial strife. Alberghi are first mentioned in 1383 by Giorgio Stella and Agostino Giustiniani on the occasion of the crowning of John of Lusignan as King of Cyprus by the Doge Leonardo Montaldo. Neither mentions the number of alberghi, though one 15th century source says there are 35 and a later source says there were 74 by the year 1414. The 28 alberghi that formed this new ruling class included the Cybo, Doria, Fieschi, Giustiniani, Grimaldi, Imperiale, Pallavicino, and Spinola families.

Alberghi mainly developed in Piedmont and Liguria. Alberghi are also mentioned as having formed in Chieri, Asti, Savigliano, and Borgo San Sepolcro; and to a lesser extent in Milan, Turin, and Moncalieri. By the 15th century, merchants and artisans were also forming alberghi, but this only affected a few of the more powerful families. Even freed slaves joined alberghi. Sometimes, these alberghi bonded together several branches of the same family. At other times, unrelated families with common interests banded together, typically taking a common surname. An example of the latter is the Giustiniani, which was composed of shareholders of a company formed to colonize the Greek island of Chios.

In 1528, after ousting the French and restoring Genoese independence, Andrea Doria reformed the constitution of the Republic of Genoa, attempting to unite the ‘nobili’ and ‘popularii’ factions into a single ruling class as formally recognized alberghi. Before this, alberghi had been strictly private institutions. This plan provided more political stability than before, but the old divisions reappeared. The alberghi were abolished in 1576 and noble families assumed their original surnames.

In Renaissance Venice, the term albergo originally referred to the building in which a Scuola Grande confraternity met. The term later applied only to a small meeting room within the building.

Today, albergo is the Italian word for a hotel. Both senses of the word are ultimately derived from a Germanic root, reconstructed as harjabergu meaning "barracks" or "lodging". The French word auberge shares the same origin.

== Sources ==
- Kirk, Thomas Allison. Genoa and the sea : policy and power in an early modern maritime republic, 1559-1684. Johns Hopkins University Press, 2005.
- Neel, Carol. Medieval families: perspectives on marriage, household, and children. The Medieval Academy of America, 2004, ISBN 0-8020-3606-6
