= Brignola =

Brignola is a surname. Notable people with the surname include:

- Enrico Brignola (born 1999), Italian footballer
- Nick Brignola (1936–2002), American jazz baritone saxophonist
