= Ingo della Volta =

Italian noble and politician (12th century)

Ingo (or Ingone) della Volta
- Born: late 11th century or early 12th century
- Died: after 1174
- Occupation: Politician

Ingo (or Ingone) della Volta (late 11th century or early 12th century – after 1174) was a Genoese politician, an authoritative figure in the political events of Genoa in the 12th century, at the head of one of the factions that dominated the consular municipality of Genoa and who contributed decisively to the Republic of Genoa's expansion in the Mediterranean.

He can be considered the progenitor of the powerful Genoese Della Volta family of viscount origin and also the maker of the change of the agnatic surname to Cattaneo.

== Biography ==
In the 12th century, della Volta was owner by feudal right of lands in Genoa and in the Bisagno valley. He was the recognized head of a consortium of related families and financed commercial enterprises in the East. In the first half of the 12th century, the Della Volta family were one of the five families of Genoa that alone controlled 80% of the trade between the Republic of Genoa and Syria.

Due to his authority he was repeatedly called to hold the office of Console de' placiti, magistrates in charge of the administration of justice in the Republic of Genoa. He was in office in 1134, 1139 and 1147. In this capacity he was the promoter of important legal innovations, such as the law that prohibited the stipulation of sales and pledge contracts between spouses or close relatives, Another of his laws prohibited citizens from buying real estate in the district territory from people who lived in or had married across borders.

In 1144 he managed to reach an agreement between Ugo and Guglielmo Embriaco who, following his intervention, then promised to put an end to mutual hostilities and to live in friendship with each other.

In 1146 he appears among the citizens who swore the agreement stipulated between the Republic of Genoa and the Count Ramon Berenguer IV of Barcelona for a common action against Almeria and Tortosa. He was probably also one of those who the following year financed the expedition against the Saracens. The campaign was part of the Reconquista.

== See also ==
- Republic of Genoa
