= Dario Brignole =

Argentine sports and broadcasting agent

- Born: Dario Brignole; 7 March 1968 (age 58); Buenos Aires, Argentina
- Occupations: Sports & Broadcasting agent
- Years active: 1994-present
- Employer: Shine Entertainment Media

Dario Brignole (born 7 March 1968 in Buenos Aires, Argentina) is a sports and broadcasting agent based in the United States of America who represents Hispanic and global talent, including Giovani and Jonathan dos Santos, ex players such as Gabriel Batistuta, Univision's Jorge Ramos, and others such as the influential Maria Elena Salinas from CBS Networks.

== Early career ==
Dario came to the US from Argentina to study an MBA at the University of Maryland College Park in 1994. The same year, he started his career in the sports industry with an unpaid internship at IMG's office in Washington D.C.

"I went to the Yellow Pages. … There were three companies: One was IMG, the other was SFX, and the other I think was [ProServ] … I sent a letter to all of them and started calling, and no one answered. I realized that IMG was literally three blocks from where I used to live. Pretty much, I started to show up and make friends in this really small IMG office. … I don’t know if I really ever got an offer like, “Yes, please come on Monday.” It was more like me showing up, all dressed up with a full suit." - Dario Brignole in 2012 on an interview with Sports Business Journal.

In IMG, Dario presented a Marketing plan in order to either bring IMG talent to Latin America, or try to find Argentinian talent to try to sell it overseas. Later on, IMG and Dario created the IMG Hispanic Division with the intention to promote Hispanic Talent in the US such as Lionel Messi.

During his time in IMG, Brignole, in a partnership venture effort with Raul de Quesada from Fox Pan American Sports (FPAS), collaborated to produce the 2nd Edition of Premios Fox Sports with the intention to reward in a big ceremony the different accomplishments of Hispanic athletes and clubs around the world.

== Shine Entertainment Media ==
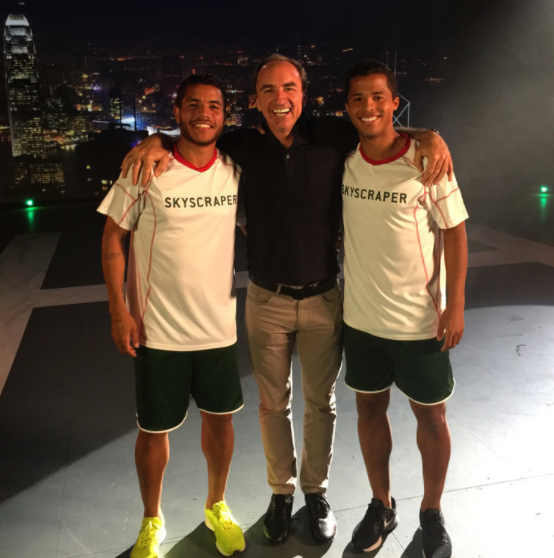
Dario Brignole during the Skyscraper shooting

After his longtime career in IMG, Dario Brignole decided to create his own Sports Marketing Agency called Shine Entertainment Media where he continued to work with Hispanic Talent such as Jorge Ramos from ESPN deportes and the Mexico National Team players Giovani and Jonathan dos Santos, Raul Jimenez, Miguel Layun, among others.

In 2012, Dario Brignole organized the World Soccer Masters exhibition game at the back in the day named Sun Life Stadium in Miami, FL that showcased more than 30 soccer stars around the world including the first time Lionel Messi played in US territory. During this time, Dario Brignole used to work with the Messi clan in global marketing deals with the purpose to build a brand around Messi's name like other big athletes such as LeBron James, Shaq O'Neill and Roger Federer.

In 2013–14, Jorge Ramos from ESPN deportes signed a multi-year endorsement deal with NAPA Auto Parts which was negotiated by his marketing agent Dario Brignole. The partnership was part of NAPA's efforts to reach males in the U.S. Hispanic market.

In 2018, Universal Pictures teamed up with Mexican star players Giovani and Jonathan dos Santos before the World Cup in Russia to promote their new movie film Skyscraper with Dwayne "The Rock" Johnson in order to attract the interest of the Hispanic and Mexican soccer fan.

== CNN contributor ==
Dario Brignole is one of the various CNN contributors by appearing in different CNN shows such as CNN dinero and CNN deportes talking about different sports topics such as the impact of 2020 coronavirus pandemic in the soccer clubs around the world, How will NCAA players make money through sponsorship deals, Tokyo 2020 Olympic Games, NFL in Latin America, How the Air Jordan brand became a lifestyle?, The number 1 tennis player in the world, Novak Djokovic, could lose his leadership and a lot of money, among others.
