= Steve Garbarino =

American journalist

- Born: Bryn Mawr, PA
- Citizenship: U.S.
- Education: University of South Florida
- Occupation: Contributing editor for The Wall Street Journal
- Spouse: Maddy Garbarino

Steve Garbarino is an American journalist, editor, and author of A Fitzgerald Companion: Libations, Destinations and Quotable Ruminations Favored by the Literary Mascot of the Jazz Age (Thornwillow Press, 2013). He is currently a contributing editor for Vanity Fair and a culture reporter for The Wall Street Journal.

== Career ==
Garbarino started his journalism career as a staff writer for The Times-Picayune, The Tampa Tribune and St. Petersburg Times. He was then the deputy features editor of The New York Post, the writer-at-large for Details, and the style director for Us Monthly.

In 2006, Garbarino joined BlackBook Magazine, a style and culture magazine in New York, as the editor-in-chief, where he oversaw a redesign and expansion to 10 issues a year. After BlackBook, Garbarino was editor-at-large of Maxim from 2008 to 2009. While there, he notably profiled Mickey Rourke who discussed his suicide attempt and sexual abuse as a child, which received attention from other publications.

He then joined Playboy as the editor-at-large, before joining The Wall Street Journal as a culture reporter. He is also a contributor to Vanity Fair, The New York Times, The New York Observer, and others. While at Vanity Fair, Garbarino profiled Robert Downey Jr. while the actor was in prison, as well as reclusive The Deer Hunter director Michael Cimino—in which Cimino's photograph was published for the first time in 20 years.
