= Cambiaso =

Cambiaso is an Italian surname. Notable people with the surname include:

- Adolfo Cambiaso (born 1975), Argentine polo player
- Andrea Cambiaso (born 2000), Italian football player
- Luigi Cambiaso (1895–1975), Italian gymnast
- Luca Cambiaso (1527–1585), also known as Cambiasi, Italian Renaissance painter
- Esteban Cambiasso (born 1980), Argentine football midfielder
- Nicolás Cambiasso (born 1978), Argentine football player, elder brother of Esteban Cambiasso
