= Franzoni =

Franzoni is an Italian surname. Notable people with the surname include:

- David Franzoni (born 1947), American screenwriter
- Enrico Franzoni (1920–2008), Swiss lawyer and politician
- Francesco Antonio Franzoni (1734–1818), Italian sculptor
- Giovanni Battista Franzoni (1928–2017), Italian dissident Catholic theologian
- Giovanni Franzoni (alpine skier) (born 2001), Italian World Cup alpine ski racer
