= Brignoli =

Brignoli is an Italian surname. Notable people with the surname include:

- Alberto Brignoli (born 1991), Italian footballer
- Ermanno Brignoli (born 1969), Italian cyclist
- Luca Brignoli (born 1983), Italian footballer
- Mario Brignoli (1902–1990), Italian racewalker
- Paolo Brignoli (1942–1986), Italian entomologist
- Pasquale Brignoli (1824–1884), Italian-born American opera singer
- Tommaso Brignoli (born 1999), Italian footballer

== See also ==
- Brignolia, a genus of goblin spiders
- Lawrence Brignolia (1876–1958), American long-distance runner and rower
