= Arsenio Frugoni =

Italian medieval historian (1914-1970)

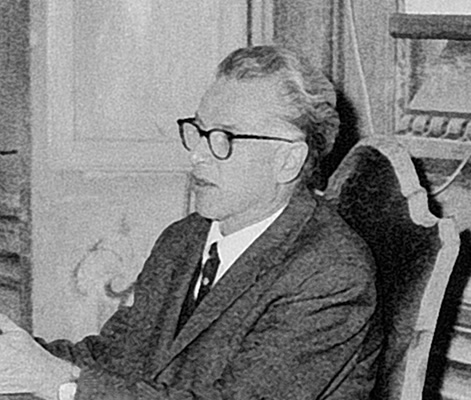
Arsenio Frugoni

Arsenio Frugoni (1914–1970) was an Italian medieval historian particularly noted for his influential and innovative work on medieval biography and religious studies.

== Education and career ==
Frugoni received his doctorate in 1938 from the elite Scuola Normale Superiore in Pisa and pursued post-graduate studies at the Italian Historical Institute for the Middle Ages (Istituto storico italiano per il medio evo) in Rome. In 1954, he returned to Pisa to teach medieval history at the Scuola Normale. In 1962, he was appointed to a chair in medieval history at the University of Rome, where he remained until his untimely death in 1970 at age 56.

== Intellectual influence ==
Frugoni is known principally for his contributions to the field of medieval biography and intellectual history, with a focus on the papacy and religious ideology. His most celebrated and influential work was his 1954 study of the twelfth-century political and religious reformer Arnold of Brescia. The Arnold book made a striking break with older historiographical approaches to biography and religious studies by asking how diverse contemporary authors in their texts constructed or imagined Arnold and his ideas based on their own contexts and agendas. In this way, he focused not on the individual himself, but, in an almost Rashomon-like fashion, the fragments and snippets of history that made up the image of the individual over time. In a subsequent collection of studies on the idiosyncratic hermit pope Celestine V, Frugoni used contemporary descriptions and discussions of Celestine to illuminate the theological and political controversies surrounding the papacy in the late thirteenth century. Frugoni also wrote extensively on Dante as a political and religious dissenter, as well as on the rise of humanism and its impact on the Italian Renaissance. When he died, he was working on a critical edition of Dante's letters that was published posthumously.

Many of Frugoni's ideas were more congruent with the French Annales School and its interest in historical mentalities, than with the traditional approaches that were current in the Italian academy during his career. Consequently, he never established what one might call a "school" of historical thought in Italy, with a cohort of students who continued his work, but his work did influence a number of European scholars who were inspired by his unique approach to the sources and the kinds of questions he asked. Carlo Ginzburg, for example, who studied with Frugoni in Pisa, has cited him as a major influence.

Frugoni's daughter, Chiara (1940-2022), followed in her father's footsteps and became a noted historian of medieval social history.

== Selected works ==
- (in Italian) Papato, Impero e Regni Occidentali (dal periodo carolingio a Innoncenzo III) (Florence, 1940).
- (in Italian) Incontri nel Rinascimento. Pagine di erudizione e di critica (Brescia, 1954).
- (in Italian) Gioacchino da Fiore, Adversos Iudeos, ed. A. Frugoni (Rome, 1957).
- (in Italian) Arnaldo da Brescia nelle fonti del secolo XII (Rome, 1954; repr. Torino 1989).
- (in Italian) Celestiniana (Rome, 1954; repr. 1991).
- (in Italian) Il giubileo di Bonifacio VIII (1950), ed. A. De Vincentiis (Rome, Bari 1999).
- (in Italian) "Dante e la Roma del suo tempo," in Dante e Roma, Atti del Convegno di studi, Roma 8-10 aprile 1965 (Florence, 1965), pp. 73–96.
- (in Italian) Il canto X dell'Inferno (Florence, 1967).
- (in Italian) Dante Alighieri, Le Epistole, ed. A. Frugoni (Milan & Naples, 1972).
- (in Italian) Incontri nel Medioevo (Bologna, 1979).
