= Benjamin A. Rogge =

American economist (1920–1980)

Benjamin A. Rogge (June 18, 1920 – November 17, 1980) was an American economist, college administrator, and libertarian writer, speaker and foundation advisor.

Rogge received an A.B. degree from Hastings College and an M.A. from the University of Nebraska. Rogge received his PhD in economics from Northwestern.

At Wabash College, Rogge taught in the summer Institute for Professional Development, in addition to his usual teaching in economics. Rogge co-authored an economics principles textbook with John Van Sickle. One strength of the text is the account that it gives of Joseph Schumpeter's process of creative destruction.

Rogge helped organize a series of lectures by Milton Friedman at Wabash that were eventually developed into Friedman's Capitalism and Freedom book. Much later, Rogge participated in a brainstorming session for Friedman's Free to Choose television series. Liberty Fund was founded with money from Pierre Goodrich, who sought advice from Rogge during the Fund's early years. Rogge served for many years as a Liberty Fund trustee. Thomas Sowell gives Rogge credit for encouraging him to write a book on economics and race. Rogge also was a frequent presenter at the seminars of the Foundation for Economic Education (FEE). FEE's founder, Leonard Read, thought of Rogge as Read's eventual successor, an outcome prevented by Read outliving Rogge. Rogge attended 13 meetings of the influential international Mont Pelerin Society. Rogge helped produce, and narrated, a documentary on Adam Smith that was funded by Liberty Fund. Rogge wrote the introduction to a collection of quotations from Adam Smith. A collection of Rogge's speeches, often on topics in economics or education, was published under the title Can Capitalism Survive?

Wabash College, where he taught for many years, named a lounge on the first floor of their academic building housing the economics department the Rogge Lounge in his honor. In addition, Wabash established and named a speaker series after Rogge to pay homage to his many contributions to university students and free market economics. Rogge's archives are mainly housed at the Hoover Institute on the campus of Stanford University. A posthumous collection of Rogge's speeches and essays has appeared under the title A Maverick's Defense of Freedom.
