= Pierre F. Goodrich =

American businessman and philanthropist (1894–1973)

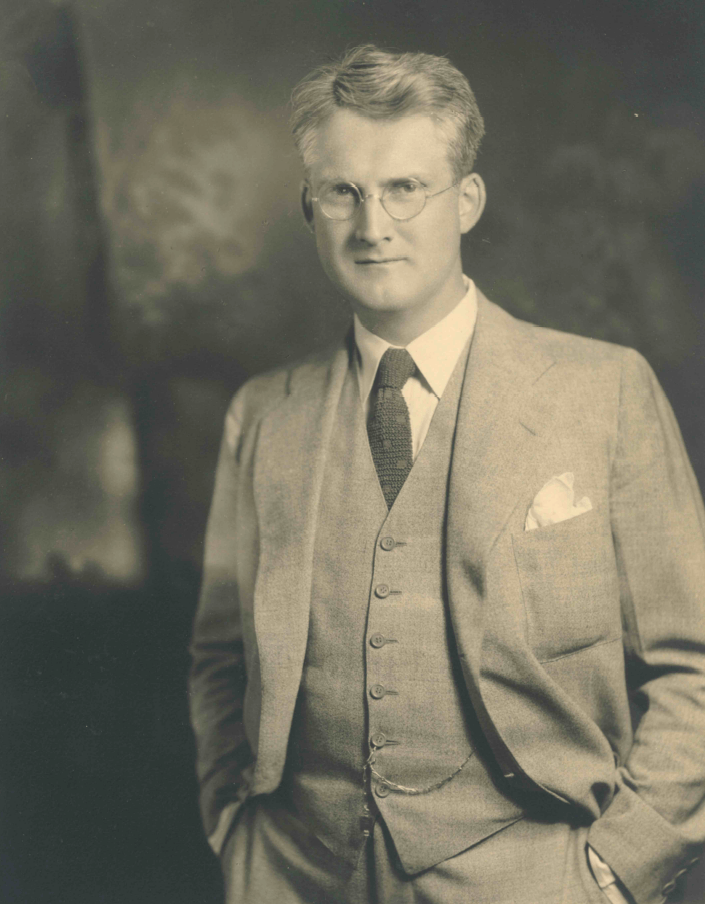
- Goodrich photographed c. 1920.
- Born: Pierre Frist Goodrich; September 10, 1894; Winchester, Indiana
- Died: October 25, 1973 (aged 79); Winchester, Indiana
- Occupations: Lawyer, businessman, philanthropist
- Known for: Founder of Liberty Fund
- Father: James P. Goodrich

Pierre Frist Goodrich (1894–1973) was an American businessman and conservative philanthropist.

== Biography ==
Pierre Frist Goodrich was born on September 10, 1894, in Winchester, Indiana. His father was James P. Goodrich, a successful businessman and the Republican Governor of Indiana from 1917 to 1921. He attended Wabash College and Harvard Law School.

He worked as a lawyer in Indianapolis, Indiana. He later took over his father's concerns, including the Indiana Telephone Company, Peoples Loan and Trust, and the Ayrshire Collieries Corporation.

He served on the boards of trustees of the Great Books Foundation, the Indianapolis Symphony Orchestra, the China Institute, the Intercollegiate Society of Individualists, the Foundation for Economic Education, and the Institute for Humane Studies. He was a member of the Mont Pelerin Society. He served on the Board of Trustees of his alma mater, Wabash College, from 1940 to 1969. As trustee, he advocated the Great Books curriculum popularized by Mortimer J. Adler and Robert Maynard Hutchins, which the school adopted in 1946. He also built the Goodrich Seminar Room in Wabash's main library, dedicated to liberty. However, he subsequently grew weary of the school's move towards an embrace of counterculture of the 1960s.

In the 1950s, he established two foundations to promote liberty, the Winchester Foundation and Thirty Five Twenty. In 1960, he founded the Liberty Fund, a free-market think tank headquartered in Indianapolis. He wrote Liberty Fund Basic Memorandum, a 129-page booklet with instructions on how to run the think tank.

In 1973, LibertyPress published Goodrich's essay "Education in a Free Society," co-authored with Benjamin A. Rogge.
