= John V. Van Sickle =

American economist

John Valentine Van Sickle (1892–1975) was a professor of economics at Vanderbilt University and Wabash College. He wrote and co-authored a number of articles on the economy of the American south. He also co-authored a principles of economics textbook with Benjamin Rogge. He was the author of Freedom in Jeopardy.
