= Willem Aarnoud van Citters =

Dutch politician

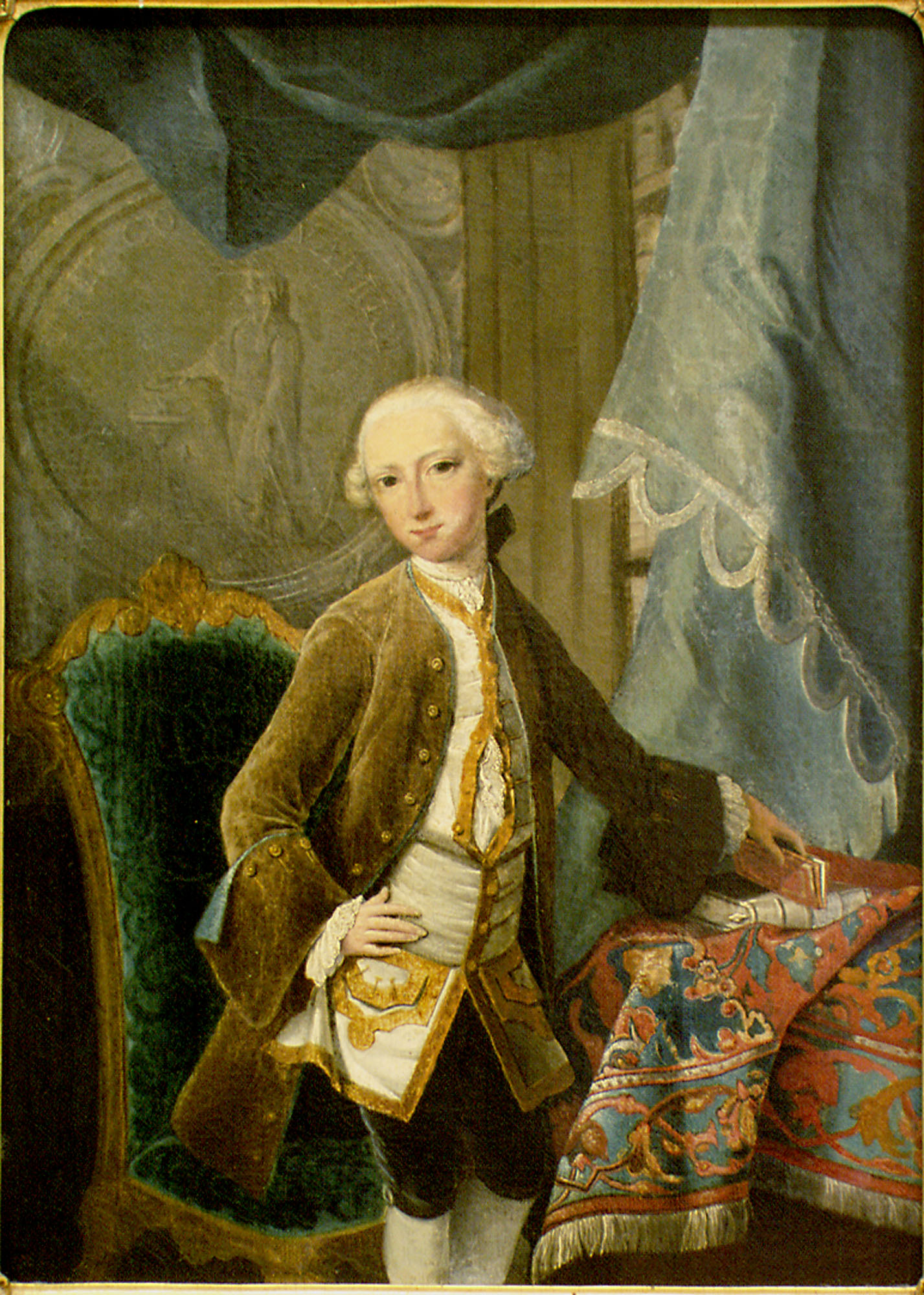
Willem Aarnoud van Citters

Willem Aarnoud or Aarnout van Citters (28 January 1741 – 22 September 1811) was a Dutch politician who served as the last Grand Pensionary of Zeeland. He was appointed to the role in 1788 (succeeding Laurens van de Spiegel) and held it until 1795, when the Dutch Republic was overthrown and replaced by the Batavian Republic.

== Life ==
He was born in Middelburg to Aarnout van Citters and Sara Jacoba Ockerse, making him a nephew of Wilhem van Citters, grand pensionary of Zeeland from 1760 to 1766. He served several roles in the government of Middelburg – councillor (1761–1793), schepen (1762–1786), treasurer (1769–1781) and mayor (1779, 1782, 1785 and 1788). He played a dominant role in Zeeland's Orange Party and was one of the authors of the 1787 Act of Obligation which aimed to organise the Orangists and suppress the Patriots. He was also involved in the negotiations at Nijmegen which aimed to put stadhouder William V, Prince of Orange back in power. He died in Arnemuiden in 1811.

== Sources ==
- Biografisch woordenboek der Nederlanden – van der Aa
- L.P. van de Spiegel (1737–1800) deel I & II – F.B. Schotanus
- Mr Johan van der Perre (1738–1790) – Dr H.J. Zuidervaart
