= Wilhem van Citters =

Dutch politician

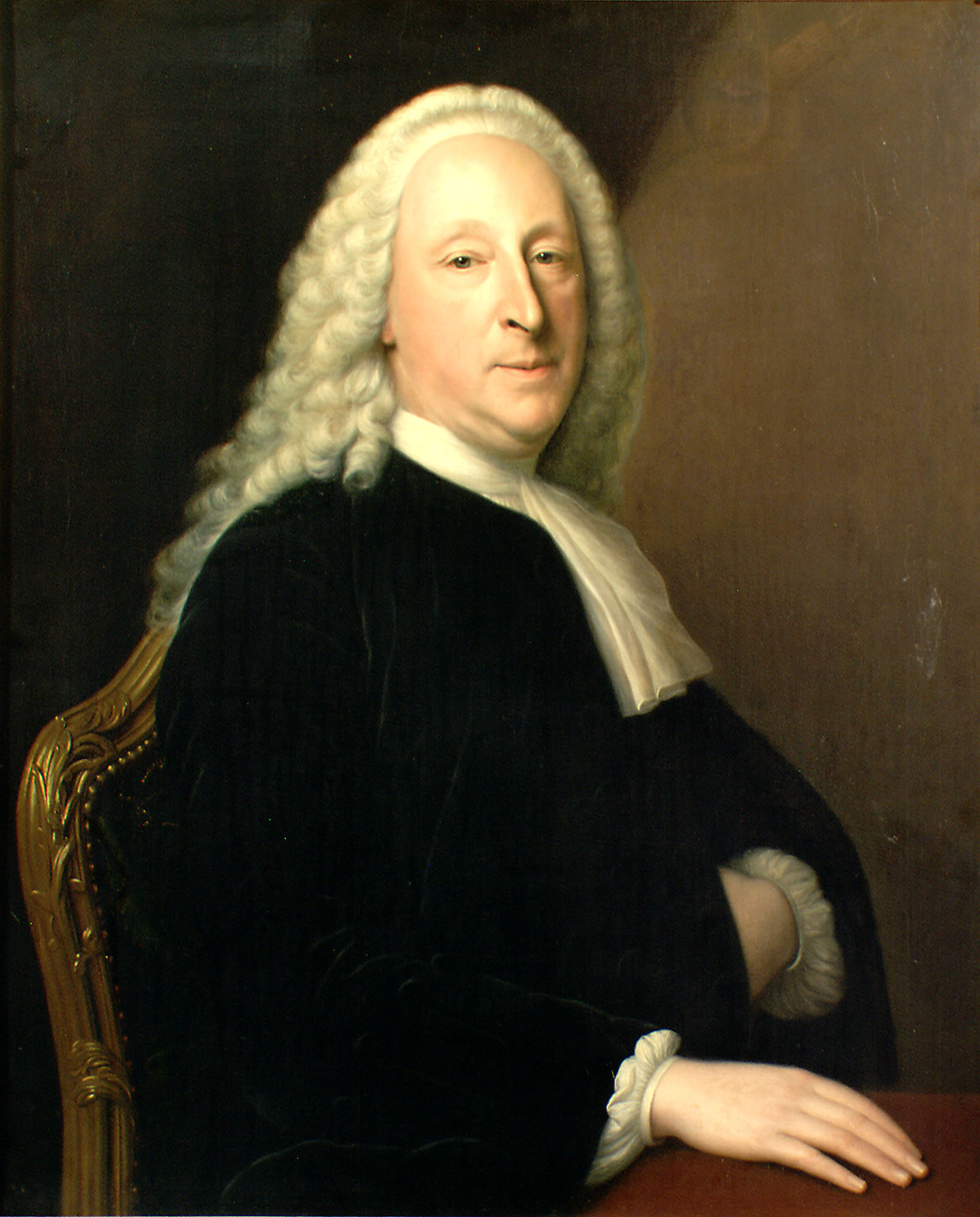
Wilhem van Citters

Wilhem (II) van Citters (25 May 1723 – 17 August 1802) was a Dutch politician, who served as grand pensionary of Zeeland from 1760 to 1766.

== Life ==
Born in Middelburg to Wilhem van Citters and Maria Kien, his uncle Caspar and nephew Willem Aarnoud were both also grand pensionaries of Zeeland. Wilhem II began his career in 1750 as pensionary of Middelburg, a role in which he also acted from 1752 to 1755 as one of the Republic's three plenipotentiary commissioners to the Barrier Treaty talks in Brussels. In 1757 he was appointed secretary of Zeeland and from 1753 to 1792 he was a 'principal participant' (i.e. commissioner) of the Dutch East India Company.

In 1764 Wilhem II became representative for the first nobility of Zeeland after the death of Johan (van Borssele) van der Hooghe – the role was similar to that of deputy of the Ridderschap or knighthood in Holland. Because of the rights of the towns of Veere and Vlissingen regarding the marquisate, the role had a significant influence on nominations for the State of Zeeland. Via the influence of William V, Wilhem II gave up the post of grand pensionary in 1766 and the followed year the duke of Brunswick confirmed him as representative for the first nobility. From then until 1786 he frequently counteracted the stadtholder and the duke of Brunswick wherever possible.

On the eve of the 4th Anglo-Dutch War Wilhem II offered the British delegate Yorke to pull Zeeland out of the Dutch Republic if Britain would then protect Zeeland's neutrality – Yorke rejected the offer. The town reconciled with William V after the duke of Brunswick's departure in 1783. Against protests from his former protege Laurens van der Spiegel, Wilhem II was made secretary as deputy to Thomas de Larrey. In 1790 he was appointed ontvanger-generaal or receiver-general of the Union. He died in the Hague in 1802.

== Sources ==
- Biografisch woordenboek der Nederlanden van der AA
- L.P. van der Spiegel (1737-1800) – F.B. Schotanus
- Mr Johan Adriaan van de Perre (1738-1790) – H.J. Zuidervaart
- Nederlandse revolutie van de achttiende eeuw 1780-1787 – C.H.E. de Wit
- Legatie archief Oostenrijkse Nederlanden- NA 1.10.110
