= Liberty Fund =

American private educational foundation

- Logo featuring the Sumerian word "Ama-gi", meaning "freedom"
- Founded: 1960; 66 years ago
- Founder: Pierre F. Goodrich
- Purpose: Educational
- Location: 11301 N. Meridian Street, Carmel, IN 46032
- Method: Publishing, conferences
- Website: libertyfund.org

Liberty Fund, Inc. is an American nonprofit foundation headquartered in Carmel, Indiana, that promotes the libertarian views of its founder, Pierre F. Goodrich, through publishing, conferences, and educational resources. The operating mandate of the Liberty Fund was set forth in an unpublished memo written by Goodrich "to encourage the study of the ideal of a society of free and responsible individuals".

== History ==
Liberty Fund was founded by entrepreneur Pierre F. Goodrich in 1960. Goodrich, "one of the richest men in Indiana", was involved with coal mines, corn production, telecommunications, and securities. Goodrich was a member of the Mont Pelerin Society, an international organization of academics, intellectuals, and business leaders who advocated free market economic policies. Goodrich was also influenced by the Austrian School economist Ludwig von Mises. Historian Donald T. Critchlow notes that the Liberty Fund was one of the endowed conservative foundations that paved the way for the election of US President Ronald Reagan in 1980.

In 1997, the fund received an $80 million donation from Goodrich's wife, Enid, increasing its assets to over $300 million. In November 2015, the fund announced the construction of a $22 million headquarters in Carmel, Indiana.

== Projects ==
The foundation has published several books covering history, politics, philosophy, law, education, and economics. These include:

- Liberty Fund's Natural Law and Enlightenment Series
- Alexis de Tocqueville's Democracy in America (Historical-Critical Edition) ISBN 978-0865978409
- The Works and Correspondence of Adam Smith (Glasgow Edition) ISBN 978-0865973695
- David Ricardo, On the Principles of Political Economy and Taxation, 2010. ISBN 978-0865979659
- The Works and Correspondence of David Ricardo (Edited by Piero Sraffa and Maurice Dobb, 2005) ISBN 978-0865979765

=== Conference program ===
Since its founding, Liberty Fund has hosted more than 6,000 small, Socratic conferences, holding these conferences primarily in North America, Europe, and Latin America. It has also held a small number of conferences in other regions of the world, including Asia, Australia, and North Africa. Conferences are organized primarily by scholars who work with Liberty Fund staff to establish a theme and select readings that explore certain aspects of liberty. Conference subject areas have included economics, history, philosophy, religion, literature, law, and, most recently, genomics and artificial intelligence.

Individual conferences cover a broad range of topics and themes, including political theory and history, economics, literature, fine arts, science and technology, and law. Authors and thinkers discussed include William Shakespeare, Miguel de Cervantes, Jane Austen, Mary Shelley, Mary Wollstonecraft, Fredrick Douglass, and economists Friedrich Hayek, Milton Friedman, and James Buchanan. Past conference titles include "Freedom and Rebellion in Dostoevsky's The Brothers Karamazov", "Wisdom, Knowledge and the Good Life", "Hobbes, Liberty, and the Rule of Law", "Liberty and Power in the Mexican Revolution", and "Civil Society in the Plague Year".

Major contributions to specific intellectual disciplines have been a series of conferences led by economists James Buchanan, Gordon Tullock, and Geoffrey Brennan on Public Choice Theory. Professor Henry Manne spearheaded conferences from the late 1970s to the early 2000s that made a considerable contribution to the field of Law and Economics. Scholars William B. Allen, Forrest McDonald, Lance Banning, Gordon S. Wood, and Jack P. Green have served as either directors or discussion leaders of dozens of conferences on the early history of the American Republic.

=== Publishing program ===
Liberty Fund's publishing program began in 1971 with the publication of Education in a Free Society, coauthored by Goodrich and Wabash College professor Benjamin A. Rogge, a founding director of Liberty Fund. Since then, Liberty Fund has published more than 400 books exploring the idea of liberty across many disciplines, including economics, political thought, American history, law, and education. Liberty Fund keeps in print many titles that would otherwise be unavailable.

Some of its most popular or influential publications include:

- The Federalist Papers by Alexander Hamilton, John Jay, and James Madison (ed. by George W. Carey and James McClellan)
- The Theory of Moral Sentiments by Adam Smith
- Leisure, the Basis of Culture by Josef Pieper
- Liberty, Order, and Justice by James McClellan
- Omnipotent Government by Ludwig von Mises

=== Liberty Fund Online ===
Besides its main website, the Liberty Fund hosts four websites, including:

- Law & Liberty focuses on the classical liberal tradition of how law and political thought shapes a society of free and responsible persons. Articles and commentary are offered by leading scholars covering a range of legal issues, legal philosophy, and pedagogy.
- The Online Library of Liberty is an extensive digital library of scholarly works focused on individual liberty and free markets. The OLL provides a curated collection of resources available at no charge. More than 2,000 works, often classic texts that are rare or unaffordable to most, are available for downloading.
- Adam Smith Works is an investigation of the scholarship of Adam Smith, the Scottish Enlightenment economist and philosopher. To further the exploration of Smith's works, Liberty Fund received a multi-million grant from the John Templeton Foundation in 2016 to spearhead conferences, host scholars, and create a website around Adam Smith's life and scholarship, notably Smith's Theory of Moral Sentiments (1759) and Wealth of Nations (1776). The website includes educational tools for use by elementary, middle school, high school, and college students. It includes Smith's Lectures on Jurisprudence and writings on astronomy, ancient logic, and ancient physics. (www.adamsmithworks.org)
- The Library of Economics and Liberty has its podcast EconTalk hosted by Russ Roberts long-time Stanford professor and current president of Jerusalem's Shalem College. For more than fifteen years, Roberts has interviewed several hundred scholars and thought leaders, including Mark Andreessen, Milton Friedman, Richard Epstein, Thomas Sowell, Cass Sunstein, Jeffrey Sachs, Anne Applebaum, Ronald Coase, Freeman Dyson, and Deirdre McCloskey.

=== Intellectual Portrait Series ===
Liberty Fund's Intellectual Portrait Series contains in-depth conversations with more than thirty of the world's leading academics in economics, political thought, law, and other disciplines. Liberty Fund also makes available detailed educational documentaries on Adam Smith and Friedrich Hayek and features historical overviews of the Industrial Revolution, Hong Kong, and the Constitution of the United States.

== Reception ==
After having participated to a study group on Frank Meyer's fusionism, National Review contributor and National Review Online's founding editor Jonah Goldberg said "The Liberty Fund is simply an amazing organization, dedicated to truth and study, good conversation and civil society and, of course, freedom".

In his book The Assault on Reason, former US vice president and Democratic presidential candidate Al Gore alleged that between 2002 and 2004, 97% of the attendees at Liberty Fund training seminars for judges were Republican administration appointees. Gore claimed that such conferences and seminars are one of the reasons that judges who regularly attend such conferences "are generally responsible for writing the most radical pro-corporate, anti-environmental, and activist decisions". Referring to what he calls the "Big Three"—the Foundation for Research on Economics and the Environment, George Mason University's Law & Economics Center, and the Liberty Fund—Gore adds his accusations: "These groups are not providing unbiased judicial education. They are giving multithousand-dollar vacations to federal judges to promote their radical right-wing agenda at the expense of the public interest."

== See also ==
- Economic liberalism
- Libertarian conservatism
- Libertarianism in the United States
- Right-libertarianism
