= Laurens Pieter van de Spiegel =

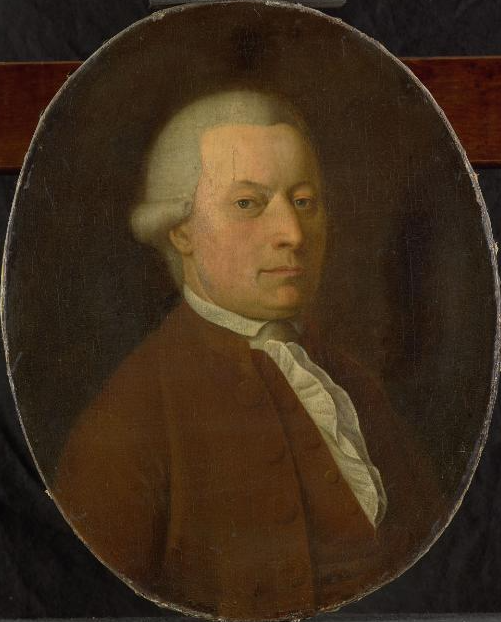
L. P. van de Spiegel

Laurens Pieter van de Spiegel (19 January 1736, in Middelburg – 7 May 1800, in Lingen) was Grand Pensionary of Zeeland and, from 9 November 1787 to 4 February 1795, of Holland. He was an Orangist, which means that he was a supporter of Prince William V of Orange. He became grand pensionary of Holland when the Prussian army had reinstated William V in power in 1787. He fled to Germany in 1795, when the French defeated the Dutch army and an anti-Orangist revolution broke out. He died in Lingen, Prussia. Van de Spiegel was the last Grand Pensionary of the Republic of the Seven United Netherlands, which was replaced with the Batavian Republic modelled after the French revolutionary state.

Laurens Pieter van de Spiegel was married to Digna Johanna Ossewaarde (1741–1813). The couple had eight children, one of them, jonkheer Cornelis Duvelaer van de Spiegel (1771–1829), was a member of parliament (1815–29) after the French era. Cornelis was ennobled by King William I in 1815.

Political offices
Preceded by Johan Marinus Chalmers	Grand Pensionary of Zeeland; 1785 –1787	Succeeded by Willem Aarnoud van Citters
Preceded by Pieter van Bleiswijk	Grand Pensionary of Holland; 1787 –1795	Position abolished
