= Dutch States Party =

Political faction of federalist republicans in the Netherlands during the Dutch Republic

Dutch States Party Staatsgezinde partij
- Ideology: Dutch republicanism; Provincial sovereignty; "True Freedom" (de Ware Vrijheid)

Party flag

The Dutch States Party (Dutch: Staatsgezinde partij, lit. 'Pro-States Party') was a republican political faction, and one of the two main factions of the Dutch Republic from the early 1600s to the mid-1700s. They favored the power of the regenten and opposed the Orangist "pro-prince" (prinsgezindheid) faction, who supported the monarchical aspirations of the stadtholders and the House of Orange-Nassau. (Note: In the days that there were stadtholders who were not members of that House, the factions did not yet exist.) The States Party was in the ascendancy during the First Stadtholderless Period (1650–1672) and the Second Stadtholderless Period (1702–1747).

They were supplanted as the leading republican faction by the more democratic Patriots (Patriotten) after the Orangist revolution of 1747. (Note: The States-party regenten were equally opposed to the democratic tendencies among the Patriots as the Orangist regenten.)

== Ideological characteristics ==
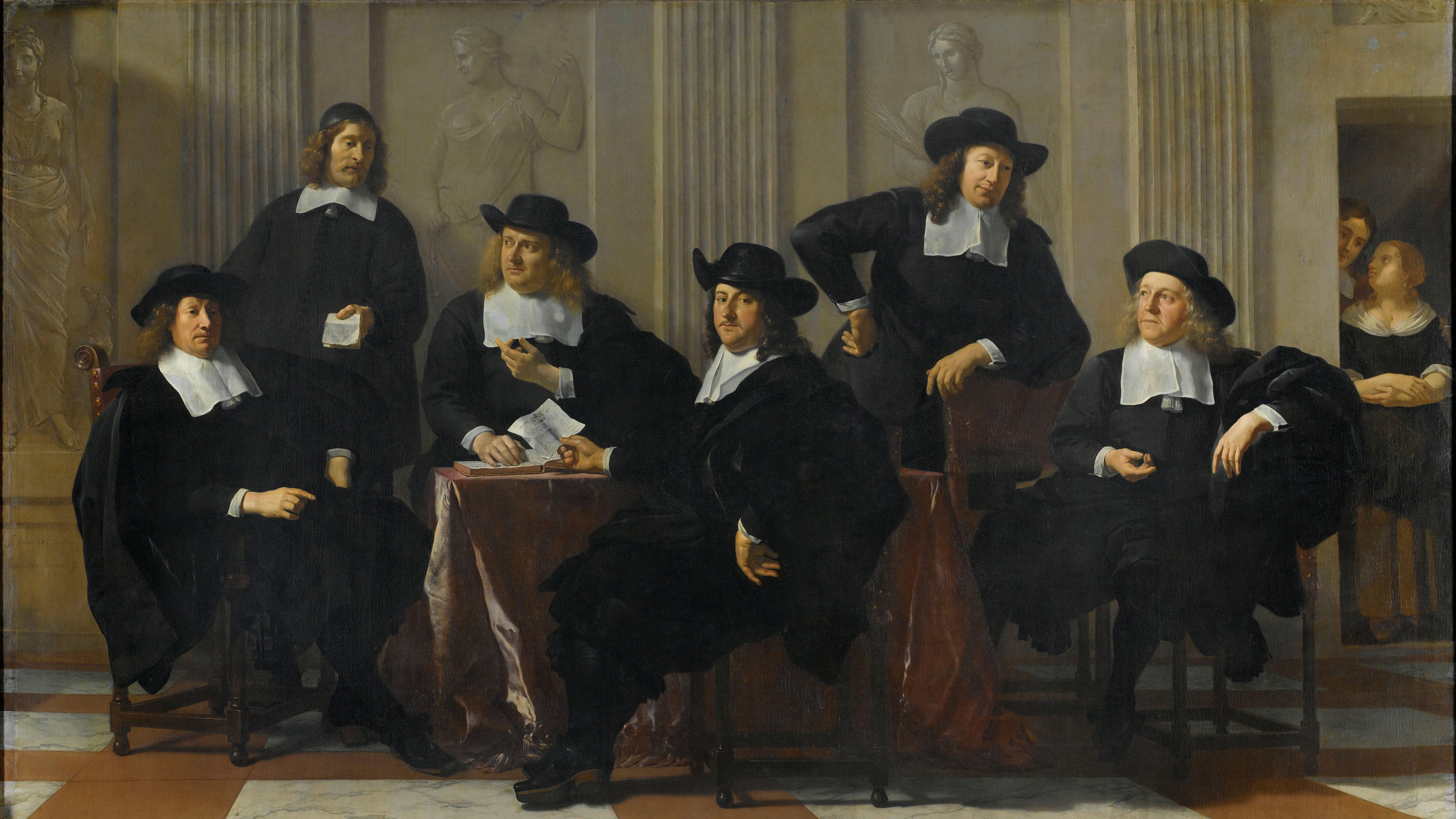
The wealthy regenten of the Republic were mostly aligned with the Dutch States Party

Unlike modern political parties, the States Party and the Orangists were not necessarily distinguished by ideology. At the provincial level, choice of sides was driven by the contest for power between members of the Regenten class. Local groups often simply adopted the opposite position taken by their factional opponents, a reality made more complex by the rivalry between individual provinces. There was little explicit ideological coherence, and what there was often changed over time.

However, since the days of the conflict between Maurice, Prince of Orange and Land's Advocate of Holland Johan van Oldenbarnevelt, (Note: At this time, the States Party was often referred to as the Loevesteiners, after the state prison at Loevestein, where the leaders of the Oldenbarnevelt faction had been incarcerated)) the States Party stood for provincial sovereignty, vested in the provincial States like the States of Holland, whereas the Orangists emphasised "supra-provincial" sovereignty, residing in the States-General of the Netherlands.

The supremacy of the provincial States was first defended by François Vranck in his debate with Thomas Wilkes in 1587 during the rule of the Earl of Leicester as governor-general under the English protectorate, and later taken up by Hugo Grotius in his De antiquitate reipublicae Batavicae (On the Antiquity of the Batavian Republic). (Note: During their trial for treason the Loevesteiners disputed the competency of the ad hoc court that tried them on the ground that the court had been established by the States-General in an usurpation of the sovereignty of the States of Holland.) The theme was taken up again during the conflict between stadtholder William II and the States of Holland (tuled by the Amsterdam regents like the Bicker family) in 1650, in which first the Prince prevailed, and after his death the States, ushering in the "True Freedom" of the First Stadtholderless Period.

The doctrine of "True Freedom" was expounded by political philosophers like the Grand Pensionary Johan de Witt in his "Deduction" and Pieter de la Court in his the Interest van Holland (Interest of Holland) and De stadthouderlijcke regeeringe in Hollandt ende West-Vrieslandt (History of the stadholders of Holland and West-Friesland). In these works the doctrine was extended into a distinctly anti-monarchical and pro-republican direction as a justification for the de facto abolition of the office of stadtholder in most provinces as "superfluous" and "positively harmful to the general welfare.."

== Notable representatives ==
Some of the most important representatives of the States Party in the history of the Republic were:

=== Amsterdam Arminian clique ===
1610s–1630s

- Jacob Dircksz de Graeff

=== Bickerse League ===
1630s–1650

- Andries Bicker
- Cornelis Bicker
- Adriaan Pauw (partially)

=== Loevesteiners ===
1650

- Johan van Oldenbarnevelt
- Hugo Grotius
- Gilles van Ledenberg
- Jacob de Witt

=== First Stadtholderless Period ===
1650–1672

- Johan de Witt
- Cornelis de Witt
- Cornelis de Graeff
- Andries de Graeff
- Johan Huydecoper van Maarsseveen

=== Second Stadtholderless Period ===
1702–1747

- Anthonie Heinsius
- Isaac van Hoornbeek
- Simon van Slingelandt
- Anthonie van der Heim
- Willem Buys
- Jacob Gilles
