= 1655 =

1655 in various calendars
- Gregorian calendar: 1655; MDCLV
- Ab urbe condita: 2408
- Armenian calendar: 1104; ԹՎ ՌՃԴ
- Assyrian calendar: 6405
- Balinese saka calendar: 1576–1577
- Bengali calendar: 1061–1062
- Berber calendar: 2605
- English Regnal year: 6 Cha. 2 – 7 Cha. 2 (Interregnum)
- Buddhist calendar: 2199
- Burmese calendar: 1017
- Byzantine calendar: 7163–7164
- Chinese calendar: 甲午年 (Wood Horse); 4352 or 4145 — to — 乙未年 (Wood Goat); 4353 or 4146
- Coptic calendar: 1371–1372
- Discordian calendar: 2821
- Ethiopian calendar: 1647–1648
- Hebrew calendar: 5415–5416
- Hindu calendars
- Vikram Samvat: 1711–1712
- Shaka Samvat: 1576–1577
- Kali Yuga: 4755–4756
- Holocene calendar: 11655
- Igbo calendar: 655–656
- Iranian calendar: 1033–1034
- Islamic calendar: 1065–1066
- Japanese calendar: Jōō 4 / Meireki 1 (明暦元年)
- Javanese calendar: 1577–1578
- Julian calendar: Gregorian minus 10 days
- Korean calendar: 3988
- Minguo calendar: 257 before ROC 民前257年
- Nanakshahi calendar: 187
- Thai solar calendar: 2197–2198
- Tibetan calendar: ཤིང་ཕོ་རྟ་ལོ་ (male Wood-Horse); 1781 or 1400 or 628 — to — ཤིང་མོ་ལུག་ལོ་ (female Wood-Sheep); 1782 or 1401 or 629

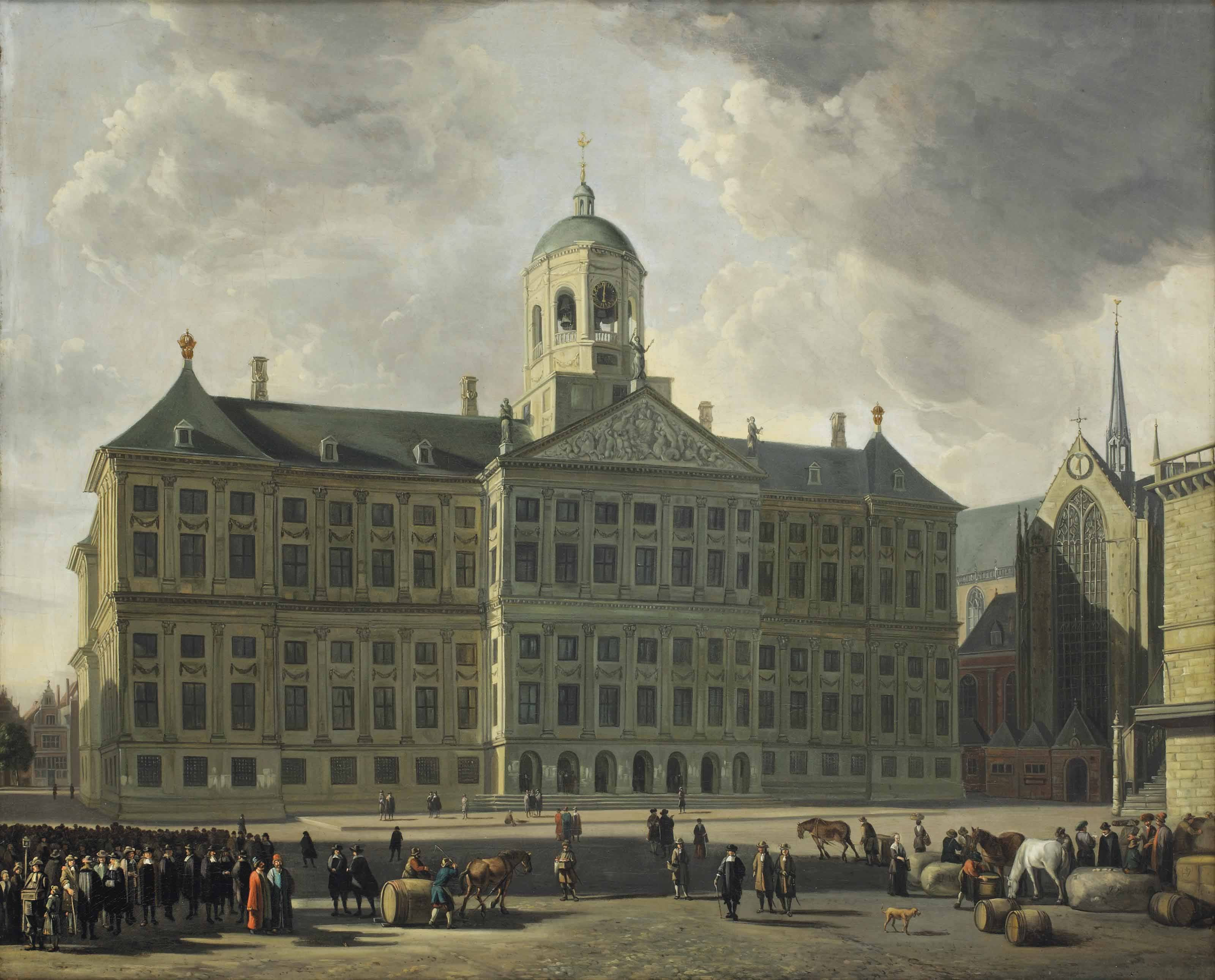
July 20: The Amsterdam Town Hall (now the Royal Palace of the Netherlands) is inaugurated.

1655 (MDCLV) was a common year starting on Friday of the Gregorian calendar and a common year starting on Monday of the Julian calendar, the 1655th year of the Common Era (CE) and Anno Domini (AD) designations, the 655th year of the 2nd millennium, the 55th year of the 17th century, and the 6th year of the 1650s decade. As of the start of 1655, the Gregorian calendar was 10 days ahead of the Julian calendar, which remained in localized use until 1923.

== Events ==
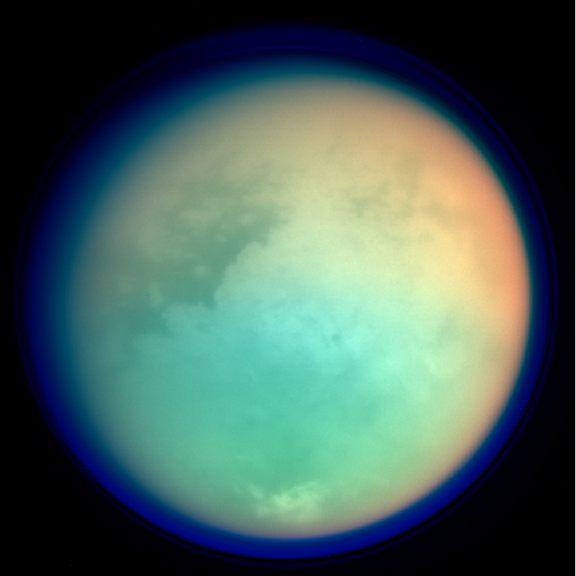
March 25: Titan, the largest moon of Saturn, is discovered.

=== January–March ===
- January 5 – Emperor Go-Sai ascends to the throne of Japan.
- January 7 – Pope Innocent X, leader of the Roman Catholic Church and the Papal States, dies after more than 10 years of rule.
- February 14 – The Mapuches launch coordinated attacks against the Spanish in Chile, beginning the Mapuche uprising of 1655.
- February 16 – Dutch Grand Pensionary advisor Johan de Witt marries Wendela Bicker.
- March 8 – John Casor becomes the first legally recognized slave in what will become the United States, as a court in Northampton County in the Colony of Virginia issues its decision in the Casor lawsuit, the first instance of a judicial determination in the Thirteen Colonies holding that a person who has committed no crime could be held in servitude for life.
- March 25 – Saturn's largest moon, Titan, is discovered by Christiaan Huygens.

=== April–June ===
- April 4 – Battle of Porto Farina, Tunis: English admiral Robert Blake's fleet defeats the Barbary pirates.
- April 7 – Pope Alexander VII (born Fabio Chigi) succeeds Pope Innocent X, as the 237th pope.
- April 24 – The Piedmontese Easter Massacre of the Waldensians: Charles Emmanuel II, Duke of Savoy slaughters 1,500 men, women and children; this is memorialized in John Milton's sonnet "On the Late Massacre in Piedmont" and apologized for by Pope Francis in 2015.
- April 26 – The Dutch West India Company denies Peter Stuyvesant's request to exclude Jews from New Amsterdam (Manhattan).
- April 28 – Admiral Blake severely damages the arsenal of the Bey of Tunis.
- May 10–27 – Anglo-Spanish War: Invasion of Jamaica – Forces of the English Protectorate led by William Penn and Robert Venables capture the island of Jamaica from Spain.
- June 13 – Adriana Nooseman-van de Bergh becomes the first actress, in Amsterdam theater.

=== July–September ===
- July 20 – The Amsterdam Town Hall (the modern-day Royal Palace) is inaugurated.
- July 27
  - The Jews in New Amsterdam petition for a separate Jewish cemetery.
  - The Netherlands and Brandenburg sign a military treaty.
- July 30 – Dutch troops capture Fort Assahudi Seram.
- July 31 – Russo-Polish War (1654–67): The Russian army enters the capital of the Grand Duchy of Lithuania, Vilnius, which it holds for 6 years.
- August 9 – Lord Protector Oliver Cromwell divides England into 11 districts, under major-generals.
- August 28 – New Amsterdam and Peter Stuyvesant bar colonial Jews from military service.
- August – The governor of New Netherland, Peter Stuyvesant, attacks the New Sweden (Delaware) colony.
- September 8 – Swedish King Karl X Gustav occupies Warsaw (Poland).
- September 26 – Peter Stuyvesant recaptures the Dutch Fory Casimir, and defeats the New Sweden (Delaware) colony.

=== October –December ===
- October 15 – The Jews of Lublin are massacred.
- October 19 – Swedish King Karl X Gustav occupies Kraków (Poland).
- November 3 – England and France sign military and economic treaties.
- November 24 – English Lord Protector Oliver Cromwell announces measures against the Laudian party, which are enforced starting on January 1.
- December 4 – Middelburg, the Netherlands forbids the building of a synagogue.
- December 18 – The Whitehall Conference ends with the determination that there is no law preventing Jews from re-entering England after the Edict of Expulsion of 1290.
- December 27 – Second Northern War/the Deluge: Monks at the Jasna Góra Monastery in Częstochowa are successful in fending off a month-long siege.

=== Date unknown ===
- Stephan Farffler, a 22-year-old paraplegic watchmaker, builds the world's first self-propelling chair on a three-wheel chassis using a system of cranks and cogwheels. However, the device has the appearance of a hand bike more than a wheelchair since the design includes hand cranks mounted at the front wheel.
- The Bibliotheca Thysiana is erected, the only surviving 17th century example in the Netherlands, of a building designed as a library.
- 1655 Malta plague outbreak kills 20 people.
- Frederick III of Denmark-Norway gives control of the Faroe Islands to Christoffer Gabel and his son, which will last until 1709.

== Births ==
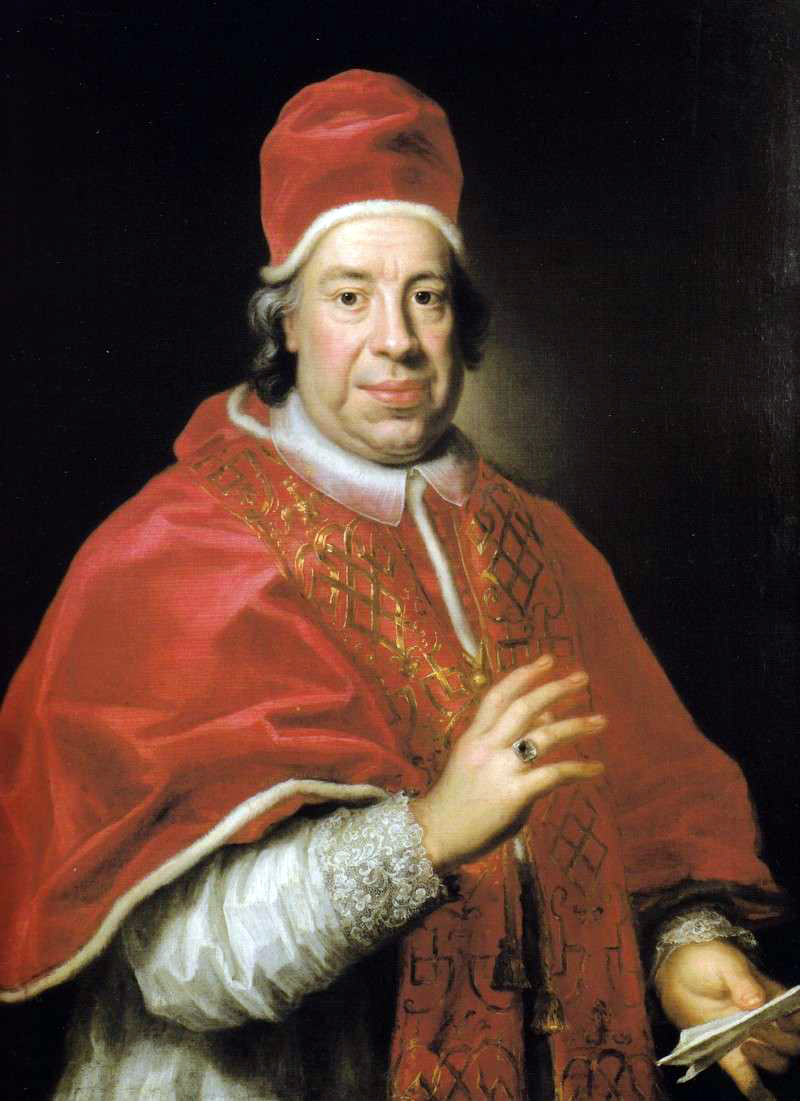
Pope Innocent XIII

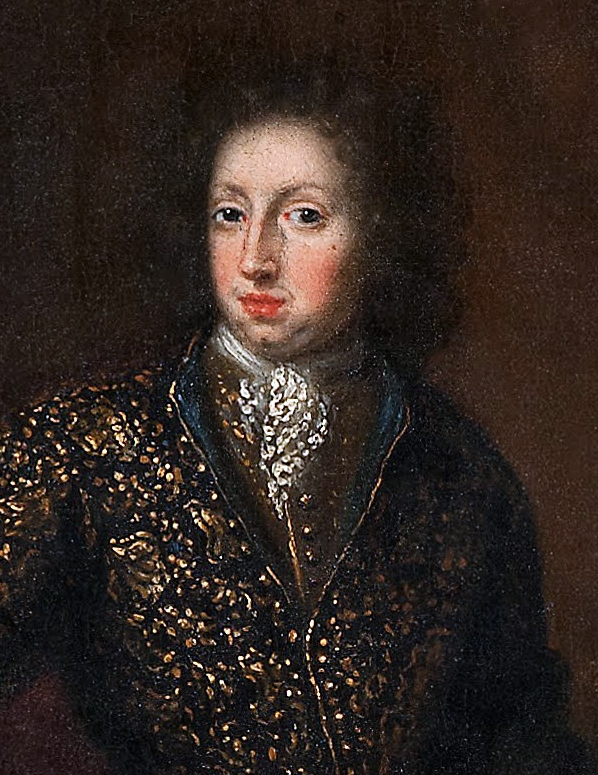
Charles XI of Sweden

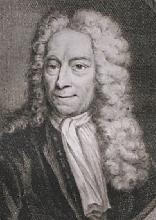
Isaac van Hoornbeek

- January 1 – Christian Thomasius, German jurist (d. 1728)
- January 5 – John Coney (silversmith), early American silversmith/goldsmith (d. 1722)
- January 6
  - Niccolò Comneno Papadopoli, Italian jurist of religious law and historian (d. 1740)
  - Eleonor Magdalene of Neuburg, Holy Roman Empress (d. 1720)
- January 11
  - Charles Sergison, English politician (d. 1732)
  - Henry Howard, 7th Duke of Norfolk, England (d. 1701)
- January 13 – Bernard de Montfaucon, French Benedictine monk (d. 1741)
- January 19 – Nalan Xingde, Chinese poet (d. 1685)
- January 21 – Antonio Molinari, Italian painter (d. 1704)
- January 25 – Cornelius Anckarstjerna, Dutch-born Swedish admiral (d. 1714)
- January 27 – Henri de Nesmond, French churchman (d. 1727)
- February 2 – William "Tangier" Smith, Moroccan mayor (d. 1705)
- February 7 – Jean-François Regnard, French comic poet (d. 1709)
- February 14 – Jacques-Nicolas Colbert, French churchman (d. 1707)
- February 15 – August, Duke of Saxe-Merseburg-Zörbig, German prince (d. 1715)
- February 16 – Charles, Electoral Prince of Brandenburg, German prince (d. 1674)
- February 25 – Carel de Moor, Dutch painter (d. 1738) (Note: Arnold Houbraken mentioned erroneously 1656 as his birth in the book De groote schouburgh der Nederlantsche konstschilders en schilderessen, but the correct date is 1655.)
- February 28 – Johann Beer, Austrian composer (d. 1700)
- March 4 – Fra Galgario, Italian painter (d. 1743)
- March 6 – Frederik Krag, Danish nobleman and senior civil servant (d. 1728)
- March 23
  - Richard Hill of Hawkstone, English statesman (d. 1727)
  - Sir Richard Myddelton, 3rd Baronet, English politician (d. 1716)
- April 8 – Louis William, Margrave of Baden-Baden, Germany (d. 1707)
- April 19 – George St Lo, Royal Navy officer and administrator (d. 1718)
- April 25 – John Lowther, 1st Viscount Lonsdale, English politician (d. 1700)
- April 26
  - Rinaldo d'Este (1655–1737), Duke of Modena (d. 1737)
  - Ofspring Blackall, Bishop of Exeter (d. 1716)
- May 4 – Bartolomeo Cristofori, Italian maker of musical instruments, invented the piano (d. 1731)
- May 13 – Pope Innocent XIII (d. 1724)
- May 31 – Jacques Eléonor Rouxel de Grancey, Marshal of France (d. 1725)
- June 4 – Thomas of Cori, Italian Friar Minor and preacher (d. 1729)
- June 11 – Antonio Cifrondi, Italian painter (d. 1730)
- June 12 – Ernest, Duke of Saxe-Hildburghausen (d. 1715)
- July 7 – Christoph Dientzenhofer, German architect (d. 1722)
- July 20 – Ford Grey, 1st Earl of Tankerville, England (d. 1701)
- August 2 – Sir John Hotham, 3rd Baronet, English politician (d. 1691)
- August 13 – Johann Christoph Denner, German musical instrument maker, invented the clarinet (d. 1707)
- August 16 – Frederick Christian, Count of Schaumburg-Lippe (d. 1728)
- August 18 – James Collett, English-born merchant who settled in Norway (d. 1727)
- August 22 – Joseph Robineau de Villebon, governor of Acadia (d. 1700)
- September 2 – Andries Pels, Dutch banker (d. 1731)
- September 9 – James Johnston (secretary of state), diplomat, Secretary of State for Scotland (d. 1737)
- September 12 – Sébastien de Brossard, French composer and music theorist (d. 1730)
- September 14 – Éléonor Marie du Maine du Bourg, French nobleman and general (d. 1739)
- September 21 – Roger Cave, English politician (d. 1703)
- September 29 – Johann Ferdinand of Auersperg, Duke of Münsterberg (d. 1705)
- September 30 – Charles III, Prince of Guéméné, French nobleman (d. 1727)
- October 4 – Lothar Franz von Schönborn, Archbishop of Mainz (d. 1729)
- October 12 – Richard Neville (the younger), English politician (d. 1717)
- October 25 – Fabio Brulart de Sillery, French churchman (d. 1714)
- November 1 – Ferdinand Kettler, Duke of Courland and Semigallia (d. 1737)
- November 6 – Daniel Lascelles (1655–1734), English Member of Parliament (d. 1734)
- November 12
  - Eustache Restout, French painter (d. 1743)
  - Francis Nicholson, British Army general, colonial administrator (d. 1727)
- November 16 – Alessandro Gherardini, Italian painter (d. 1726)
- November 18 – Walter Norborne, English politician (d. 1684)
- November 19 – Sir William Robinson, 1st Baronet, British politician (d. 1736)
- November 20 – Sir Thomas Grosvenor, 3rd Baronet, English politician (d. 1700)
- November 24 – King Charles XI of Sweden (d. 1697)
- December 9 – Isaac van Hoornbeek, Grand Pensionary of Holland (d. 1727)
- December 10 – Sir William Forester, British politician (d. 1718)
- December 13 – John Evelyn the Younger, English translator (d. 1699)
- December 14 – Philip, Landgrave of Hesse-Philippsthal, son of William VI (d. 1721)
- December 27 – Abstrupus Danby, English politician (d. 1727)
- December 28 – Charles Cornwallis, 3rd Baron Cornwallis, First Lord of the British Admiralty (d. 1698)
- December 29 – Lewis Watson, 1st Earl of Rockingham, English politician (d. 1724)
- date unknown – Zumbi, runaway slave in Brazil (d. 1695)

== Deaths ==
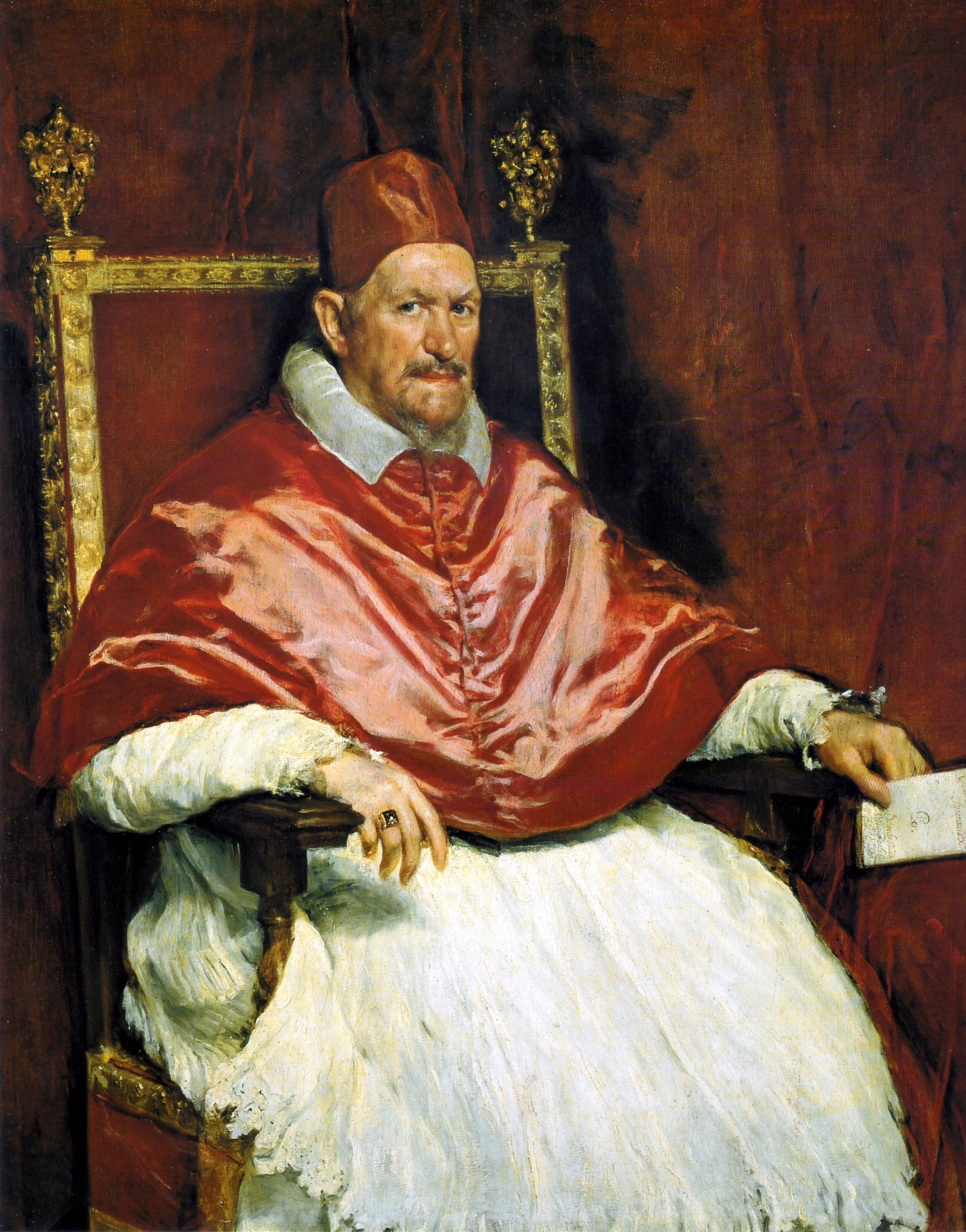
Pope Innocent X

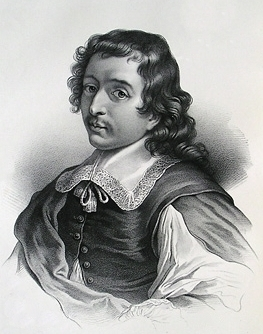
Eustache Le Sueur

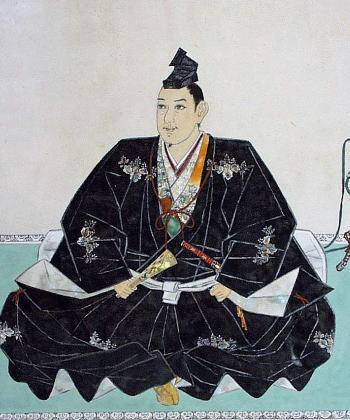
Ukita Hideie

- January 6 – Louis Philip, Count Palatine of Simmern-Kaiserslautern, Prince of Paltinate (b. 1602)
- January 7 – Pope Innocent X (b. 1574)
- February 15 – Pier Luigi Carafa, Italian Catholic cardinal (b. 1581)
- February 21 – John X of Schleswig-Holstein-Gottorp, Prince-Bishop of Lübeck (1634–1655) (b. 1606)
- February 25 – Daniel Heinsius, Flemish scholar (b. 1580)
- February 27 – Francesco Molin, Doge of Venice (b. 1575)
- March 28 – Maria Eleonora of Brandenburg, German princess and queen consort of Sweden (b. 1599)
- March 30 – James Stewart, 1st Duke of Richmond (b. 1612)
- April 6 – David Blondel, French Protestant clergyman (b. 1591)
- April 14 – Johann Erasmus Kindermann, German composer and organist (b. 1616)
- April 29 – Cornelis Schut, Flemish painter, draughtsman and engraver (b. 1597)
- April 30 – Eustache Le Sueur, French painter (b. 1617)
- May 5 – Richard Harrison, English politician (b. 1583)
- May 8 – Edward Winslow, American Pilgrim leader (b. 1596)
- May 30 – Christian, Margrave of Brandenburg-Bayreuth (b. 1581)
- June 26 – Margaret of Savoy, Vicereine of Portugal (b. 1589)
- June 27 – Eleonora Gonzaga, Holy Roman Empress, married to Ferdinand II, Holy Roman Emperor (b. 1598)
- June 30 – Jacobus Boonen, Dutch Catholic archbishop (b. 1573)
- July 15 – Girolamo Rainaldi, Italian architect (b. 1570)
- July 28
  - Cyrano de Bergerac, French soldier and writer (b. 1619)
  - Suzuki Shōsan, Japanese samurai (b. 1579)
- July 30 – Sigmund Theophil Staden, important early German composer (b. 1607)
- August 10 – Alfonso de la Cueva, 1st Marquis of Bedmar, Spanish cardinal and diplomat (b. 1572)
- September 7 – François Tristan l'Hermite, French dramatist (b. 1601)
- September 24 – Frederick, Landgrave of Hesse-Eschwege (b. 1617)
- October 13 – Tobie Matthew, English Member of Parliament (b. 1577)
- October 14 – Arnold Möller, German calligrapher (b. 1581)
- October 16 – Joseph Solomon Delmedigo, Italian physician, mathematician and music theorist (b. 1591)
- October 18 – Joachim Lütkemann, German theologian (b. 1608)
- October 24 – Pierre Gassendi, French philosopher, mathematician, and scientist (b. 1592)
- November 3 – Paulus Aertsz van Ravesteyn, Dutch printer (born c. 1586)
- November 6 – Maximilian, Prince of Dietrichstein, German prince (b. 1596)
- November 16 – Giuseppe Marcinò, Italian priest, member of the Order of Friars Minor (b. 1589)
- November 23 – Elizabeth Wriothesley, Countess of Southampton (b. 1572)
- November 28 – John Oglander, English politicians (b. 1585)
- December 17 – Ukita Hideie, Japanese daimyō (b. 1573)
- December 20 – Gregers Krabbe, Danish noble (b. 1594)
- December 22 – Tsugaru Nobuyoshi, Japanese daimyō (b. 1619)
- December 31 – Sir John Wray, 2nd Baronet, English politician (b. 1586)
- date unknown – Kocc Barma Fall, Senegambian philosopher (b. 1586)
