= François Vranck =

Dutch statesman and jurist

François Vranck (alternative spellings Vrancke, Vrancken, Franchois Francken), (Zevenbergen, 1555? – The Hague, 11 October 1617) was a Dutch lawyer and statesman who played an important role in the founding of the Dutch Republic. He is commonly known for his 1587 treatise, the Deduction of Vrancken, commissioned by the States of Holland in order to assert their sovereignty over the County of Holland.

== Family life ==
Vranck was the son of Gielis Vrancken, a burgomaster of his native Zevenbergen. He studied law, probably abroad, and practiced law before the Hof van Holland (high court of the province of Holland) since 1578. He married twice. The name of his first wife apparently has been lost, but he remarried in 1615 with Elisabeth van Westerbeek, daughter of Nicolaas van Westerbeek, Lord of Katendrecht, and Margaretha van Roon. He died without issue.

== Career ==
In 1583 he was appointed pensionary of the city of Gouda, which he henceforth represented in the States of Holland. Here he became a close ally of the Land's Advocate of Holland, Johan van Oldenbarnevelt. Vrancke was very much opposed to the attempts of the States-General of the Netherlands to procure a new sovereign, after the departure of the Duke of Anjou. When the Treaty of Nonsuch nevertheless introduced a kind of English protectorate over the budding republic, with the arrival of the Earl of Leicester and English representatives on the Council of State of the Netherlands, Vrancke became one of the fiercest opponents of English influence and policies. Leicester encouraged the extreme Calvinist and democratic faction in the Republic's politics against the Regenten, of which Vranck was a leader.

=== The Deduction ===
In 1587 one of the English members of the Council of State, Thomas Wilkes, launched an attack on the pretensions of the Regenten to sovereignty with a "Remonstrance" to the States of Holland, asserting that "by default of a legal prince" sovereignty belonged to the People, and not to Regenten who at best represented that People. Such an attack on their legitimacy could not be left unchallenged by the States, who commissioned Vranck to write a blistering reply, which he did in the form of his Deduction (with the very long name). This pamphlet took the form of a historical dissertation, going back 800 years to the mythical origins of the county of Holland and its political institutions, and "proving" that since time immemorial sovereignty had resided in the vroedschappen and nobility, and that it was administered by (not transferred to) the States, next to the Count of Holland (whose place had recently been declared vacant by the Act of Abjuration). In other words, in this view the republic already existed so it did not need to be brought into being. Vranck's conclusions reflected the view of the States at that time and would form the basis of the ideology of the States-Party faction in Dutch politics, in their defense against the "monarchical" views of their hard-line Calvinist and Orangist enemies in future decades. This dissertation was received with great enthusiasm by the States, who later had it entered in the Groot Placaetboeck (codex of Dutch laws). It formed the basis of constitutional expositions by Hugo Grotius (Liber de antiquitate reipublicae Batavicae; On the Antiquity of the Batavian Republic, 1610) and Simon van Slingelandt. The States were so enamored of Vranck that they offered him the post of deputy-Land's Advocate, under Van Oldenbarnevelt, but he had to decline, because the city of Gouda refused to let him go. However, two years later, in 1589, his contract as Pensionary was not renewed.

=== Career after 1589 ===
After his dismissal by Gouda Vranck again took up his law practice in The Hague. In 1590 he represented the cities of Gouda and Haarlem in an important lawsuit against the city of Rotterdam about a dam (the Hildam) in the Rotte river. In 1592 he was appointed a justice in the Hoge Raad van Holland en Zeeland (Supreme Court of the provinces of Holland and Zeeland). In this capacity Vrancke was sent as an intermediary by the States-General in 1597 to resolve a conflict between the city of Groningen and its Ommelanden. Meanwhile, he had declined an offer by the States of Utrecht to succeed Floris Thin as pensionary, and a similar offer of the city of Leiden.

In the period after 1592 relations between Vranck and Oldenbarnevelt cooled, as they were opposed on important policy questions. Vranck, together with Willem Usselincx, was very much in favor of giving the proposed Dutch West India Company (W.I.C.) in the years leading up to the Twelve Years' Truce a similar status as the Dutch East India Company, because he expected the new company to cause the Spanish Empire, with which the Republic was fighting the Eighty Years' War, much harm in its American possessions. As Oldenbarnevelt knew that for that reason a truce would become impossible if the plans for founding the company proceeded, he frustrated the plans of Vranck and Usselincx for the W.I.C. Later Vranck opposed the Erastian stance of Oldenbarnevelt and Grotius in the conflict with the Contra-Remonstrants, which he thought too extreme. He was no Contra-Remonstrant himself, though, as witnessed by his tolerant stance in religious matters expressed in the polemical Wederlegghinge (Refutation) that he wrote against a pamphlet by Franciscus Haraeus' Onpartijdighe verclaringhe der oorsaken des Nederlantsche oorlogs (1612) (Impartial explanation of the causes of the war in the Netherlands), in itself a reaction to the work of Grotius (which in turn was based on Vranck's own work).

== Works ==
- Franchois Vranck, (Deductie of) Corte vertooninge van het recht by den ridderschap, edelen ende steden van Holland ende West-Vrieslandt van allen ouden tyden in den voorschreven lande gebruyckt, tot behoudenisse vande vryheden, gerechtigheden, privilegien ende loffelicke gebruycken van den selven lande, 16 October 1587 (1587) (A Deduction or Short Exposition of the Rights Exercised by the Knights, Nobles, and Towns of Holland and West Friesland from Time Immemorial for the Maintenance of the Freedoms, Rights, Privileges and Laudable Customs of the Country)
- Franchois Vranck, Wederlegghinghe van een seker Boecxke uytghegheven bij Franchois Verhaer, ghenaemt onpartijdighe verclaringhe der oorsaken van de Nederlantsche Oorloghe, sedert den Jare 1566 tot ten Jare 1608 toe (posthumously; 1618)
