= Michiel ten Hove =

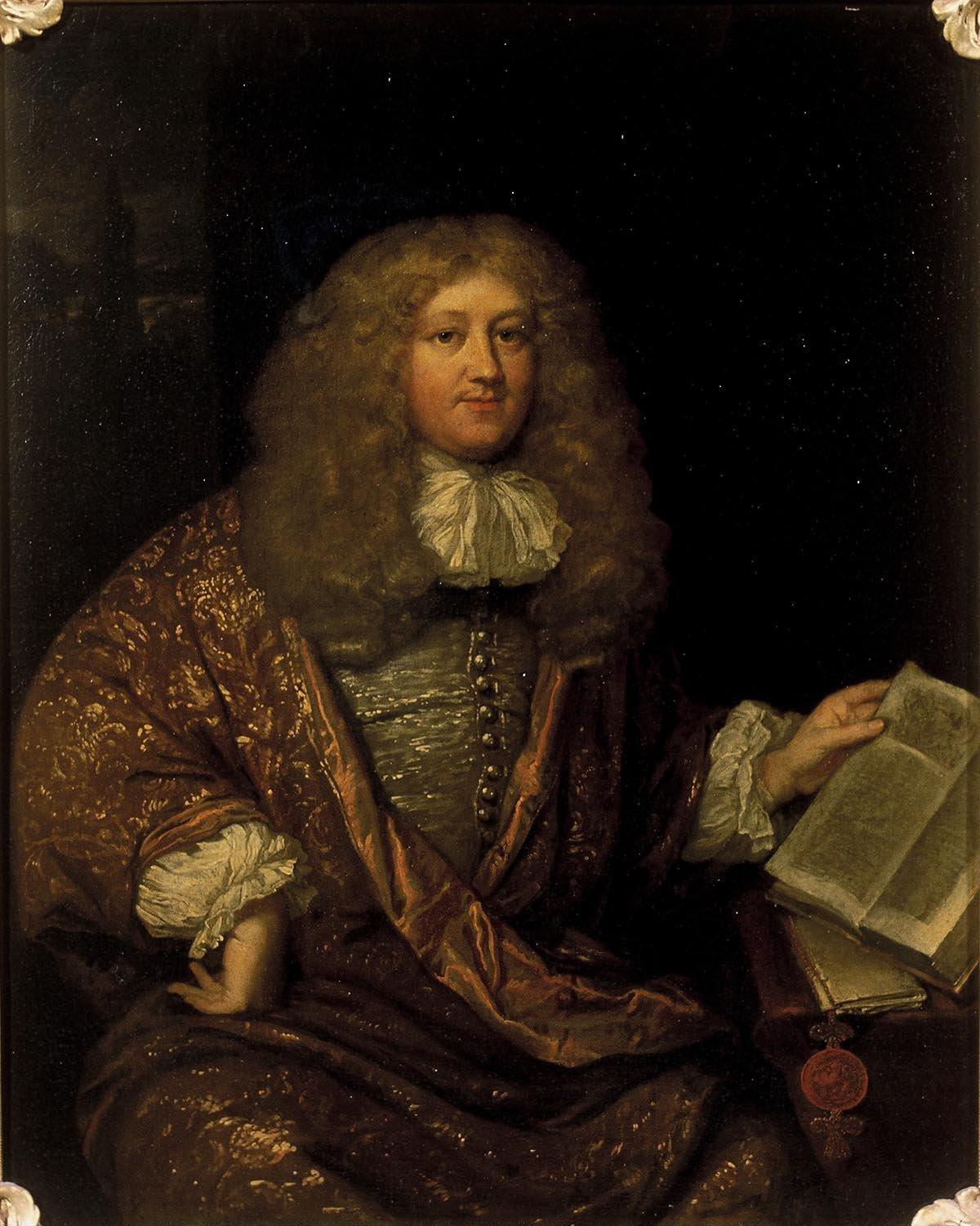
Michiel ten Hove

Michiel ten Hove (24 February 1640, The Hague – 24 March 1689, The Hague) was ad interim Grand Pensionary of Holland in 1688 and 1689.

== Life ==
He was a lawyer for the Dutch West Indies Company since 1664 and from 1672 pensionary of Haarlem. He was son of Nicolaas ten Hove and Cornelia Fagel, and nephew of Gaspar Fagel, who preceded him as Grand Pensionary and died in 1688. He was well appreciated by William III of Orange and probably would have succeeded his uncle formally, had he not died in office the next year.

== Sources ==
- Abraham Jacob van der Aa, Karel Johan Reinier van Harderwijk, Gilles Dionysius Jacobus Schotel (1876) Biographisch woordenboek der Nederlanden, J. J. van Brederode publishers, page 1354

Political offices
| Preceded by Gaspar Fagel | Grand Pensionary of Holland; 1688–1689 | Succeeded by Anthonie Heinsius |
