= Anthonie Heinsius =

Dutch statesman (1641–1720)

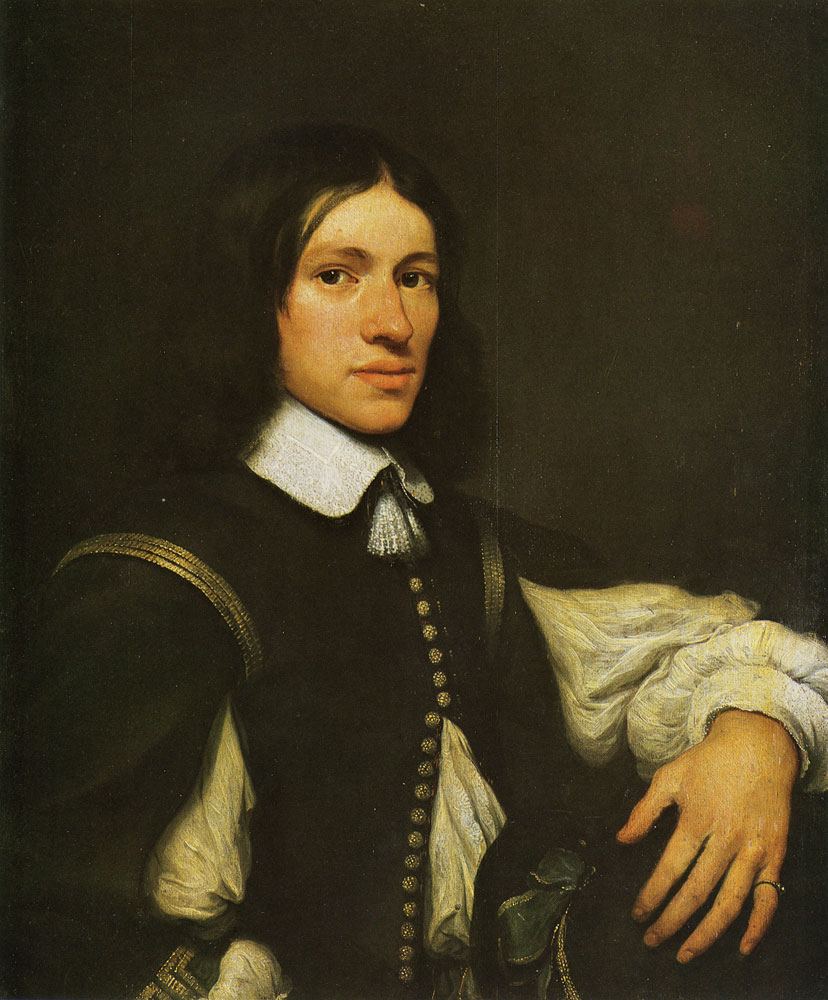
- 1659 portrait of Heinsius by Gerbrand van den Eeckhout

Grand Pensionary of Holland
- In office 26 May 1689 – 3 September 1720
- Preceded by: Michiel ten Hove
- Succeeded by: Isaac van Hoornbeek

Personal details
- Born: 23 November 1641 Delft, Dutch Republic
- Died: 3 September 1720 (aged 78) The Hague, Dutch Republic
- Party: States' Party
- Education: University of Orléans

Anthonie Heinsius (23 November 1641 – 3 August 1720) was a Dutch statesman who served as Grand Pensionary of Holland from 1689 to his death in 1720. Heinsius was an able negotiator and one of the greatest and most obstinate opponents of the expansionist policies of Louis XIV of France. He was one of the driving forces behind the anti-French coalitions of the Nine Years' War (1688–1697) and the War of the Spanish Succession (1701–1714).

Even during the life of King William III, he was seen as the preeminent statesman in Europe outside of France. After the death of William III in 1702, Heinsius' hold on the Dutch States General diminished, but he remained Grand Pensionary of Holland, and replaced William as the main policy maker in the field of foreign affairs of the Dutch Republic. In this he was supported by a Cabinet noir under the direction of his private secretary Abel Tassin d'Alonne.

== Early life ==
Anthonie Heinsius was born in Delft on 23 November 1641, from the marriage of Adriaan Heinsius and Maria Dedel. His father belonged to the governing families of Delft, where Anthonie completed his education at the Latin school. He later attended the University of Orléans, earning a doctorate in both civil and canon law in 1662. Upon returning to Delft, he practiced law there until his appointment as the city's pensionary in 1679.

In the States of Holland, during these years, the Delft government generally aligned with Amsterdam in opposition to the foreign policy of William III of Orange. Heinsius, as the city's pensionary, leaned in this direction, prompting some to see his assignment in 1682 to Paris as a means to remove him. His task was to address the acts of violence orchestrated by Louis XIV in the Principality of Orange. Before his departure, William III predicted a reception in Paris that would not be unfriendly but would yield no results, a prophecy that proved accurate. Heinsius resistance to the encroachments of Louis XIV, however, escalated to the extent that Louvois went as far as threatening him with imprisonment in the Bastille.

This mission seemingly contributed to convincing Heinsius that the power and politics of Louis XIV were indeed perilous and rightfully opposed by William III. In early 1685, he departed for England with several other delegates to negotiate difficulties between the Dutch (VOC) and English (EIC) East India Companies. In England he practiced his English, a language he understood, unlike his most of his compatriots. By the spring of 1686, the commission returned without achieving its goal, but in 1687 he became a member of the board of the Delft chamber of the Dutch East India Company. Correspondence between him and the Grand Pensionary Gaspar Fagel during this time clearly indicates that he no longer belonged to the adversaries of Prince William and the Grand Pensionary and Fagel came to trust him. Their relationship had even improved to the extent that, as Fagel's health deteriorated, Heinsius was approached regarding his willingness to take over Fagel's position.

== Grand Pensionary ==
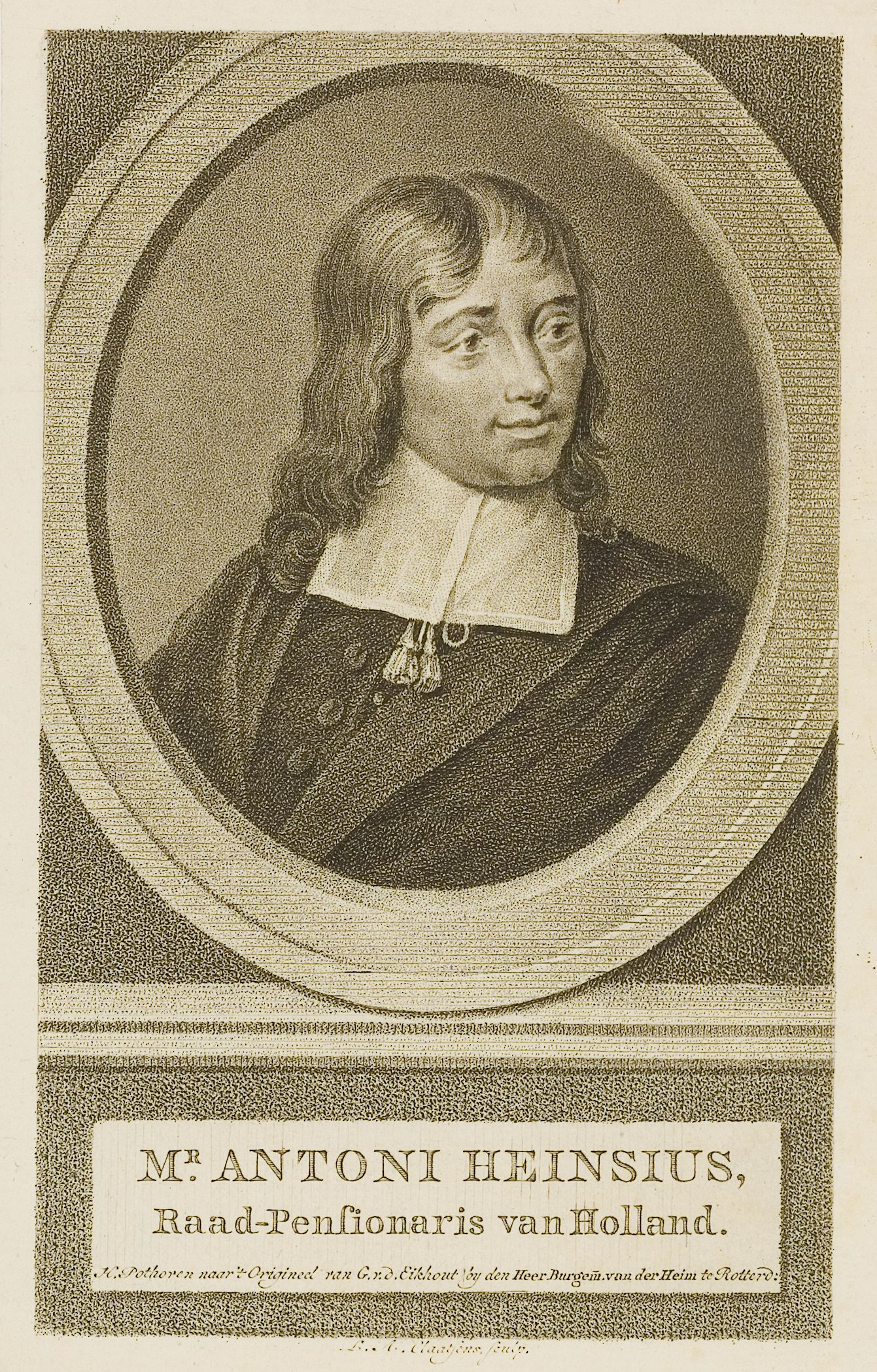

=== Nine Years' War ===
Upon Fagel's death at the end of 1688, the position of Grand Pensionary was temporarily assumed by Michiel ten Hove, the pensionary of Haarlem. However, Ten Hove died on 24 March 1689. Subsequently, Heinsius was entrusted with the interim performance of the office. Initially hesitant to accept an appointment, he yielded to the insistence of William, who, after the Glorious Revolution, now also was the King of England. On May 26, 1689, he was elected as the Grand Pensionary by the States of Holland and was subsequently reappointed every five years. During this time the Dutch Republic was involved in the Nine Years' War.

The Dutch had long been concerned with the fate of the Spanish Netherlands, viewing it as a strategic buffer against France. This perception endured even during periods of alliance with France, in the time of Johan de Witt. Evidenced by the popularity of the motto "Gallicus amicus non vicinus" ('France is a good friend, but not a good neighbour') within the Dutch Republic. The War of Devolution (1667–68) and the Franco-Dutch War (1672–78) showed the Spanish could not defend the Southern Netherlands. The Dutch hoped to create a barrier that would provide the strategic depth needed to protect their commercial and demographic heartlands around Amsterdam against attack from the south. The Ryswick peace negotiations which ended the Nine Years' War, allowed, among other things, the Dutch to place garrisons in eight Spanish key cities. Heinsius appeared among the Dutch delegates that concluded the peace.

=== Early years of the War of the Spanish Succession ===
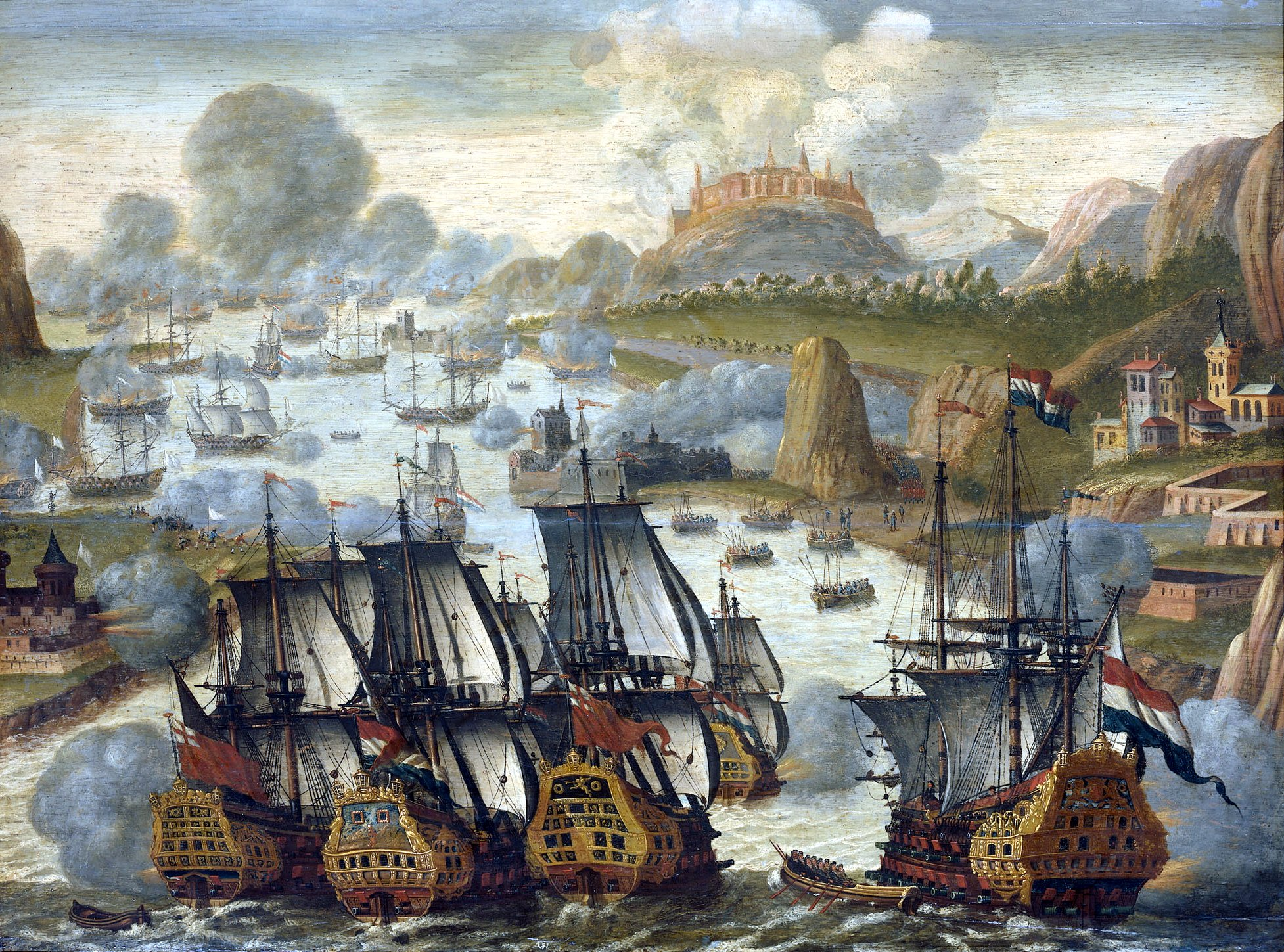
Dutch and English ships at the Battle of Vigo Bay, 1702

During the War of the Spanish Succession it is often argued that Heinsius, along with the Duke of Marlborough and Prince Eugene, formed the triumvirate that governed the Grand Alliance. Heinsius directed much of the political strategy of the Grand Alliance and, despite not being a military leader, had an important role in planning many military campaigns.

With the help of Maximilian of Bavaria, the governor of the Spanish Netherlands, the Dutch garrison troops had been replaced by French troops by 1701. Dutch priorities were to re-establish and strengthen the Barrier fortresses, retain control of the economically vital Scheldt estuary, and gain access to trade in the Spanish Empire. When Dutch forces operated outside the Spanish Netherlands this was often a concession to their English allies.

The first objective was, however, to secure the Dutch frontiers, threatened by the alliance between France, Bavaria, and Joseph Clemens of Bavaria, ruler of Liège and Cologne. In the early months Dutch Field Marshal, the Prince of Nassau-Usingen, captured Kaiserswerth, while an assault on Nijmegen, a very important Dutch city, was only barely repelled, by the Earl of Athlone.

Although Dutch Republic had many experienced generals, none of them were considered qualified enough for supreme command in the Low Countries. The Duke of Marlborough was instead appointed commander-in-chief of the joint Anglo-Dutch army. The trust William III had placed in him and the expectation that the appointment would ensure close cooperation between London and The Hague were the deciding factors.

However, Marlborough was considered an unknown quantity among the Dutch. He had never before commanded a large army and comparatively limited military experience. Moreover, he was a foreigner and the States General wanted to prevent English political and military interests from being prioritised over those of the Dutch. The States General thus put severe limits on his power, which were defined in 12 articles. The most notable articles stated that:

1. (Article 2) Marlborough was only allowed to command the Dutch troops that were part of the combined field army.
2. (Article 3) Marlborough always had to formulate his operational plans in consultation with the highest Dutch general, (Note: Athlone until 1703, Overkirk from 1704 to 1708 and Tilly from 1708.) who was also authorised to ask his subordinates for advice.
3. (Article 4) Marlborough had to take all his decisions in agreement with the Dutch commander and the field deputies.
4. (Article 6) Marlborough was not allowed to give orders to the Dutch troops independently of the Dutch senior officers.

Marlborough had to rely on his powers of tact and persuasion, and gain the consent of accompanying Dutch field deputies, the political representatives of the States General. Because of this Marlborough's good relationship with Heinsius would prove immensely beneficial to him.

The rest of the 1702 campaign went relatively well and Marlborough's army took Venlo, Roermond, Stevensweert and Captured Liège along the Meuse. The 1703 campaign was, instead, marred by Allied conflicts over strategy. Despite capturing Bonn, they failed to take Antwerp, while a Dutch contingent narrowly escaped disaster at Ekeren in June. In that same year, the strategic position of the Emperor continued to worsen. To relieve the pressure, Marlborough marched up the Rhine, joined forces with Louis of Baden and Prince Eugene, and crossed the Danube on 2 July. The Allied victory at Blenheim on 13 August forced Bavaria out of the war and the Treaty of Ilbersheim placed it under Austrian rule. Allied efforts to exploit their victory in 1705 foundered on poor co-ordination, tactical disputes and command rivalries. A diplomatic crisis between the Dutch Republic and England was only averted by the dismissal of General Slangenburg. Heinsius played a significant role in this.

=== Years of Success ===
In 1706, when the French court made some secret peace proposals, the advice of the Grand Pensionary and the government of Amsterdam was sought. The dutch-born French diplomat Adrianus Engelhard Helvetius, the son of the renowned physician, arrived from Paris under the pretext of visiting his father. While here, he engaged in several discussions with Heinsius on this subject, delivering letters and messages from President Rouillé. Furthermore, he sent a draft, approved by the Amsterdam government, to English statesmen. Heinsius then elaborated on the points, totaling 40, contained in this proposal. However, these negotiations did not result in peace. Heinsius received a letter from the French statesmen filled with bitter complaints about the conduct of the delegates involved in those negotiations.

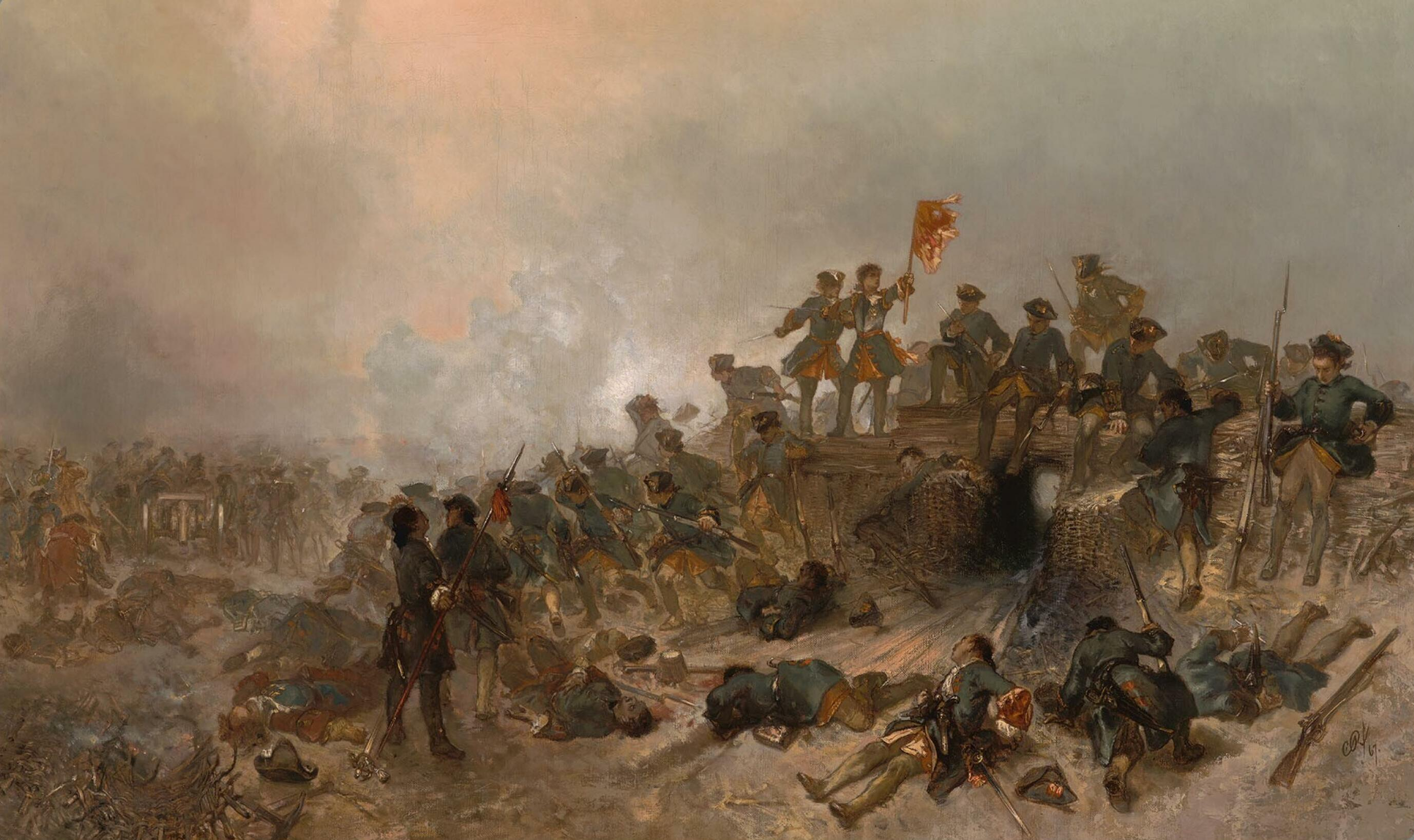
Dutch troops at the Battle of Malplaquet

From 1706, the war in the Spanish Netherlands took an unexpectedly favorable turn for the Allied army. At the Battle of Ramillies, a French army was decisively defeated, leading to a substantial portion of the Spanish Netherlands falling into the hands of the Anglo-Dutch forces. From July 1706 until Februari 1716, the Spanish Netherlands transitioned into an Anglo-Dutch condominium. The sovereignty of Charles was theoretically recognized, yet governance would be administered by a Council of State comprising Belgians, acting on his behalf under the regency of the Maritime Powers. The immediate threat to the Republic had diminished, sparking hope in Paris and anxiety in London and Vienna that Heinsius might seek a separate peace. However, it was overlooked that most strong fortified cities - like Tournai, Lille, Mons and Namur - were still not under Allied control. If they were to become part of the Dutch barrier, the war had to continue.

In the following years, the Allies slowly advanced towards and beyond the borders of France. Victories in the battles of Oudenarde and Malplaquet and the capture of Lille, Tournai, and Mons were notable successes for the Allies. Despite the soaring costs, which also greatly burdened the Republic, the imminent humiliation of France seemed undeniable. During the peace negotiations in 1709 and 1710, Louis appeared willing to make significant concessions.

However, the demands posed by the Allies to Louis XIV proved to be a step too far for him. Heinsius insisted that the king should deploy his own troops to expel his grandson from Spain. According to Heinsius and the other Dutch negotiators, this demand was necessary due to the French king's unreliability in the past. Louis had shown little respect for international treaties in the past when they were not in his favour. Heinsius feared that the Allies would still have to make great efforts to win the war in Spain and that France, after a pause in which it could recover, would restart the war. If the Allied troops had been moved to Spain to secure victory there, they would no longer be present in the Southern Netherlands, leaving the region open to the French armies. The peace negotiations of 1709 and 1710 thus collapsed.

=== Later life and death ===
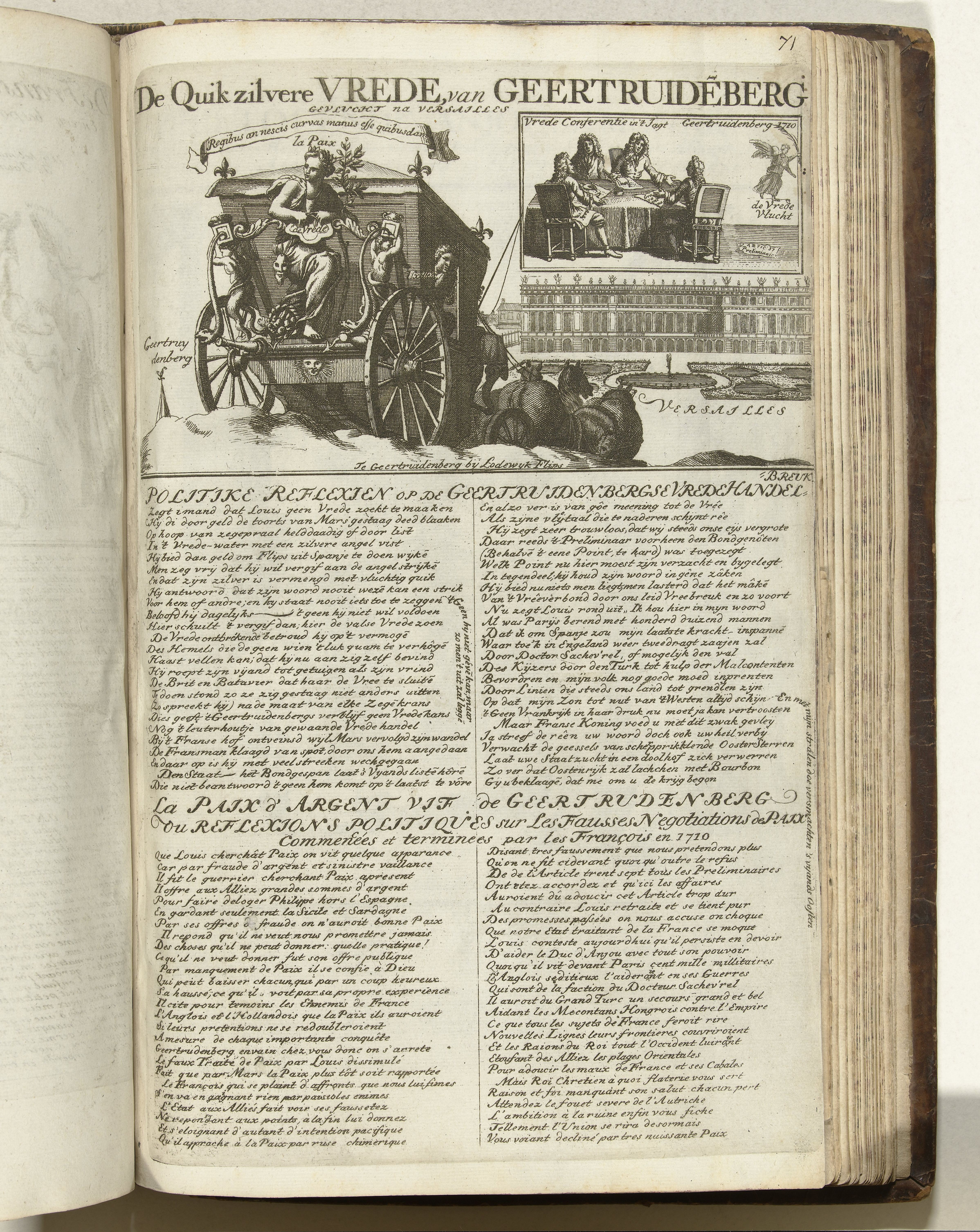
Allegory on the failure of the peace negotiations at Geertruidenberg, 1710. The Quicksilver Peace, fled from Geertruidenberg to Versailles.

In the 1710 British general election, the Whigs suffered a major electoral defeat. Allied defeats in Spain, high corn prices from poor harvests and heavy land taxes had fuelled public dissatisfaction in Britain against the Godolphin–Marlborough ministry. In response, Queen Anne dismissed the Whig Junto, including Marlborough, and in their place a Tory ministry led by Robert Harley came to power. The Harley ministry, who distrusted the Dutch and were opposed to the Whig policy of "No Peace without Spain", began secret negotiations with France, indicating they would acknowledge Philip V as king of Spain. This approach solidified after the death of Joseph I, Holy Roman Emperor in 1711, as the Tories perceived Charles VI unifying Habsburg territories in Austria and Spain to be an unappealing alternative.

Secret negotiations between British and French officials in 1711 quickly led to concrete terms. France and Bourbon Spain acknowledged British control over Gibraltar and Menorca along with the granting of the Asiento de Negros and other mercantile privileges to Britain, leading to the preliminaries of peace being signed in London on 8 October. The Dutch and Austrians, who were dismayed by Marlborough's dismissal and outraged by the Harley ministry's negotiation with France, decided to continue fighting against the French on their own. Heinsius and the Dutch regenten, despite losing a powerful ally, were all resolved to continue the war, which led to the overstraining of Dutch military resources. The Dutch assumed full control over foreign auxiliaries (such as the Danish Auxiliary Corps) who were previously also paid by the British and along with the Austrians organised themselves for further military operations, with Eugene being given overall command of the combined Dutch-Imperial army.

However, after the Dutch suffered a serious defeat at the battle of Denain, which compounded their collapsing economic situation, Heinsius and other senior Dutch officials felt compelled to come to terms with France, signing a new Barrier Treaty on 30 January 1713. These events, including being repeatedly reproached by other Dutch officials in 1712, severely shook Heinsius' authority and self-esteem, and rumours abounded that he intended to resign. Despite contemporary Dutch disillusionment regarding the war and the Peace of Utrecht, it fulfilled in many respects, both militarily and politically, what William III and Heinsius had envisaged for the war. French expansionism regarding the Low Countries had been stopped and the Dutch buffer realised. Hence, historians have noted that the disillusionment prevailing among Dutch contemporaries didn't arise from unmet aspirations of the Grand Alliances. Instead, it emerged from the unforeseen course this conflict undertook starting from 1706. Suddenly, the prospect of decisively overcoming Louis XIV appeared attainable. Nonetheless, the dire circumstances faced by France were not taken advantage of due to the Harley ministry's decision to pull out of the war.

Negotiations between Dutch and Austrian officials on the implementation of the Barrier Treaty dragged on until 1715, as the Austrians were reluctant to pay for Dutch garrisons stationed on their territory. George I's accession to the British throne on 1 August 1714 and the dismissal of the Tory ministry, sparked great joy in the Dutch Republic. Sicco van Goslinga, one of the most important Dutch statesman and a good friend of Heinsius, wrote the Grand Pensionary about this:

I know how greatly, and with good reason, you feared the misfortune with which we were threatened. That was the subject of our last conversation and of our anxieties, and afterward I learned from my friend [Simon van Slingelandt] that the danger appeared to you so evident that it brought you to tears. Such zeal is worthy of you; you are wholly devoted to the fatherland! Therefore, Sir, from the bottom of my soul I congratulate you upon an event which, in saving the Republic, has restored to you your former tranquillity.

Heinsius hoped that George would quickly support the Dutch in their negotiations with the Austrians. This did not prove the case, but the Jacobite rising of 1715 in the next year forced the British, who requested Dutch troops, to back the Dutch Republic. As a result the ongoing negotiations were concluded to the satisfaction of the Dutch. In the autumn of 1716, the British Townshend ministry, contrary to prior assurances, established an alliance with France without involving the Dutch in the negotiations, greatly disappointing Heinsius, as the Dutch had previously served as mediators in Anglo-French negotiations. After the Dutch joined this Anglo-French alliance, Heinsius was apprehensive in negotiations to transform it into a Quadruple Alliance by having Austria join, though this did not prevent the alliance from being established. Unmarried until the end of his life, Heinsius died on 3 September 1720 in the Hague while still in office.

== Legacy ==
=== Assessment ===
Heinsius and Marlborough together filled King William's place, with less authority, but far greater success.

— Winston Churchill

Heinsius held the post of Grand Pensionary for over 31 years, longer than most of his predecessors and successors, except for Johan van Oldenbarnevelt. Throughout these 3 decades he played a significant and respected role, although to a lesser extent after 1713 than before. The death of William III in 1702 marks a division in the years 1689–1713. William and Heinsius were closely aligned in their views on European affairs, often finding agreement. Heinsius actively shared his own detailed opinions, and William frequently sought his input. This collaboration with the Stadtholder-King greatly bolstered Heinsius' influence in Holland and the Republic, providing strong moral support.

After William's death, during the War of the Spanish Succession Heinsius, together with the Duke of Marlborough and Prince Eugene, essentially created and implemented the Grand Alliance's military and political policies. The American historian Darryl Dee writes that "for most of the War of the Spanish Succession, Heinsius' modest office on the ground floor of the Binnenhof in The Hague, where the triumvirs met between campaigns, was the true headquarters of the Grand Alliance." The French historian Clément Oury adds that Heinsius

was also a tireless worker who lived for and through his office: almost devoid of friends, with neither family nor interest in romantic relationships, his only real distraction was a marked taste for wine. [...] throughout the conflict, he remained an indispensable partner to the captain-general [Marlborough], who did not hesitate to describe him as a "great friend" and "a very judicious man." Heinsius understood perfectly the workings of Dutch administration and its multiple layers of decision-making. Marlborough relied on him to smooth over his often difficult relations with the Dutch military hierarchy and to provide the logistical support he needed. Heinsius did not hesitate to back him, even against his own countrymen.

Amidst Heinsius' widely acknowledged skills - keen intellect, sound judgment, extensive knowledge, tactfulness, great diplomatic finesse, tireless diligence, and unblemished integrity - lay a characteristic that sometimes hindered him: his humility. His modesty occasionally undercut his confidence, particularly after William's passing, fostering extreme caution and indecision.

=== Contemporary opinions ===
Jean Baptiste Colbert, Marquis of Torcy, a French diplomat, who negotiated some of the most important treaties towards the end of Louis XIV's reign, describes Heinsius as

a consummate man in affairs, of a reserved manner, polite in conversation, never harsh and seldom heated in debate. His demeanor, was accommodating; no ostentation in his household; his staff comprised a secretary, a coachman, a footman, a maid, not indicating the power of a prime minister.

he was not accused of finding pleasure in the consideration brought by the continuation of war to prolong it, nor of any personal interest.

The mysterious anonymous Monsieur de B., who served in the Dutch army and in the guards of William III, was famous for his shrewd observations on Dutch politicians and military officers. He described Heinsius in his memoires as a man who possessed:

all the talents one could desire in a minister: a pleasing and engaging appearance, great gentleness, patience, and discretion. At the same time, he could be as proud and inflexible as any man when circumstances required it, while at other moments he was accommodating and yielding. He possessed a coolness and brevity that silenced even the greatest talkers. [...] Because his government was sincere and he sought nothing except the good of the country, none of those satirical pamphlets or mocking writings, which in this country circulated with such impunity, appeared against him.

Voltaire presents Heinsius in his The Age of Louis XIV as a "Spartan proud to have humbled a Persian King," after the collapsed peace negotiations of 1709, when Louis XIV had sent Torcy to The Hague to seek peace.

== Sources ==
- Blok, P.J.; Molhuysen, P.C. (1911). "Heinsius, Antonie". Nieuw Nederlandsch biografisch woordenboek. Deel 1.
- Veendendaal, A.J. (1970). Bromley, J.S. (ed.). The New Cambridge Modern History: Volume 6, The war of the Spanish succession in Europe. Cambridge University Press. ISBN 978-0-521-29396-9.
- Van der Aa, A.J. (1867). "Anthonij Heinsius". Biographisch woordenboek der Nederlanden. Deel 8. Eerste stuk.
- Dee, Darryl (2024). 1709: The Twilight of the Sun King. Rowman & Littlefield. ISBN 978-1-5381-7667-2.
- Jongste, J. A. F. de; Veenendaal, A. J. (2002). Anthonie Heinsius and the Dutch Republic 1688-1720: politics, war. Institute of Netherlands History.
- Krämer, F.J.L. (1898). "Mémoires de monsieur de B.... ou anecdotes, tant de la cour du prince d'Orange Guillaume III, que des principaux seigneurs de la république de ce temps". Bijdragen en Mededeelingen van het Historisch Genootschap. 19.
- Lesaffer, Randall. "Fortress Belgium – The 1715 Barrier Treaty". OUP Law.
- Rowen, Herbert H. (1954). "John de Witt and the Triple Alliance". The Journal of Modern History. 26 (1): 1–14. doi:10.1086/237659. JSTOR 44224692. S2CID 145695238.
- Van Alphen, Marc; Hoffenaar, Jan; Lemmers, Alan; Van der Spek, Christiaan (2021). Military Power And The Dutch Republic: War, Trade and the Balance of Power in Europe, 1648–1813. Boom. ISBN 978-9087283650.
- Van Nimwegen, Olaf (2002). De Republiek der Verenigde Nederlanden als grote mogendheid: Buitenlandse politiek en oorlogvoering in de eerste helft van de achttiende eeuw en in het bijzonder tijdens de Oostenrijkse Successieoorlog (1740–1748) (in Dutch). De Bataafsche Leeuw. ISBN 9789067075404.
- Churchill, Winston (1936). Marlborough: His Life and Times. George G. Harrap Co. Ltd London.
- Van Nimwegen, Olaf (2020). De Veertigjarige Oorlog 1672-1712: de strijd van de Nederlanders tegen de Zonnekoning (The 40 Years War 1672-1712: the Dutch struggle against the Sun King) (in Dutch). Prometheus. ISBN 978-90-446-3871-4.
- Ostwald, Jamel (2000). ""The 'Decisive' Battle of Ramillies, 1706: Prerequisites for Decisiveness in Early Modern Warfare."". The Journal of Military History. 42 (3): 649–677. JSTOR 44224692.
- Oury, Clément (2022). Le Duc de Marlborough: John Churchill, le plus redoutable ennemi de Louis XIV [The Duke of Marlborough: John Churchill, Louis XIV's Most Formidable Enemy] (in French). Perrin. ISBN 978-2262086145.
- Wijn, J.W. (1956). Het Staatsche Leger: Deel VIII Het tijdperk van de Spaanse Successieoorlog (The Dutch States Army: Part VIII The era of the War of the Spanish Succession) (in Dutch). Martinus Nijhoff.

Political offices
Preceded by Michiel ten Hove	Grand Pensionary of Holland; 1689–1720	Succeeded by Isaac van Hoornbeek
