= Anthonie van der Heim =

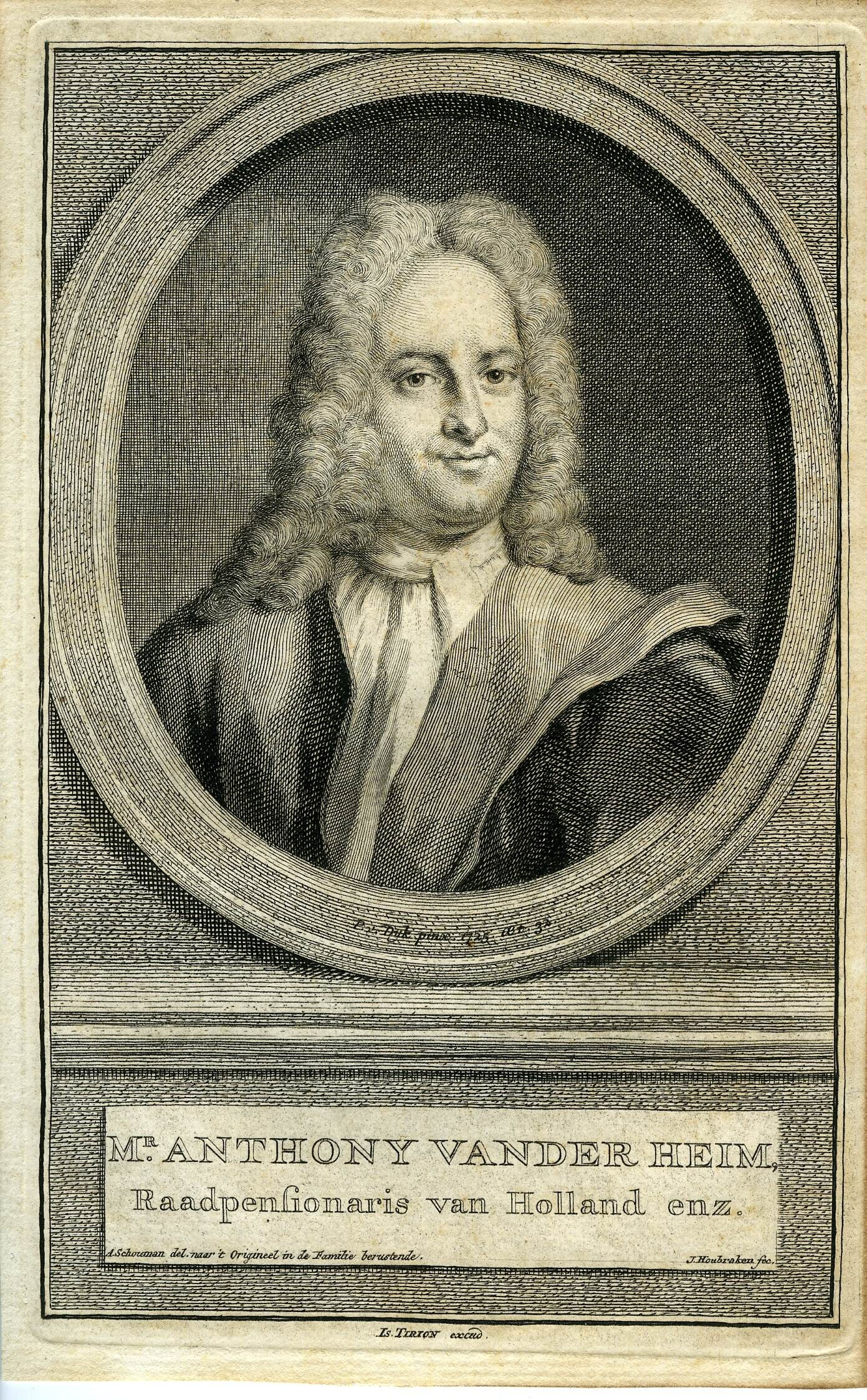
Anthonie van der Heim

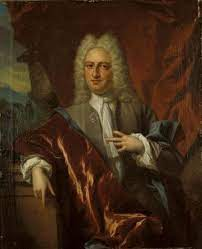

Anthonie van der Heim (28 November 1693, in The Hague – 17 July 1746, in 's-Hertogenbosch) was Grand Pensionary of Holland from 4 April 1737 to 17 July 1746.

== Biography ==
Van der Heim was the son of Anthonie Gerritsz van der Heim, councillor in the Supreme Court, and Catharina Heinsius. His uncle was Grand Pensionary Anthonie Heinsius.

From 1709, he studied law in Leiden, where he obtained his doctorate in 1711. On 28 December of that year, he defended his dissertation Disputatio juridica inauguralis ad Leg. 18C de transactionibus.

In 1710, Van der Heim began his career as secretary of the Generaliteitsrekenkamer (Financial audit institution). In this position, his talent for finance became apparent. In 1727, he succeeded Simon van Slingelandt, who had been appointed Grand Pensionary of Holland, as Treasurer-General of the Union.

After Van Slingelandt's death in 1736, Van der Heim and a number of others came into the picture for the office of Grand Pensionary. However, the pensioners of Haarlem and Dordrecht, Visscher (described as pro-English by the French ambassador de Fénelon) and Teresteijn van Halewijn (no support in his own city) dropped out. After much insistence, the 'neutral' Van der Heim agreed, on condition that his instructions would be adjusted. He felt too restricted by the new instructions presented to him. Van der Heim proposed new texts, which were largely adopted. Eventually, both parties came to an agreement with a compromise text and Van der Heim accepted the position.

An important issue during the term of office of Grand Pensionary Van der Heim was the inability of the Regents to reform the state finances and reduce fraud in tax collection. The introduction of a very progressive income tax in Holland in 1742 during Van der Heim's term of office, namely the Personeele Quotisatie, and unique in Europe, was supposed to provide financial relief. The model for this tax was the Familiegelt from 1715. However, the Personeele Quotisatie did not bring the desired result. As a result of the disappointing yields and resistance, this tax was abolished again in 1749.

Since his instructions forbade him to change anything in the State system (he was not allowed to make any effort to restore the Stadtholdership), he did nothing to help Prince William IV of Orange-Nassau in his attempts to be appointed General in the States army, as such a promotion was seen as a first step towards the Stadtholdership.

Van der Heim has been described differently by contemporaries. By some as an indecisive and not very powerful figure, but for others he was 'the linchpin, so to speak, on which everything turned' and 'the helmsman of the ship of state'. The pressure under which Van der Heim lived as a result of the great opposing forces within the Republic and also the political pressure exerted on him by France and England, which only increased as the War of the Austrian Succession progressed, gradually began to undermine his health.
Early in 1746 his heart complaints became increasingly serious. Van der Heim received permission from the States of Holland to go to Spa for a cure. Willem Buys would replace him during his absence. However, he had already suffered a heart attack that day and died completely exhausted in 's-Hertogenbosch, on his way to Spa, aged 52.

=== Marriage and children ===
On 25 May 1721, Van der Heim had married Catharina van der Waeyen, daughter of the Frisian deputy in the States-General, Jacob van der Waeyen and Herbertina de Witt. His only son was Jacob van der Heim (1727-1799), Mayor of Rotterdam and secretary of the Admiralty of Rotterdam during the Patriot period.

== Sources ==
- Nieuw Nederlandsch Biografisch Woordenboek (NNBW) (in Dutch).
- Biographisch woordenboek der Nederlanden. Deel 8. Eerste stuk(1867)–A.J. van der Aa– (in Dutch).
- Tussen macht en onmacht. Een politieke biografie van Anthonie van der Heim (1693-1746). Doctoral Thesis by Dral, W.J. (2016) (in Dutch).

Political offices
Preceded by Simon van Slingelandt	Treasurer-General of the United Provinces; 1727–1737	Succeeded by Nicolaas ten Hove
Preceded by Simon van Slingelandt	Grand Pensionary of Holland; 1737–1746	Succeeded by Willem Buys
