= Pieter van Bleiswijk =

Dutch politician (1724–1790)

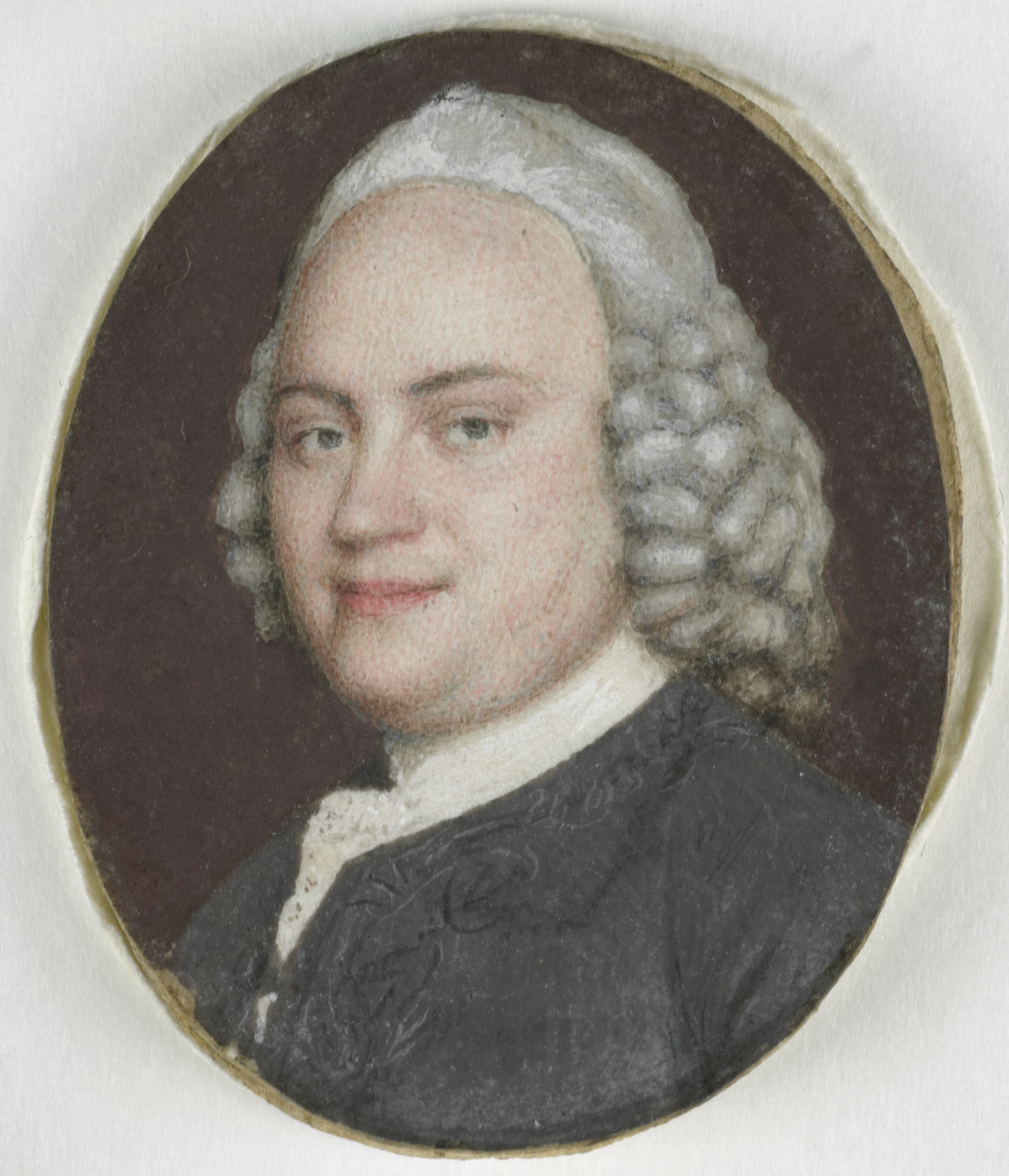
Portrait of Pieter van Bleiswijk (between 1750 and 1789)

Pieter van Bleiswijk (1724, Delft – 29 October 1790, The Hague) was grand pensionary of Holland from 1 December 1772 to November 1787. During the American Revolutionary War he was a sympathizer with the American insurgent cause and had dealings with American diplomats John Adams and Benjamin Franklin.

He was an opponent of Duke Louis Ernest of Brunswick-Lüneburg, the main adviser of Prince William V of Orange. He was deposed during the Prussian invasion of the United Provinces in 1787.

Political offices
| Preceded by Pieter Steyn | Grand Pensionary of Holland; 1772–1787 | Succeeded by Laurens Pieter van de Spiegel |
