= Franciscus Haraeus =

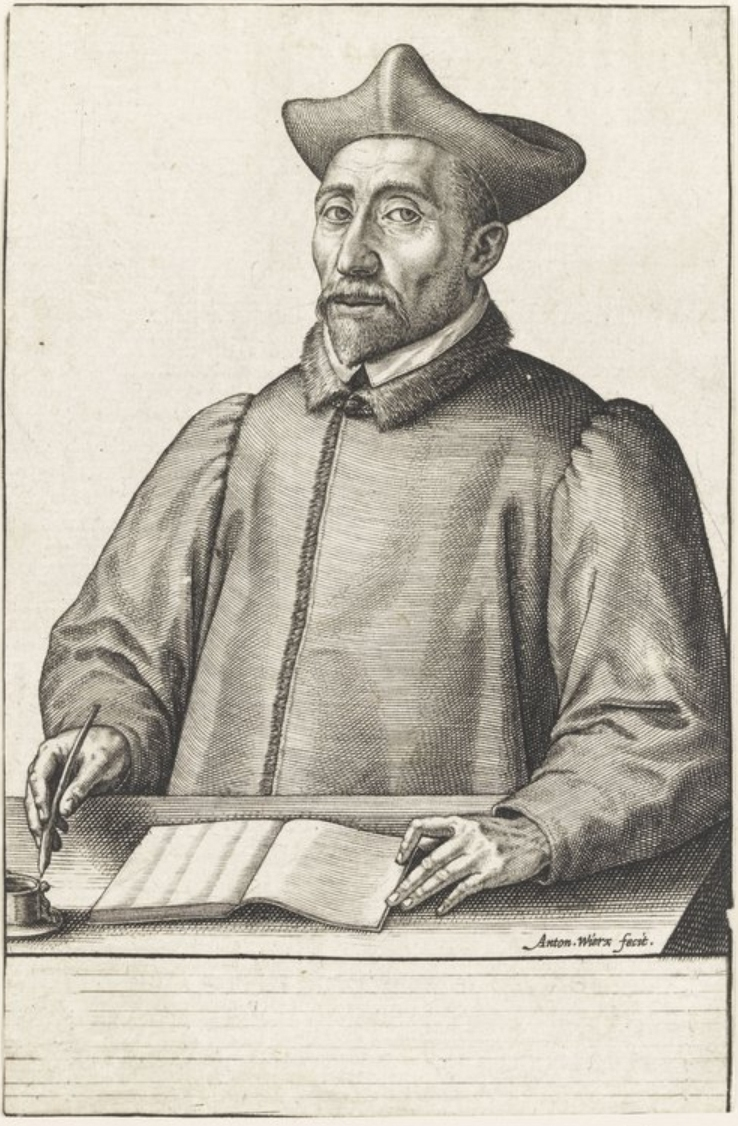
Portrait of Franciscus Harraeus, theologican, historian and cartographer.

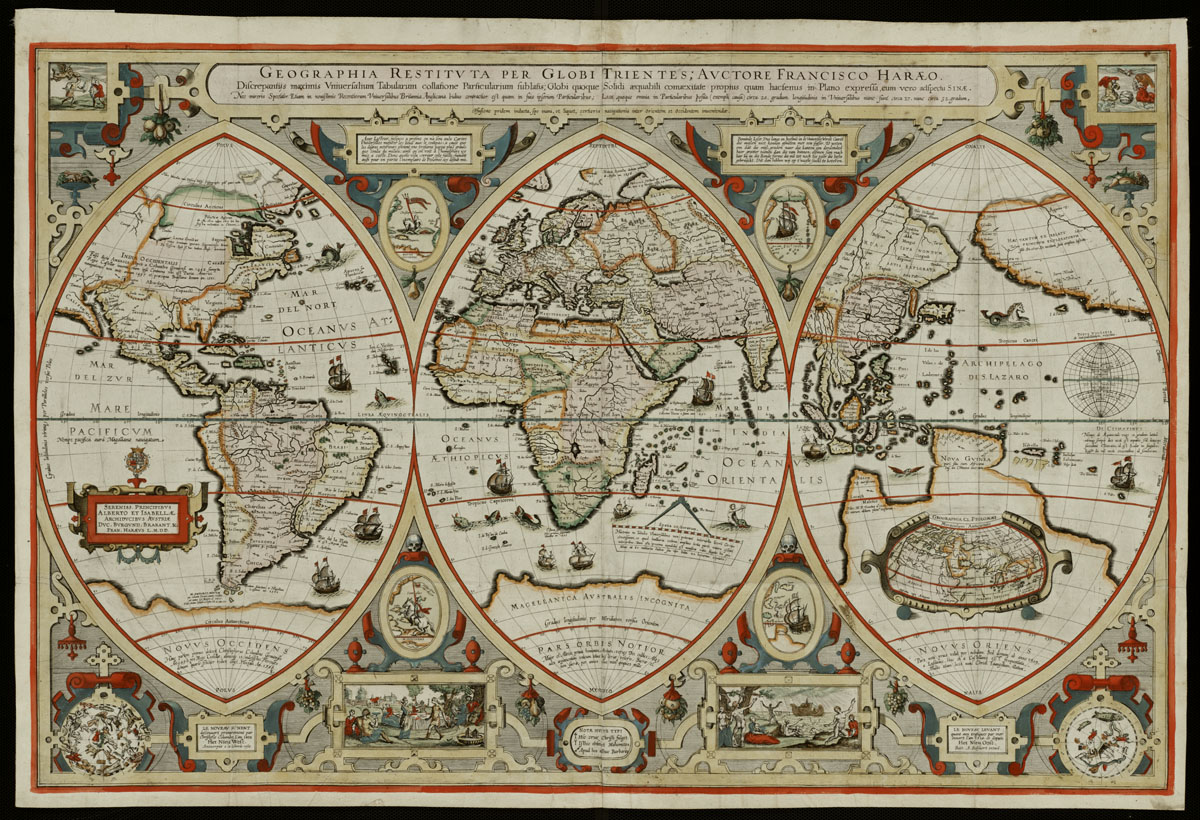
Geographica restituta per globi trientes (1618) by Franciscus Haraeus

Franciscus Haraeus (Latinised form of Franciscus Verhaer; also known as Frans Verhaer), (Utrecht 1555? - Leuven, 11 January 1631), was a theologian, historian, and cartographer from the Low Countries. He is best known for his history of the origins of the Dutch Revolt, written from a Catholic perspective but without polemical bias. He was one of the first cartographers to make thematic maps and globes.

== Life ==
Haraeus first attended the Latin school of the Brethren of the Common Life in Utrecht and subsequently studied theology at the University of Louvain under Thomas Stapleton and Joannes Molanus. He was ordained a Roman Catholic priest at an early age, probably in 1578. He was appointed as a professor of rhetoric at the recently established University of Douai where he also obtained a Licentiate of Theology. In 1581 he accompanied the papal legate Antonio Possevino on an embassy to John III of Sweden and Ivan the Terrible.

Back in the Dutch Republic he became a canon at St. John's Cathedral ('s-Hertogenbosch), later dean in Dunkirk and professor of theology at Tongerlo Abbey. In 1604-1609 he worked as a priest in Utrecht where he was in contact with Buchelius. After 1609 he moved permanently to the Spanish Netherlands where he became the rector of a nunnery in Antwerp, before becoming a canon in Namur in 1617, and after 1621 in Leuven. He died in the latter city on 11 January 1631, and was buried in the St. Peter Church in Leuven, near the tomb of Thomas Stapleton.

== Historical works ==
Haraeus compiled a large number of hagiographies. However, his historical works of longer lasting import concerned the first part of the Eighty Years' War through which he had lived himself. He clearly took the side of king Philip II of Spain against William the Silent, giving his work a clear bias. His first publication in this field was Onpartijdighe Verklaringhe der oorsaken der Nederlantsche oorloghs sedert 't jaer 1566 tot 1608 (Antwerp 1612). This provoked a critical response from the Dutch judge François Vranck. Meanwhile, Haraeus had already started on his major history: Annales ducum seu principum Brabantiae totiusque Belgii tomi tres: quorum primo solius Brabantiae, secundo Belgii uniti principum res gestae, tertio Belgici tumultus usque ad inductas anno MDCIX pactas, enarrantur (Antwerp 1623). This work was well received in the Spanish Netherlands where it was long a "best seller". The third volume was reworked by its author, but this version only exists in manuscript; it was never printed.

== Cartographic work ==
Haraeus was one of several clergymen from the Netherlands who around the turn of the 17th century made important contributions to the young science of map-making (another was Petrus Plancius). He was one of the three cartographers in the Spanish Netherlands who kept the craft of globe-making alive there after the exodus of many cartographers around the turn of the 17th century. In 1614 he published a six-gore map entitled Novus typus orbis ipsus globus, ex Analemmate Ptolomaei diductus This was one of the first instances of a thematic map as it showed the dispersion of Christianity and Islam at the time, using map symbols developed by Jodocus Hondius in his Designatio Orbis Christiani (1607)

In 1624 a map entitled Lumen Historiarum per Orientem was published by Balthasar Moretus as part of a new edition of Ortelius' Theatrum orbis terrarum Parergon which recognized Haraeus as its maker. This map was part of a set of two made earlier by Haraeus and designed as a comprehensive guide to sacred geography.

As a final example, Haraeus Geographica restituta per globi trientes (1618) shows the world in three globe-gores, with insets showing a map representing the 2nd-century worldview of Ptolemy at lower right, and a legend for the map in the lower center, explaining symbols which identify religious populations (a cross for Christian regions, a crescent for Islam, and a slanted arrow for barbarians).
