= Pieter Steyn =

Dutch government official

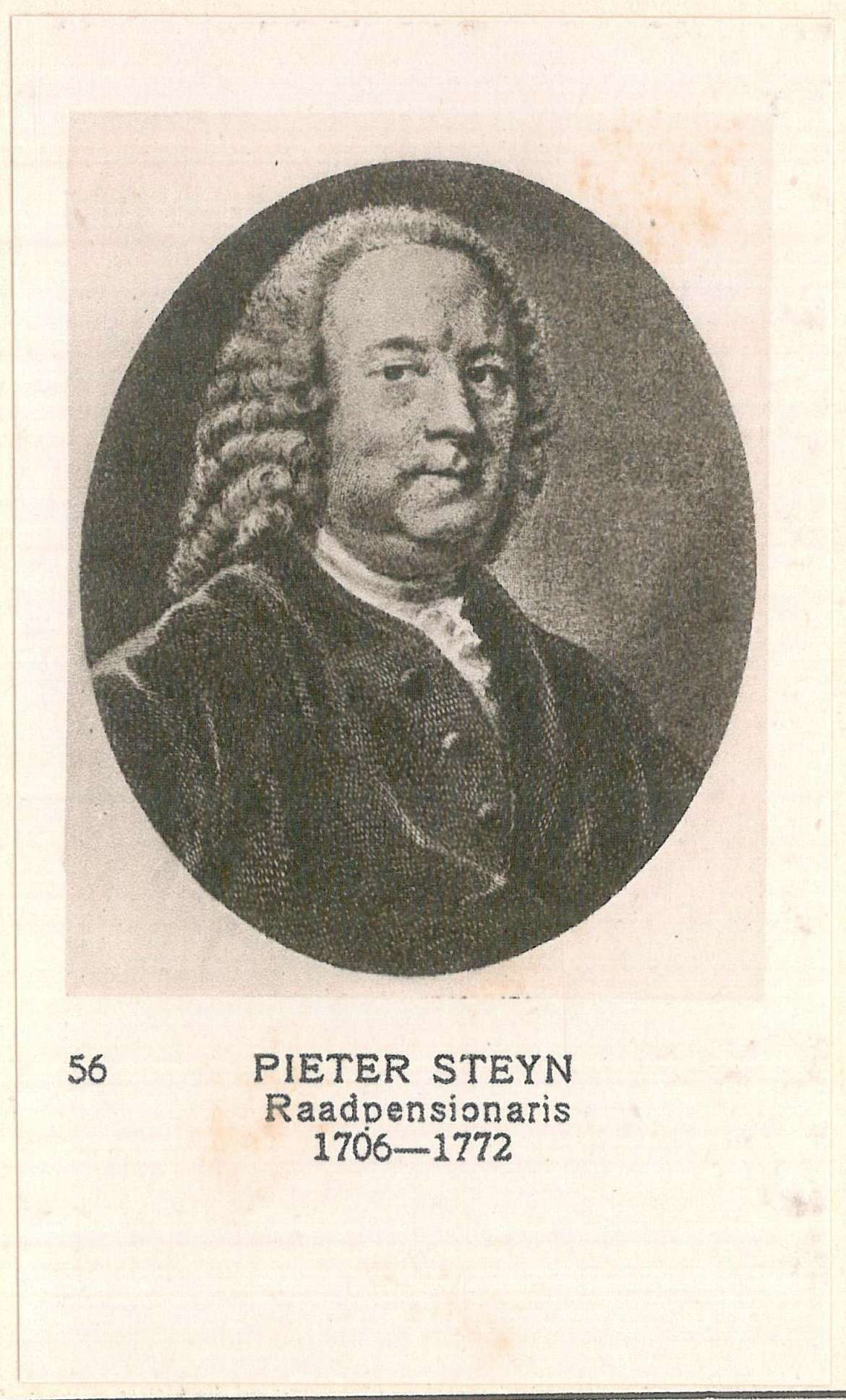
Pieter Steyn

Pieter Steyn (October 6, 1706 in Haarlem – November 5, 1772) was a Dutch government official. He was grand pensionary of Holland from June 18, 1749 to November 5, 1772. Over the course of his career, he also served as an alderman, mayor, councillor, and administrative officer.

He was the son of Johanna Patijn and Adriaan Steyn, mayor of Haarlem. He studied Latin with Eduard van Zurck, and went on to study law in Leiden between 1724 and 1726.

Both his marriages (of 1736 and 1740) were without issue.

As Grand Pensionary of Holland, Pieter Steyn was overshadowed by the Duke of Brunswick-Lüneburg, "governing guardian" of the minor stadtholder William V, Prince of Orange.

Political offices
| Preceded by Jacob Gilles | Grand Pensionary of Holland; 1749–1772 | Succeeded by Pieter van Bleiswijk |
