= Paulus Aertsz van Ravesteyn =

Dutch printer

Paulus Aertsz van Ravesteyn (c. 1586 – buried 3 November 1655, in Amsterdam) was a Dutch printer who worked for local publishers, individuals and also published books himself. At his May 19, 1608, marriage to Elisabeth Sweerts in Amsterdam he is said to be a 21-year old typesetter from Dordrecht. Possibly he originated from North Brabant where his family owned land. His first own publication dates from 1611.

== Publishing ==
A list of publishers van Ravesteyn worked for includes:

- Amelisz, Jan Utrecht, 1609-1631
- Banningh, Jan Amsterdam, 1619-1659
- Blaeu-laken, Cornelis Willemsz, Amsterdam, 1622-1644
- Brandt, Marten Jansz, Amsterdam, 1613-1649
- Cloppenburgh, Jan Evertsz (II), Amsterdam, 1598-1637
- Colijn, Manuel, Amsterdam, 1622–1632;
- Cool, Cornelis Dircksz (I), Amsterdam, 1614–1651, 1666
- Gerritsz, Hessel, Amsterdam, 1612-1630
- Hendricksz, Fijt, Amsterdam, 1627, 1629, 1633
- Heyns, Zacharias Zwolle, 1607-1629
- Huybrechtsz, Abraham, Amsterdam, 1611-1616
- Ilpendam, David Jansz van Leiden, 1617-1642
- Janssonius, Johannes, Amsterdam, 1608, 1613-1664
- Kempfer, Erasmus, Frankfurt am Main, 1612, 1614
- Kempner, Anthonius, Frankfurt am Main, 1612
- Kok, Dirrik Jelissen, Amsterdam, 1625
- Koning, Abraham de, Amsterdam, 1615-1618
- Koster, Herman Allertsz, Amsterdam, 1598–1616;
- Laurensz, Hendrick, Amsterdam, 1607-1648
- Meyer, Dirck, Amsterdam, 1628-1660
- Mostarde, Pierre, Amsterdam, 1618
- Neulighem, Anthonio van, Amsterdam, date unknown
- Paets, Pieter Jacobsz, Amsterdam, 1616-1657
- Pers, Dirck Pietersz, Amsterdam, 1607-1649
- Pharar, Abraham, Amsterdam, 1627
- Plasse, Cornelis Lodewijcksz van der, Amsterdam, 1613-1640
- Roelandus, Titus, Amsterdam, 1618
- Sweerts, Emanuel, Frankfurt am Main, 1612
- Verberg, Nicolaes Ellertsz, Amsterdam, 1618-1620
- Voscuyl, Dirck Pietersz, Amsterdam, 1610, 1614-1622
- Wachter, Jacob Pietersz, Amsterdam, 1613-1649
