= Jacob Gilles =

Grand Pensionary of Holland (?-1765)

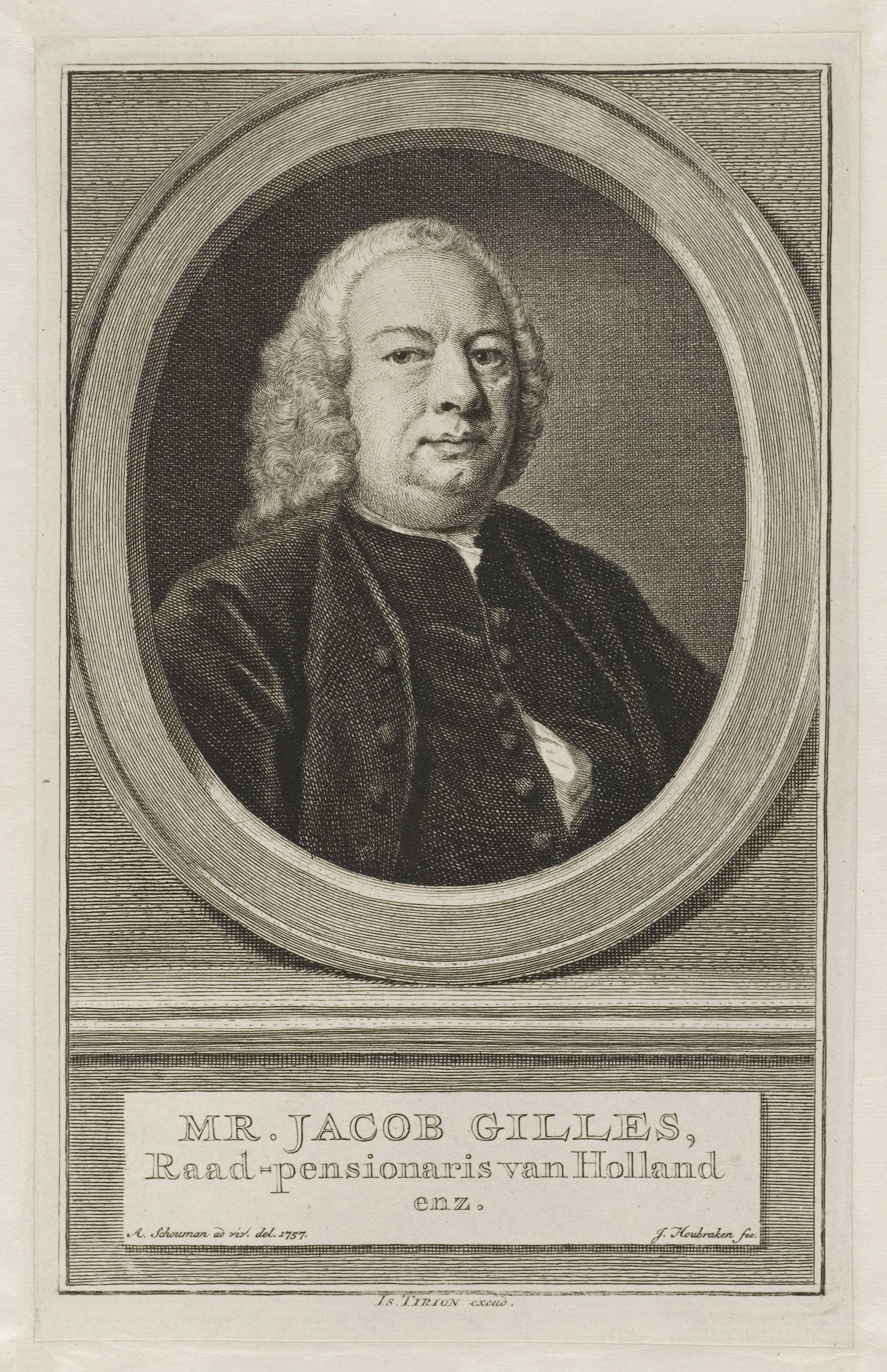
Jacob Gilles

Jacob Gilles (ca. 1691 or 1692 in Kollum – 10 September 1765 in Ypenburg manor near Rijswijk) was Grand Pensionary of Holland from 23 September 1746 to 18 June 1749.

== Biography ==
He was appointed Pensionary of Haarlem in 1731 and appointed second Registrar of the States General in 1744.
In 1746 he was assigned to Unico Wilhelm van Wassenaer as a co-negotiator with France, to avert an invasion of the United Provinces.
On September 23, 1746 he was appointed Grand Pensionary, the most important position in the country.
After the failure of negotiations with the French and the subsequent invasion, in a panic reaction and as a last resort, William IV of Orange-Nassau was appointed captain general, admiral general of the Republic and stadtholder of all regions on 2 May 1747 . This ended the Second Stadtholderless Period.

Jacob Gilles lost his power, was called a French henchman and a traitor and was threatened with the plundering of his possessions. After the end of the war, Jacob Gilles subsequently resigned as Grand Pensionary on 3 May 1749.

Preceded by Willem Buys	Grand Pensionary of Holland; 1746–1749	Succeeded by Pieter Steyn
