= Gaspar Fagel =

Dutch politician

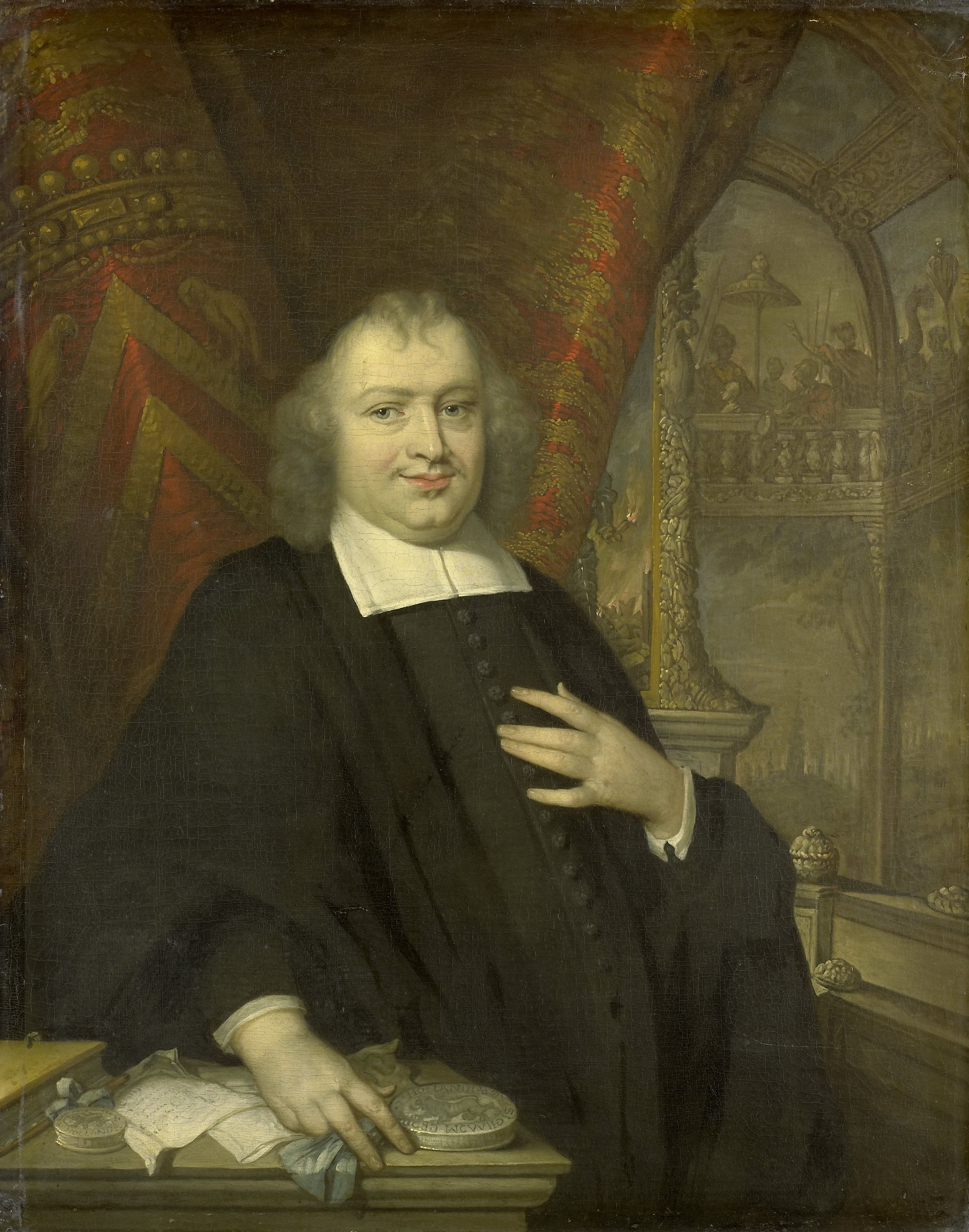
- Portrait by Johannes Vollevens

Grand Pensionary of Holland
- In office 20 August 1672 – 5 December 1688
- Preceded by: Johan de Witt
- Succeeded by: Michiel ten Hove

Personal details
- Born: 25 January 1634 The Hague, Dutch Republic
- Died: 15 December 1688 (aged 54) The Hague, Dutch Republic
- Resting place: Grote Kerk, The Hague

Gaspar Fagel (25 January 1634 – 15 December 1688) was a Dutch politician, jurist, and diplomat who authored correspondence from and on behalf of William III, Prince of Orange, during the English Revolution of 1688.

== Early life ==
Fagel was born into a distinguished patrician family. Little is known of his early life, but in 1663 he was elected Pensionary of Haarlem and as such was also a member representative of the States of Holland.

== Political career ==
In 1667, Fagel, Johan de Witt, Gillis Valckenier, and Andries de Graeff signed the Perpetual Edict, a resolution to abolish the office of Stadtholder in the County of Holland. At approximately the same time, a majority of provinces in the States-General agreed to declare the office of stadtholder incompatible with the office of captain general of the Dutch Republic.

In 1670, Fagel was made Secretary of the Staten-Generaal. After the resignation and subsequent murder of Johan and Cornelis de Witt in 1672, Fagel was elevated to the position of Grand Pensionary. He was distinguished for his integrity and the firmness with which he repelled the attempts of Louis XIV of France against his country, and for his zeal in supporting the claims of William III, Prince of Orange to the English throne.

== Correspondence ==
William used letters from Fagel to reassure English Nonconformists or dissenters that they would be allowed to practice their religion. Some of these were written as Pensionary of Holland, including an open letter written in 1687, deploring James' religious policy; others purported to be written at William's request.

In 1687, James Stewart, a Scottish Presbyterian lawyer who supported repeal of the Test Acts, had been in contact with a number of Dutch acquaintances. It was passed onto Fagel, who prepared a response.

In early 1688, this letter was widely circulated in England; it confirmed tolerance for dissenters but did not require them to support repeal. Many dissenters viewed the act as essential for guaranteeing the primacy of the Protestant faith, and Fagle confirmed the Dutch would support the softening of some laws only if "... those laws remain still in their full vigour by which the Roman Catholics are shut out of both Houses of Parliament and out of all public employment, ecclesiastical, civil and military, as likewise all those others which confirm the Protestant religion and which secure it against all the attempts of the Roman Catholic."

The effect of this letter, and others, was to assure the Parliament that William III would not stand in the way of the Parliament's legislative agenda which manifested itself in the form of the Bill of Rights of 1689.

Political offices
Preceded by Johan de Witt	Grand Pensionary of Holland; 1672–1688	Succeeded by Michiel ten Hove
