= Willem Buys =

Grand Pensionary of Holland

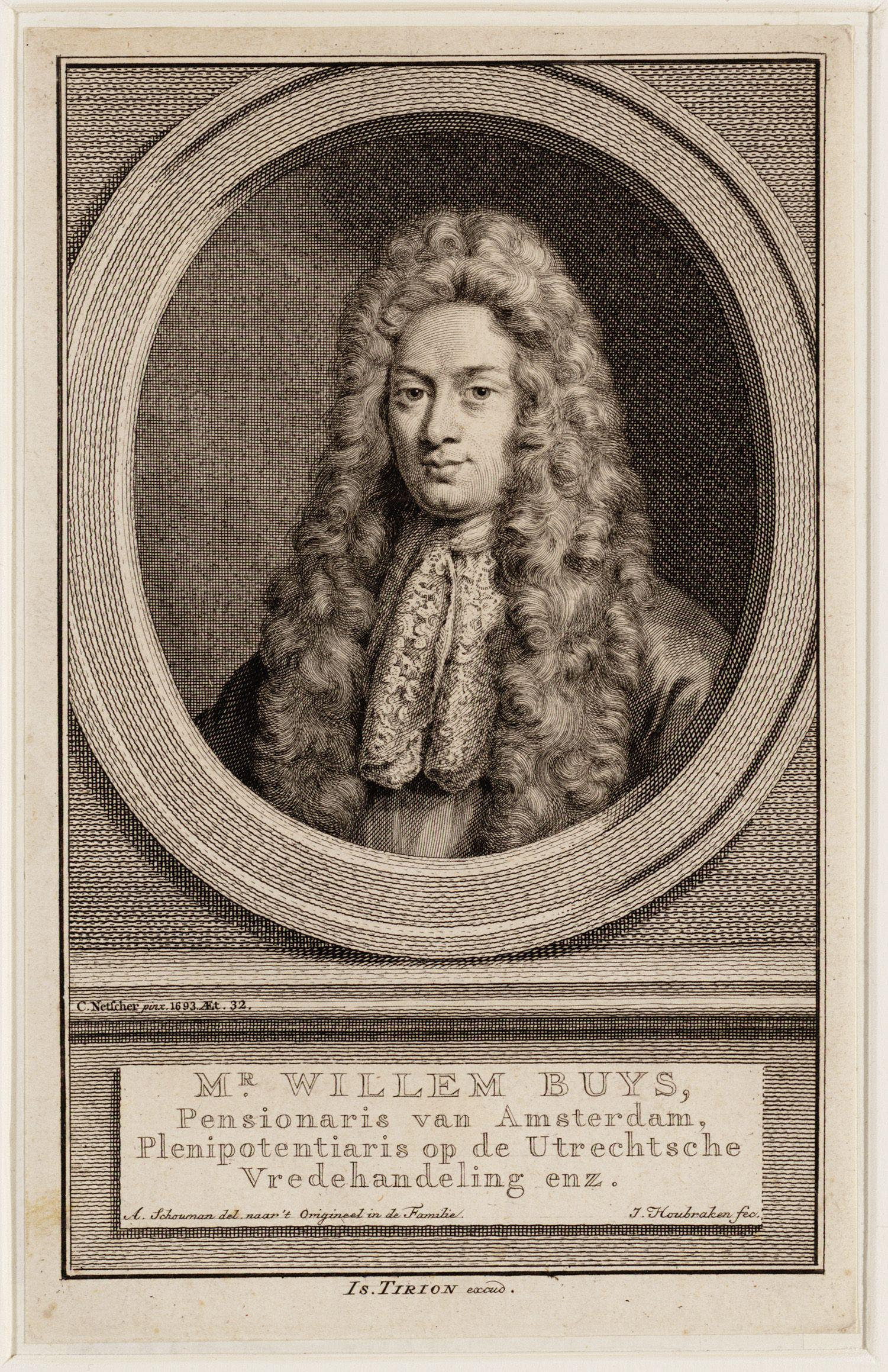
Willem Buys

Willem Buys (1661–1749) was acting Grand Pensionary of Holland in the summer of 1746. He was pensionary of Amsterdam (1693–1725) and first secretary of the estates of Holland (1726–1749). He was elected Fellow of the Royal Society in 1706.

He had successes as negotiator of the United Provinces. He improved the diplomatic relationship with England in 1705 and 1706 and he was one of the Dutch negotiators during the peace negotiations in 1710 in Geertruidenberg and 1713 in Utrecht.

When he was 85 years old, he served as acting Grand Pensionary of Holland for 3 months, after the death of Anthonie van der Heim.

Preceded by Anthonie van der Heim	Grand Pensionary of Holland; July–September 1746	Succeeded by Jacob Gilles
