= Isaac van Hoornbeek =

Grand Pensionary of Holland (1655–1727)

Isaac van Hoornbeek.

Isaäc van Hoornbeek (9 December 1655 – 17 June 1727) was Grand Pensionary of Holland, the political official of the entire Dutch Republic, from 12 September 1720 until his death in 1727.

Hoornbeek was born in Leiden. He served as pensionary of Rotterdam before 1720. He died, aged 71, in The Hague.

Political offices
Preceded by Anthonie Heinsius	Grand Pensionary of Holland; 1720–1727	Succeeded by Simon van Slingelandt
