= Simon van Slingelandt =

Dutch politician and diplomat

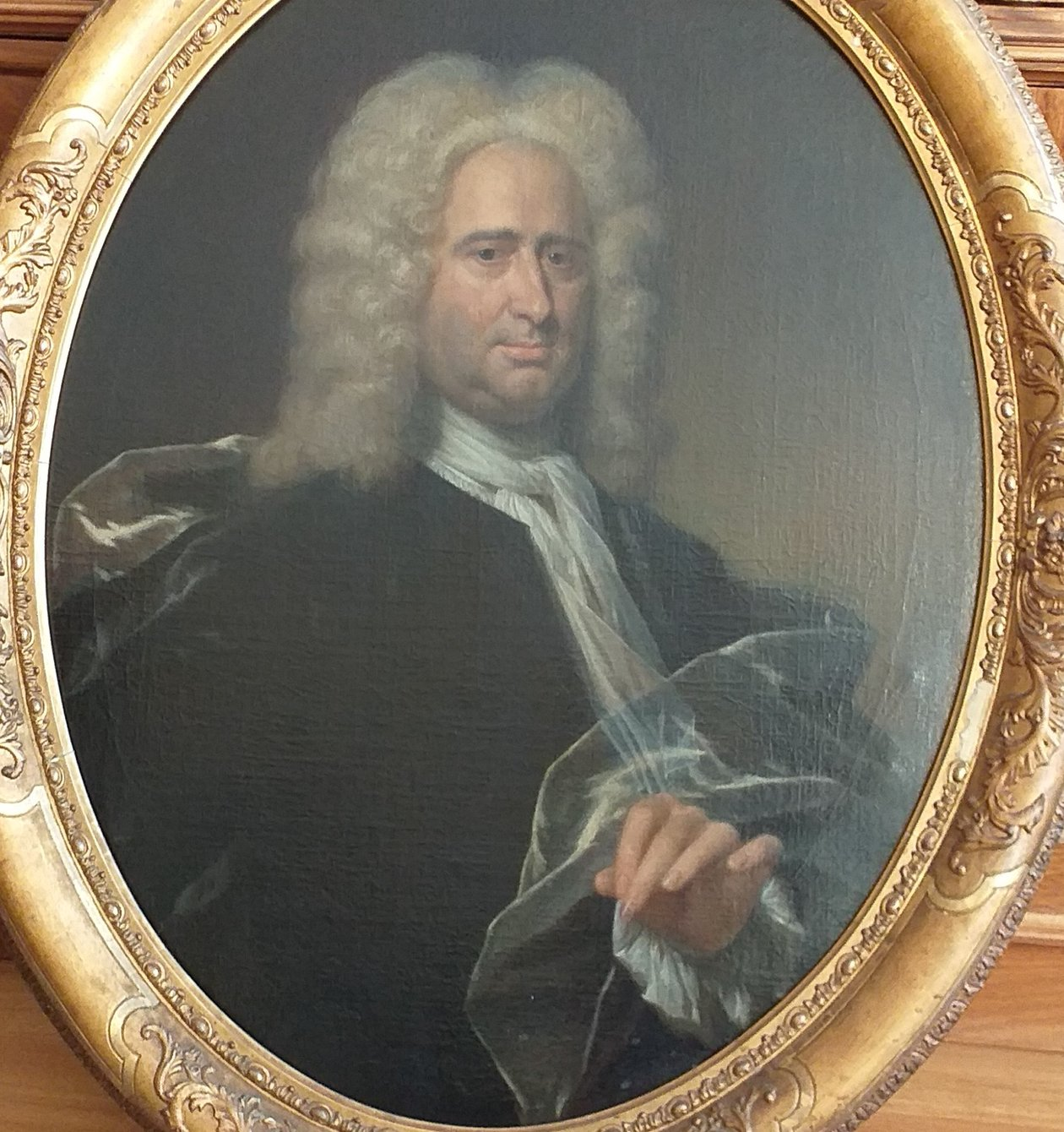
Simon van Slingelandt

Simon van Slingelandt

Simon van Slingelandt, lord of the manor of Patijnenburg (14 January 1664, in Dordrecht – 1 December 1736, in The Hague) was an influential Dutch politician and diplomat during the 18th century. He served as the Grand Pensionary of Holland, the most important political position in the Republic of the Seven United Netherlands, from 17 July 1727 until his death on 1 December 1736. Van Slingelandt is often regarded as a capable and pragmatic administrator and an effective diplomat.

Simon van Slingelandt was the son of Govert van Slingelandt, lord of Dubbeldam (1623–1690), pensionary of Rotterdam and ambassador to Prussia, Sweden, Poland (1656) and Denmark (1659). He was also the secretary of the Council of State in 1664

Before becoming Grand Pensionary Van Slingelandt wrote several reports as preparation for the second Great Assembly (Dutch Tweede Grote Vergadering, a kind of Constitutional Convention to reform the constitution of the Dutch Republic, 28 November 1716 – 14 September 1717), in which he proposed to give the Council of State ("Raad van State") more power. He was convinced of the necessity to restrict the power of the cities and the provinces in order to strengthen the central power of the republic. The Great Assembly however ended in failure when nothing came from Van Slingelandts proposed reforms.

Van Slingelandt additionally embarked on a mission to overcome the financial and administrative impasse with which the Republic was left in the wake of the War of the Spanish Succession. In his ‘Memory of redress of finances,’ he concluded "that the last war, in which the state has made greater efforts than her forces allowed for, has deranged the already very troubled finances of the Province of Holland and West Friesland to such an extent that the whole state is in danger of collapsing at the first unfortunate moment that will arise …". To address this issue, he initiated a comprehensive set of reform measures targeting the fragmented nature of the state apparatus, military command, and army finances. However, his fellow regents lacked both the means and the political determination to enact all of his proposed reforms.

When he became Grand Pensionary of the province of Holland, which contributed sixty percent of the tax income of the Republic, he became the most powerful Dutch statesman. Despite all the challenges he faced, Slingelandt, with the help of Treasurer Jacob Hop, successfully protected the state from bankruptcy and maintained its international reputation. Van Slingelandt was a staunch republican, who wanted to keep the House of Orange out of the centre of power. He also was a strong advocate of an alliance with Great Britain; otherwise, he thought, the United Provinces wouldn't survive. He mediated peace between Great Britain and Austria in 1732 on the eve of the War of the Polish Succession and between France and Austria in 1736. His interpretation of the representative nature of the Dutch government were controversial and polemical at the time. However in the long run his ideas had a profound influence and are well supported in modern scholarship.

Simon van Slingelandt, a Master of Laws, was married to Susanna de Wildt (1666-1722) and Johanna Margaretha van Coesvelt, his housemaid (1726-1736).

== Sources ==
- Van der Aa, Abraham Jacob (1874). "Mr. Simon van Slingelandt". Biographisch woordenboek der Nederlanden Deel 17. Tweede stuk.
- Brandon, Pepijn (2015). War, Capital, and the Dutch State (1588-1795). Brill.

Political offices
Preceded by Jacob Hop	Treasurer-General of the United Provinces; 1725–1727	Succeeded by Anthonie van der Heim
Preceded by Isaac van Hoornbeek	Grand Pensionary of Holland; 1727–1736	Succeeded by Anthonie van der Heim
