= Ruggles =

Ruggles may refer to:

== Places ==
- Ruggles, Ohio, United States, an unincorporated community
- Ruggles Township, Ashland County, Ohio
- Ruggles Park, a park in Fall River, Massachusetts, United States, on the National Register of Historic Places
- Ruggles Island, in the Falkland Islands
- Ruggles River, Nunavut, Canada

== People ==
- Ruggles (surname), a list of people
- Ruggles Wright (1793–1863), Canadian lumber merchant

== Other uses ==
- Ruggles station, an MBTA train, bus and subway station
- Ruggles Mine, an open-pit tourist mine in Grafton, New Hampshire, United States
- Ruggles Prize, for excellence in mathematics
- The Ruggles, an early American television sitcom (1949–52)
- The surname of the main characters in the book The Family from One End Street and its sequels

== See also ==
- Ruggles House (disambiguation)
- Ruggles of Red Gap (disambiguation)
