= Lucifer (play) =

1654 tragedy play

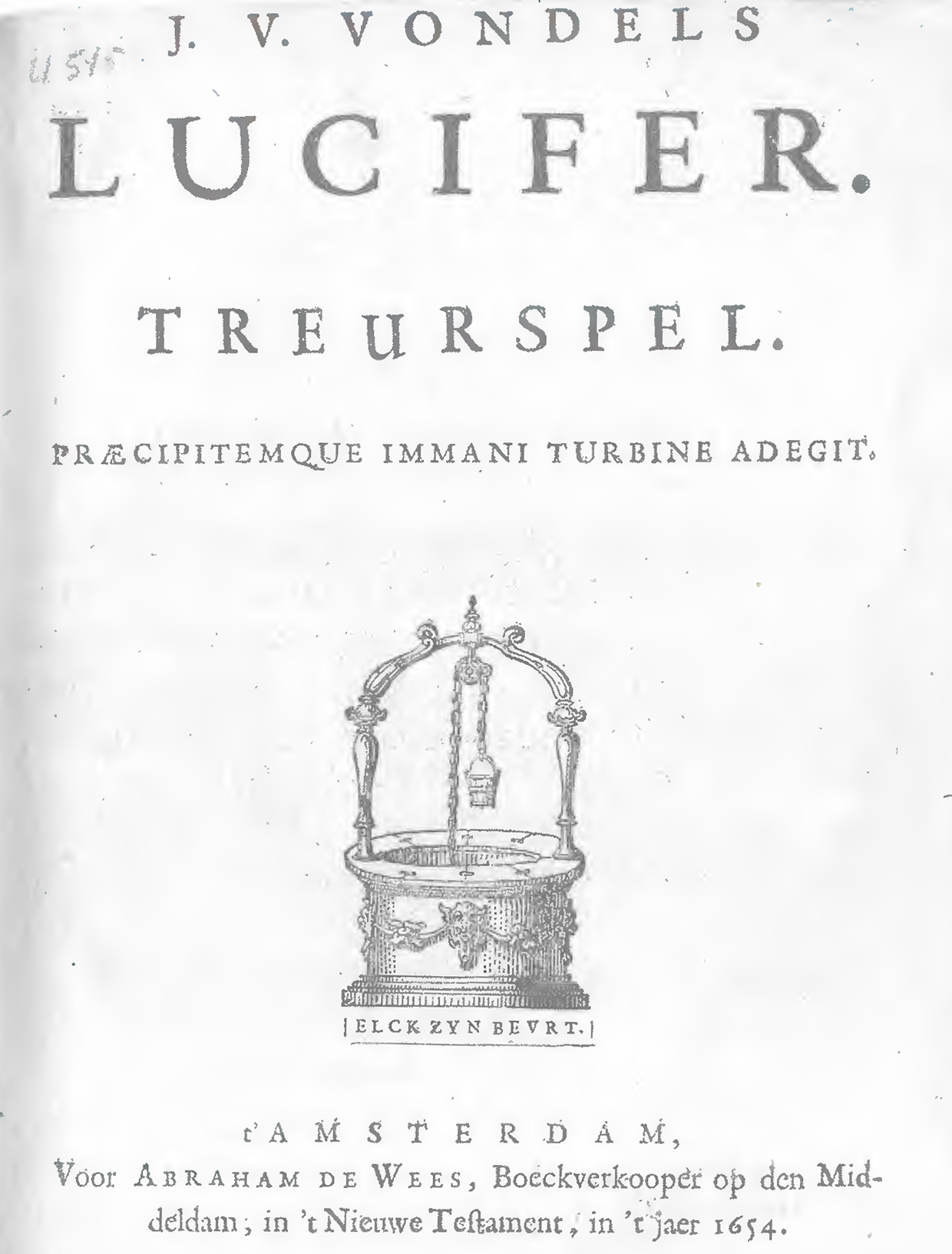
- The title page of the first edition from 1654.
- Original language: Early Modern Dutch
- Written by: Joost van den Vondel
- Characters: Lucifer; Beelzebub; Belial; Apollyon; Gabriel; Michael; Raphael; Uriel
- Genre: Tragedy
- Setting: Heaven

The play Lucifer is a 1654 tragedy set in Heaven, written by the Dutch playwright and poet Joost van den Vondel, and premiered on 2 February in the city theater of Amsterdam. When God decides to elevate Man above the Angels, the high-ranked angel Lucifer initiates a revolt which ends when archangel Michael ejects the revolters from Heaven with a bolt of lightning. Lucifer then avenges himself on earth by seducing Adam and Eve to commit original sin, causing their banishment from the Garden of Eden. After the second performance on February 5 the burgomasters of Amsterdam, pressed by the clergy, banned further performances. Lucifer is widely regarded as Vondel's masterpiece and one of the greatest works of Dutch literature. It has been said that Lucifer is "one of the rare products of Dutch literature that occupies a steady place in the Western canon."

As a young poet, Vondel associated the Lucifer character with the theme of unjust uprising. The many examples of Luciferism in international politics of the 1640s finally prompted him to give life to the Lucifer-conception inside him. The result is an original work: though all names derive from the Bible, the plot itself is not based on any existing story. In Vondels collected plays in two octavo volumes of 1662, edited by the playwright himself, Lucifer appears in the volume with non-Biblical plays.

Dedicated to kaiser Ferdinand III of the Holy Roman Empire, the play is written in alexandrines, with the choirs concluding each act in four- to three-foot iambes. The structure follows the five stages of classical Greek drama, yet timeless and spaceless Heaven does not accommodate all three of Aristotle's unities of time, place, and plot. Literary scholars have long been confused by the question whether the Fall of Man does obstruct the unity of plot. Another aspect of structure that provoked much discussion is the question whether Lucifer is already in the camp of evil from the start or if his character concurs with Aristotle's norm for a protagonist, and so in the course of the play, after much hesitation and contemplation, becomes a member of evil. Scholarly concentration upon the theological background of the play gradually gave way to study of themes such as free will, and the relation of belief versus reason. The tragedy's parallels to the political situation of Vondel's time, remarkable as they are, do not have such bearing as to constitute a political allegory.

After performance was forbidden, selling the text became officially illegal as well. Yet six reprintings of the quarto appeared in 1654 alone. The play was not performed again until the nineteenth century. In 1825 a British theory was launched, holding that Lucifer was a source for John Milton's Paradise Lost, which after initial acceptance was discredited in 1895. Lucifer has been translated into French, German, English, Hungarian and Japanese, among other languages.

== Plot ==
=== Act 1 ===
The angel Apollion returns from Paradise, where he has spied on Adam and Eve. Lucifer ordered him to do so, because God has decided to elevate man to a hierarchical level superior to the angels, who will have to serve man. Still under the impression of the beauty of both Paradise and Eve, he reports to Belzebub, who is concerned that men's capacity for reproducing will in time overshadow the power of the angels. Then the archangel Gabriel announces God's decision about the coming of Christ, whom the angels will have to revere. The choir praises the Lord and stresses the necessity to serve him.

=== Act 2 ===
Lucifer appears on his chariot, embittered by his degradation in rank. He swears to do anything in his power to prevent the elevation of man from happening. Belzebub agrees with him, citing the right of the firstborn as justification for the view that unjust is done. Lucifer would rather be expelled from heaven than to accept God's decision: "To be the first prince in some lower court/ Is better than within the Blessed Light/ be second, or even less." Lucifer asks Gabriel for an explanation, but the archangel Gabriël has no answers, but just presses Lucifer to unconditionally accept the decision. Lucifer replies that it touches God's honour to elevate the lowly creature man.

As soon as Gabriel leaves, Lucifer vows at all cost to prevent man's elevation, even if the world order must be destroyed. He then calls for Apollion, and announces his plan to eliminate archangel Michael, the commander of God's army of angels. Apollion responds by saying that even contemplating such a plan is blasphemy. Despite God's almighty and the strength of Michaels army, Belzebub believes in a chance to win. Lucifer orders Apollion and Belial to come up with a plan to wins as many angels as possible over to revolt.

Belial thinks up a catchy slogan for the revolt: "For all eternity,/ Mankind to lock without the gate of Heaven." They develop a plan in three stages: first, to stimulate uproar with false reason; second, Belzebub must attach his authority to the revolt with the acknowledgment of the grievance and the assurance that things should remain as they are now; third, Lucifer must become the leader by feigning reluctance to do so, and then feigning an override by Belzebub. The choir asks why there is darkness in heaven, and concludes that jealousy made it so.

=== Act 3 ===
The Luciferists, as the revolutionairies are called, are in dispute with the choir. Then Apollion and Belial arrive. Belial asks what the cause of the uproar might be, prompting the choir to call in their assistance. But Belial and Apollion show much understanding for the grievances and claim the revolters are justified in their jealousy. Now the choir warns the two not to stimulate the uproar.

The arrival of Belzebub sets phase two in motion. Belzebub behaves like an officer who catches his men in an uproar. He asks what the matter is, and the Luciferists offer him the leadership of their gang. He responds that negotiations with God are called for. The Luciferists, running out of patience, demand violence, strength, and revenge. Belzebub feigns to prefer a peaceful solution or the conflict.

According to the plan Lucifer should now appear, but instead Michael arrives. He acts like a general and places the responsibility for the uproar upon the highest in rank, Belzebub. Michael warns that negotiating is allowed, but resistance is not. This does not quite work out as expected, the Luciferists demand that no servants in heaven are ranked below earthlings, and threaten with violence. Michael orders the Luciferisten to withdraw, and to lay down their weapons. As both orders are ignored, Michael sneers: "No longer art thou sons of the Light." His third and last order is that the good angels secede themselves from the bad angels. He leaves with the choir, leaving the Luciferists with Belzebub, whose doubleplay is now over.

Lucifer arrives, speeches to the mob. They offer him the hatchet, but he pretends not to want a war, but the Luciferists reject his reasoning. He accepts the position of leader of the revolt: "I console myself to turn violence with violence." gewelt te keeren met gewelt." Belzebub underscores the decision with incense and candles. The choir complains about the envy and deceit.

=== Act 4 ===
As the smell of incense reaches the highest realm of heaven, Gabriel informs Michael that it is time to confront Lucifer and his gang. His servant Uriël brings his weaponry, while archangel Rafael, who personifies God's mercy, tries to make Lucifer change his mind. He makes Lucifer doubt his revolt, but ultimately he believes mercy is still impossible. Rafael warns Lucifer for the penalty of not only being cast out of heaven, but acquiring the appearance of an ugly dragon in the process.

Rafael accuses Lucifer of pride and envy, but also offers him a last chance. This prompts Lucifer to declare his "despair soliloquy" in which he acknowledges that his revolt against God is unjustified. But he still believes mercy is impossible, and when Gabriel sounds his trumpet that the battle is to begin, Lucifer is ready for war. In a final gesture to prevent this, Rafael prays with the choir or Lucifer.

=== Act 5 ===
After the battle is over, Urriel reports to Rafaël how it went. The crucial moment was when Lucifer with his axe hit upon Michael's shield with God's name in diamond on it. With a bolt of lightning Michael throws Lucifer to the earth. During his fall, Lucifer changes into a monster, a genuine devil.

After the report the choir sings to Michael. But then Gabriel arrives with the news of the fall of man. On earth, Lucifer lost no time seeking his revenge, and already succeeded in seducing Adam and Eve to eat from the forbidden tree. Michael orders Uriel to banish Adam and Eve from Paradise. The choir prays for the arrival of the Messiah.

== Reception ==
=== Debate over influence upon Milton's Paradise Lost ===
In 1825 two English poets suggested Vondel's Lucifer influenced Paradise Lost, the poem John Milton began composing in 1658, four years after the publication of Lucifer. Robert Southey wrote, possibly at the suggestion of his friend the Dutch poet Willem Bilderdijk, that Milton would have been familiar with both Vondel's Lucifer and his Adam in Exile. Thomas Lovell Beddoes restricts his assumption of Vondel's influence to Lucifer. Milton knew some Dutch and may have had some interest in the Dutch opinion of Cromwell's revolution. According Milton's Dutch translator Peter Verstegen, however, Milton's mastery of Dutch was not sufficient to read Vondel's tragedies. Whenever Milton communicated with Dutchmen, the language was Latin. Milton would then be sooner familiar with Grotius' Adamus exul than with Vondel's emulation of that tragedy, Adam in Exile.

Yet in 1854 Rev. A. Fishel confirmed Beddoes's suggestion, prompting a debate between twelve Dutch, British, Germans, and French scholars that ran until 1903. In 1877 Critic Edmund Gosse published an essay on Vondel called A Dutch Milton, in which he claimed that at least Book six of Milton's epic was influenced by Lucifer. In 1885 the British clergyman George Edmundson published his book Milton and Vondel. A Curiosity of Literature, in which he argued that Lucifer supplied the basis for Milton. Ten years later, this claim was refuted by J.J. Moolhuizen in his dissertation "Vondel's Lucifer and Milton's Paradise Lost", written in Dutch (Vondels Lucifer en Miltons Verloren Paradijs, The Hague, Martinus Nijhoff publishers, 1895), written with, in the words of Vondel scholar Molkenboer, "a sense of justice only equalled by his sharp analytical insight." Moolhuizen showed that the so-called parallel verses by Vondel were of Edmundson's own making by way of additions and eliminations in his translation. Molkenboer points out "the irony, that the laurel, offered our major poet so chivalrous by an Englishman for having fertilized Milton's genius, was rejected just as chivalrous by a Dutchman."

Since then, the consensus among Dutch scholars is that the similarities between the two works of literature are of too general a nature to speak of direct influence: Vondel and Milton just chose the same Biblical material to build upon. British historian J.L. Price states in neutral terms that Vondel in Lucifer treats the same problems as Milton does in Paradise Lost. As late as 1966 Charles Delmer Tate showed in his dissertation on Milton and Vondel that in the nineteenth century Vondel remained unknown in Britain and that before that century not one British library held a copy of his writings.

== Sources ==
=== English translation of Lucifer ===
- Noppen, Leonard Charles van (1898). Vondel's Lucifer. Greensboro, North Carolina, online

=== Secondary sources ===
- Edmundson, George (1885). Milton and Vondel: A Curiosity of Literature. London: Trübner & Co, Ludgate Hill.
- Molkenboer, B. H. (ed). (1922). Vondels Lucifer. Zwolsche herdrukken no. 3/4. Zwolle: W.E.J. Tjeenk Willink.
- Porteman, Karel and Mieke B. Smits-Veldt (2008). Een nieuw vaderland voor de muzen. Geschiedenis van de Nederlandse literatuur 1560-1700. [A New Fatherland for the Muses. History of Dutch Literature 1560-1700]. Amsterdam: Bert Bakker, online (4th Printing, 2016)
- Price, J.L. (1976). Nederlandse cultuur in de gouden eeuw. Vertaling Olga de Marez Oyens. Oorspronkelijke titel: Culture and Society in the Dutch Republic During the 17th Century, 1974. Utrecht/Antwerpen: Uitgeverij Het Spectrum. ISBN 9027458391
- Rens, Lieven (ed.) (1979). Lucifer. Treurspel. Ingeleid en van aantekeningen voorzien door Prof. Dr. Lieven Rens. Den Haag: Martinus Nijhoff.
- Schenkeveld-Van der Dussen, Riet (ed.) (2004). Lucifer. Adam in ballingschap. Noah. Amsterdam: Uitgeverij Bert Bakker. ISBN 9035127382
- Smit, W.A.P. (1959). 'Hoofdstuk II: Lucifer 1654.' Van Pascha tot Noah. Een verkenning van Vondels drama's naar continuïteit en ontwikkeling in hun grondmotief en structuur door - Deel 2: Salomon - Koning Edipus. Eerste druk 1959. Tweede druk, W.E.J. Tjeenk Willink, Zwolle 1970, p. 54-180. ISBN 9011917022
- Sterck, J.F.M. e.a. (eds.) (1931). Lucifer. Bewerkt door Lr. B.H. Molkenboer O.P. In J.FM. Sterck e.a. (eds.), De werken van Vondel. Deel 5, 1646-1656. Amsterdam: De maatschappij voor goede en goedkoope lectuur (WB-editie), p. 601-696.
- Verstegen, Peter (2003). 'Appendix: Milton en Vondel'. In: John Milton, Het paradijs verloren. Met alle prenten van Gustave Dore. Vertaald door Peter Verstegen. Amsterdam: Athenaeum - Polak & Van Gennep ISBN 9025334059
