= Ruggles-Brise =

Ruggles-Brise is a surname. Notable people include:

- Dorothea Ruggles-Brise (1866–1937), Scottish folk song collector
- Edward Ruggles-Brise (1822–1942), British Conservative Party politician
- Evelyn Ruggles-Brise (1857–1935), British prison administrator and reformer
- Guy Ruggles-Brise (1914–2000), British Army officer, and High Sheriff of Essex
- Harold Ruggles-Brise (1864–1927), British Army officer
- John Ruggles-Brise (1908–2007), Lord Lieutenant of Essex
- Samuel Ruggles-Brise (1825–1899), British Conservative Party politician

== See also ==
- Ruggles (surname)
- Brise (disambiguation)
