= Brise =

Brise, Brisé or Briše may refer to:

- Brisé (dance), a type of jump in ballet
- "Brisé" (song), Maître Gims 2015
- Brisé (music), Style brisé (French: "broken style"), Baroque music

== Places ==
- Briše, Kamnik, Slovenia
- Briše pri Polhovem Gradcu
- Briše, Zagorje ob Savi

== People ==
- Ruggles-Brise, a surname
- Ruggles-Brise baronets, Essex
- Ronald Brisé (born 1974)
- Cornelis Brisé (1622–1670), Dutch Golden Age painter
- Tony Brise (1952–1975), English racing driver

== See also ==
- Brise soleil ("sun break"), an architectural feature
- Brise-Glace (French "ice-breaker", as in the type of boat), 1990s instrumental avant-rock "supergroup"
- Jolie Brise, ship 1913
