= Cornelis Brisé =

Dutch Golden Age painter

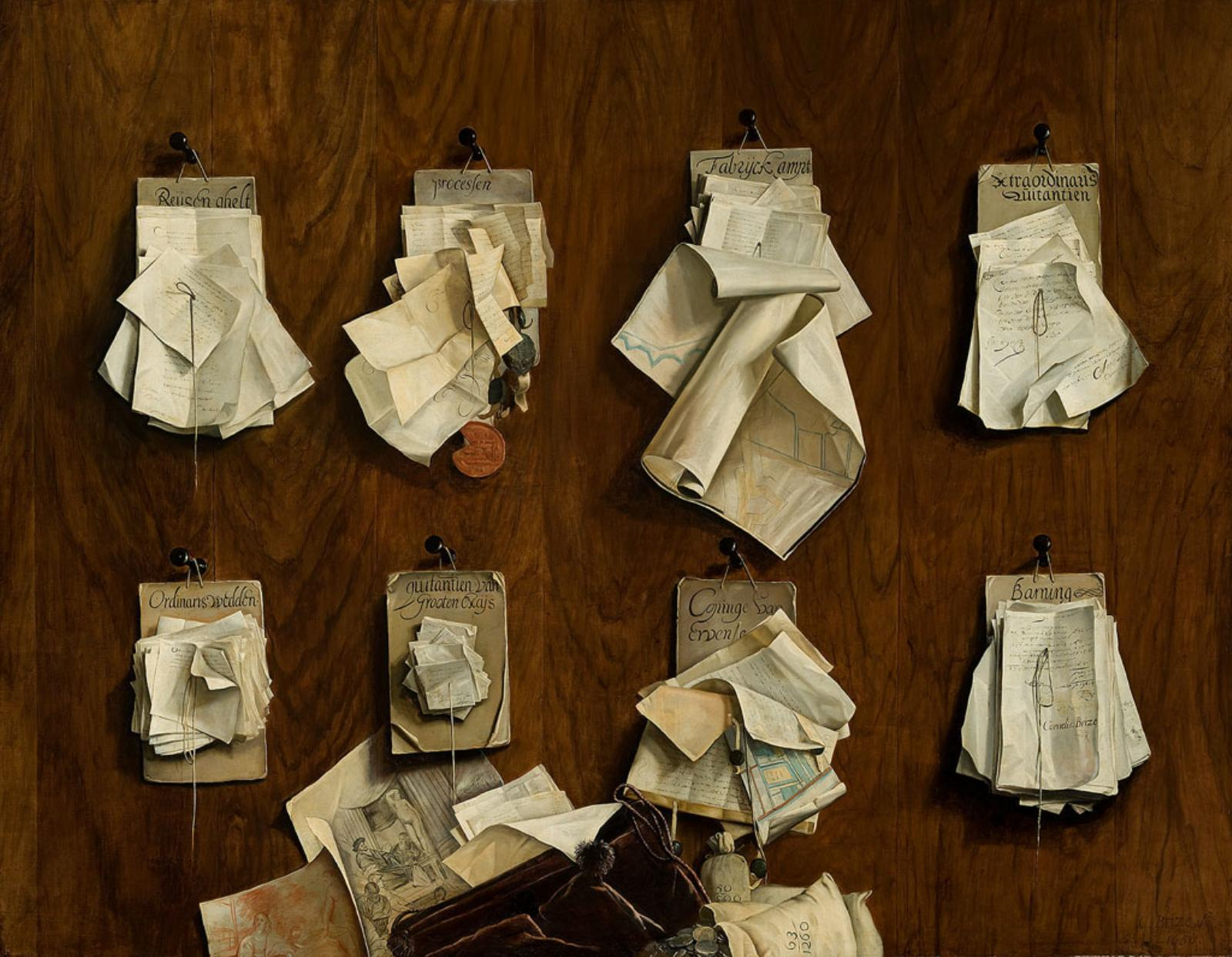
- Documents on the Treasury wall of the Amsterdam city hall, in 1656 by Cornelis Brizé.
- Born: 1622; Haarlem
- Died: 1670 (aged 47–48); Amsterdam
- Known for: still life painting
- Movement: Baroque

Cornelis Brisé (also Brisée, Bresee, Brizé, and Brizée) (1622, Haarlem - 1670, Amsterdam) was a Dutch Golden Age painter.

== Biography ==
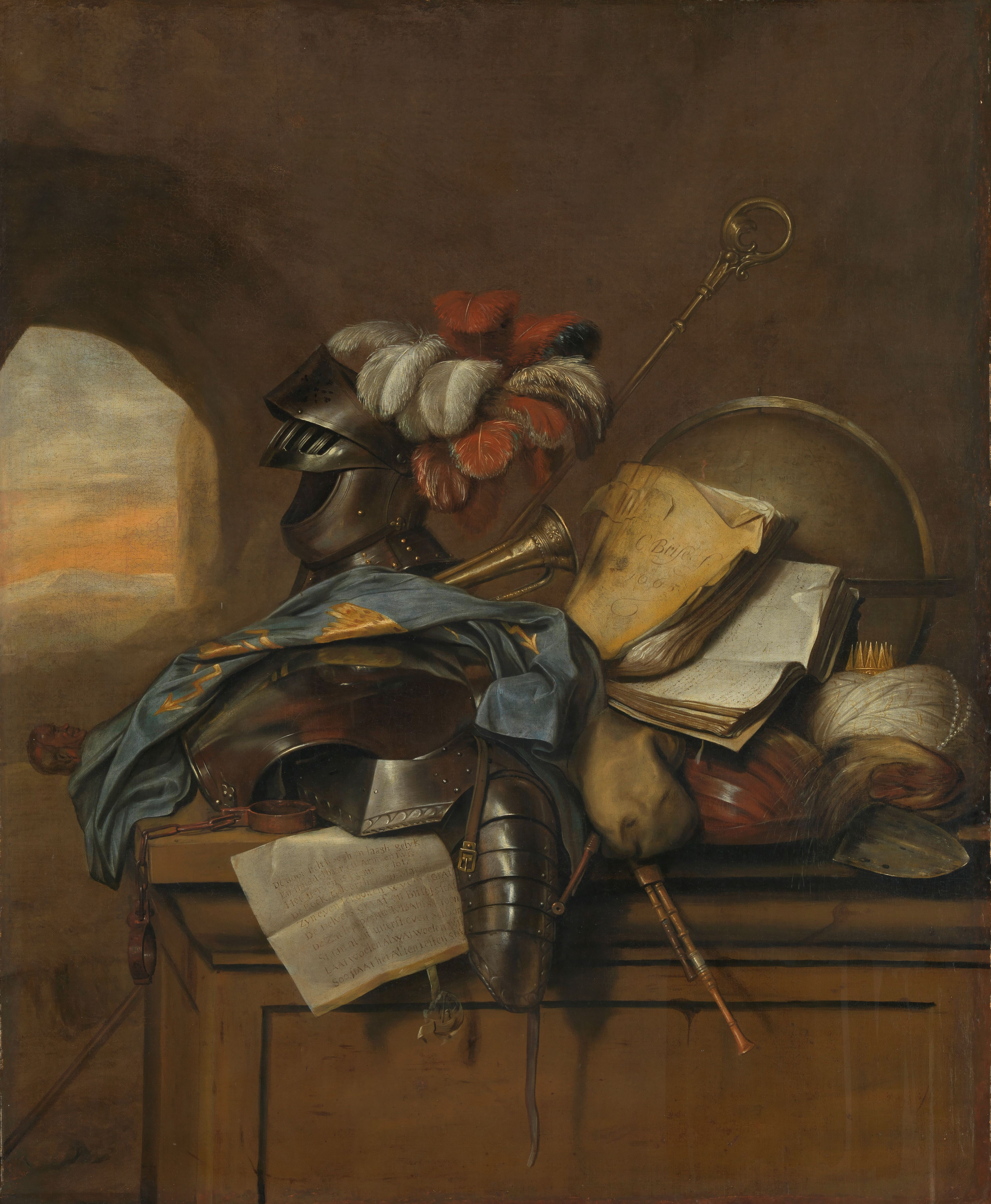
Vanitas still life from Rijksmuseum Amsterdam

He made a trip to Rome in 1642, but in 1655 he was back in the Netherlands where he settled in Amsterdam. According to Houbraken he was specialized in all sorts of still life painting, including harness, which was considered the most difficult object to paint. His two and a half meters wide documents on the wall in trompe-l'œil were immortalized by Joost van den Vondel. His painting in the Amsterdam treasury is one of the most well-documented paintings of the century, appearing in period travelogues and state inventories. The painting hangs today on the original wall of the Treasury in the Royal Palace of Amsterdam, but since visitors can only peek in the room from the entrance, the painting can only be viewed sideways. The rest of the room is furnished as a bedroom in the 'Empire' style today, since that became the room's purpose during the French occupation at the close of the 18th century.
