= Joost van den Vondel =

Dutch poet and writer (1587–1679)

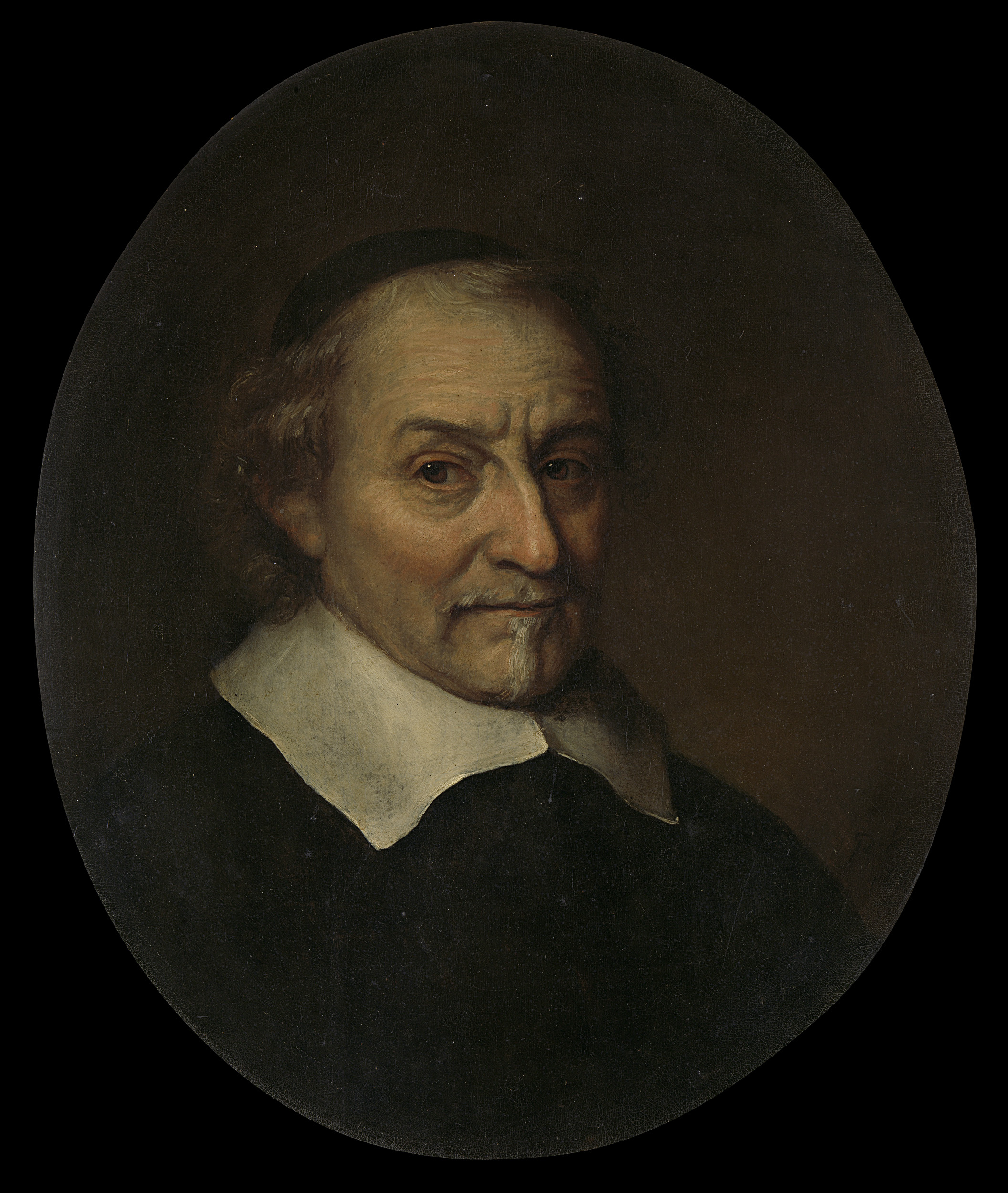
- Portrait by Philips Koninck, 1665
- Born: 17 November 1587; Cologne, Holy Roman Empire
- Died: 5 February 1679 (aged 91); Amsterdam, Dutch Republic
- Occupations: Playwright; poet; translator
- Spouse: Mayken de Wolff (m. 1610; died 1635)
- Children: 5
- Writing career
- Period: Dutch Golden Age
- Movement: Baroque

Joost van den Vondel (Dutch: [ˈjoːst fɑn də(ɱ) ˈvɔndəl]; (Note: Van and den in isolation: [vɑn], [dɛn].) 17 November 1587 – 5 February 1679) was a Dutch playwright, poet, literary translator and writer. He is generally regarded as the greatest writer in the Dutch language as well as an important figure in the history of Western literature. In his native country, Vondel is often called the "Prince of Poets" and the Dutch language is sometimes referred to as "the language of Vondel". His oeuvre consists of 33 plays, a large number of poems in different genres and forms, an epic poem and many translations of predominantly classical literature. Vondel lived in the Dutch Republic during the Eighty Years' War and became the leading literary figure of the Dutch Golden Age.

Although Vondel was born in Cologne, his family, who were Mennonites, originally came from Antwerp, but had to flee after the fall of the city in 1585. They settled in Cologne, but were persecuted there as well. Eventually they moved to Amsterdam in the then newly formed Dutch Republic. In Amsterdam, Vondel joined the Chamber of rhetoric, a literary society where members studied and composed poetry together. This was the start of his long career as a writer. In 1610 he married Mayken de Wolff, with whom he had five children, of which three died in infancy. A pivotal moment in Vondel's life was his conversion to Catholicism, which was met with controversy in the then dominant Protestant society of the Dutch Republic. In his later life Vondel dedicated himself almost exclusively to his dramatic work and religious poetry. He wrote plays until he was 80 years old and eventually died in Amsterdam at the age of 91.

Vondel's earliest known poem dates from 1605. The first play Vondel wrote was Het Pascha in 1612 and his last Noach, written in 1667. Vondel primarily wrote tragedies, of which a great deal were written in the period between 1654 and 1667. Although his Palamedes (1625) and Gijsbrecht van Aemstel (1637) are acclaimed works, the tragedies he wrote after 1654 are considered to be the highlights of his oeuvre. Plays like Lucifer, Jeptha of Offerbelofte, Adam in ballingschap (Adam in exile) and Noach are among Vondel's most celebrated works and are consistently ranked among the greatest works of Dutch literature. Especially Lucifer is almost by common consent regarded as Vondel's masterpiece. Like his plays, Vondel's poetry is acclaimed as well, in particular for the virtuosic style and mastery of verse. Notable poems include Het stockske van Oldenbarneveldt ("The Cane of Oldenbarnevelt"), Roskam (Curry Comb) and Kinder-lijck (Childlike), about the death of his son.

== Life ==
=== Early life ===
Vondel was born on 17 November 1587 on the Große Witschgasse in the Free imperial city of Cologne, Holy Roman Empire. His family were originally Catholics from Antwerp (at the time part of the Spanish Netherlands), but had to flee in 1585 after the fall of the city, for becoming Anabaptists of the Mennonite faith. His father, also named Joost van den Vondel, and mother, Sara Cranen (who was the daughter of Peter Cranen, an important poet from Antwerp), lived in Cologne when their eldest son Joost was born. As Mennonites, however, they were barely tolerated in Cologne and eventually the repression against Mennonites grew to such an extent that, in 1595, the city officials informed that all local Mennonites had to leave Cologne within fourteen days. The Vondel family was left adrift and lived at Frankfurt am Main, Bremen, Emden, and Utrecht, before eventually settling at Amsterdam in the newly formed Dutch Republic.

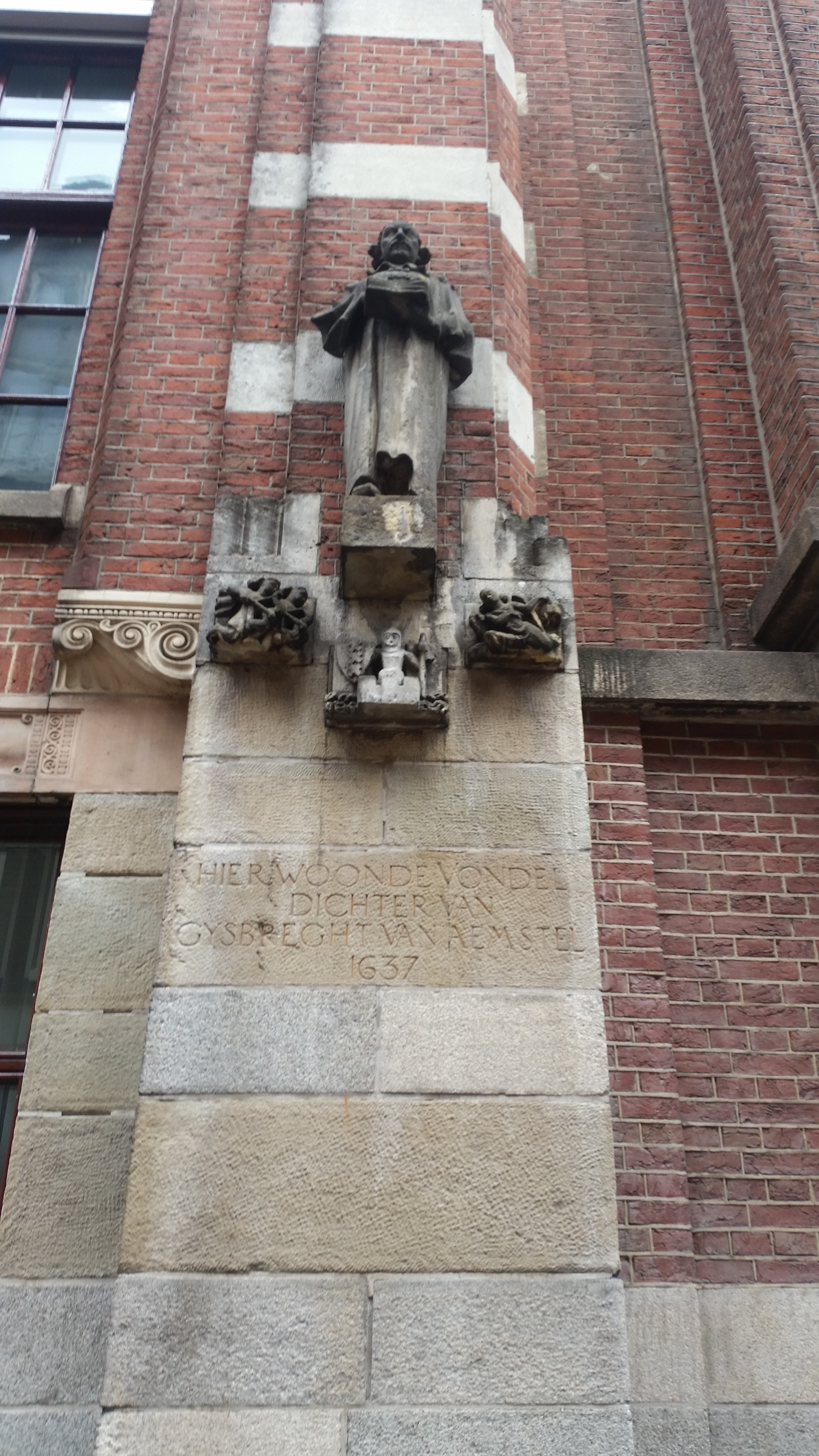
Vondel's statue at the Warmoestraat by Gerarda Rueter. The house where Vondel lived for many years no longer exists and to commemorate him a statue has been erected.

Joost van den Vondel the Elder managed to acquire Dutch citizenship, which enabled him to set up a business, on 27 March 1597, and he became a silk merchant on the Warmoesstraat. Amsterdam at the time was in the process of taking over the position of Antwerp as the most important trading centre of the Low Countries and was soon becoming the wealthiest city of the Dutch Republic. In part this was made possible by the enormous influx of migrants, chiefly from the Southern Netherlands (roughly 60.000 to 80.000 people migrated from the south to Amsterdam, on a population of around 115.000 in 1622). These migrants brought their own (literary) culture, especially the Chamber of rhetoric - a literary society that occupied an important place in the culture of the Low Countries - that would prove to be vital for the (literary) upbringing of Vondel.

Vondel's parents valued good education and made sure their son went to a proper school. It is thought that Vondel may have been a pupil of the famous mathematician and educator Willem Bartjens, to whom he would later dedicate an ode. Apart from mathematics, Bartjens taught German, French and wrote poems. Not long after Vondel received his first education he started writing poems. Vondel's first biographer, Gerard Brandt, remarked that Vondel was very young when he first started writing poetry. It is not known how old Vondel was when he wrote his first poems, though his earliest known poem dates from 1605 and was written when he was 17 years old. The poem was written for the marriage of a girl in his neighborhood and was signed with Liefde verwinnet al (Love conquers all), with which Vondel signed all of his early verses. By 1606 he was a member of the Chamber of rhetoric Het Wit Lavendel (The White Lavender), a literary society founded by Flemish Protestant refugees from the Spanish Netherlands. The choice for this Chamber of rhetoric was understandable considering the recent history of Vondel's family. It was here where Vondel wrote the first of his occasional poetry. In 1606 he received Mennonite adult baptism from the congregation led by Cornelis Claesz Anslo and the following year his father died, so Vondel was brought into the family silk business as a partner. Vondel's early poetry was still heavily influenced by the Flemish poetry of the Chamber of rhetoric, especially the poetry of fellow Mennonite Karel van Mander. His early poems were eventually anthologized in the work Den nieuwen verbeterden lust-hof (The New Improved Pleasure Garden) of 1607. In the last months of 1610 Vondel married Mayken de Wolff, with whom he had five children, of which three died in infancy.

=== Early works ===
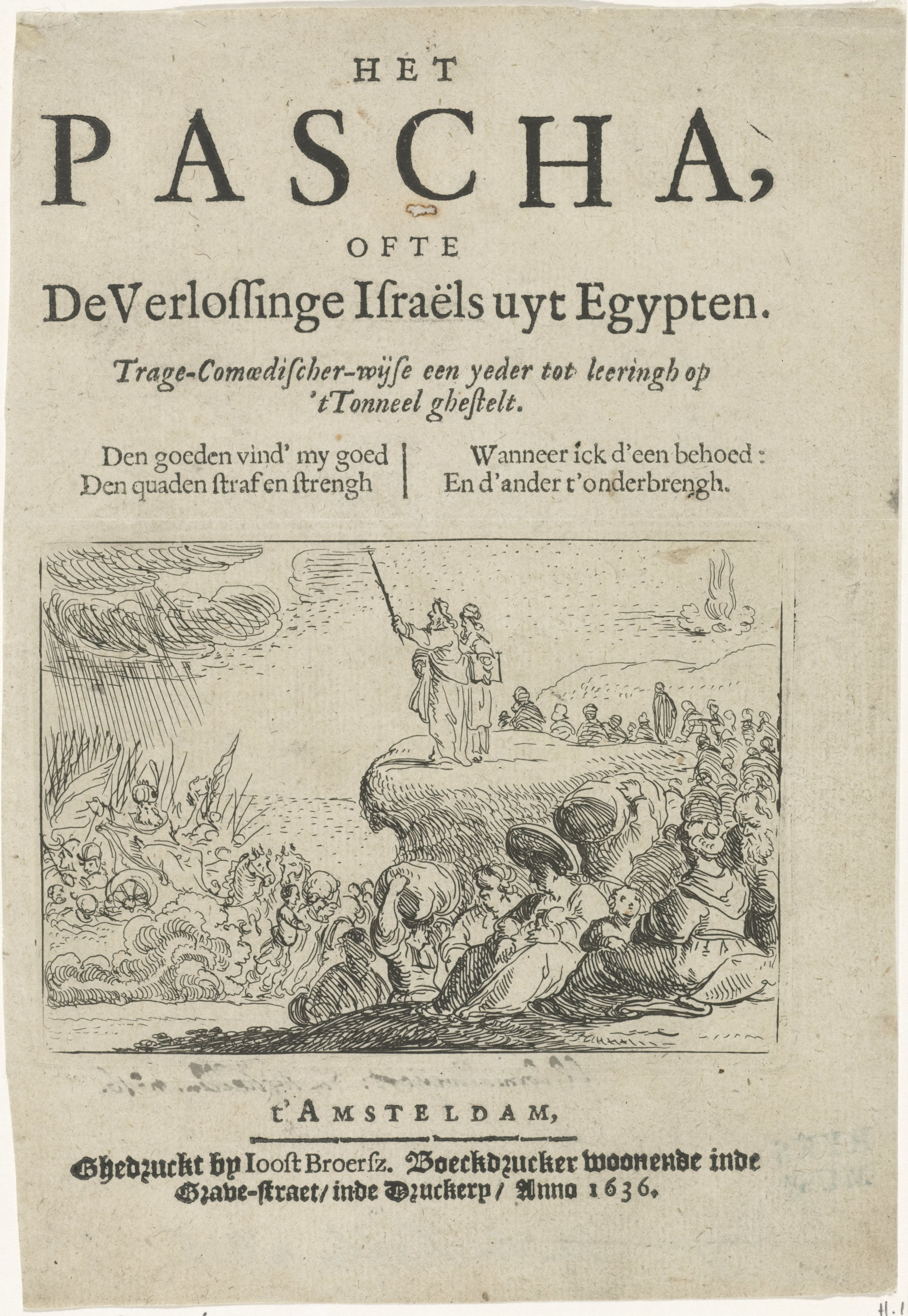
The frontispice of Vondel's first play Het Pascha, which shows an image of Moses and the destruction of the army of the farao in the Red Sea.

In 1612 Vondel wrote his first play titled Het Pascha (Passover), which dramatizes the events of the Book of Exodus and features an epilogue comparing the liberation of the enslaved Israelites from Biblical Egypt to Christ's redemption of the human race and to the success of the Dutch Revolt against King Philip II of Spain, which was still ongoing at the time when Vondel wrote his play. It has been said that, though the power and splendor of his verse is already apparent in Het Pascha, it also lacked consistency. Nonetheless, the work was received well by both the public and critics, and was praised by Gerbrand Bredero in an ode. Apart from the virtuosic poetry, Het Pascha already contained two important aspects that would later turn out to be exemplary for Vondel's work: firstly the usage of literature to comment on political matters, and secondly an admiration for classical antiquity. After this Vondel continued to write occasional poetry and went on to write the play Hierusalem verwoest (Jerusalem destroyed) in 1620. This work was the first play that was structurally entirely based upon classical literature, in this case Seneca's Troades. Apart from classical literature, Vondel's work also underwent a strong influence from French literature, in the case of Hierusalem verwoest the work of Robert Garnier, and in general the work of Guillaume de Salluste Du Bartas. In the period between 1613 and 1620 Vondel learnt Latin at the local Latin school, and by 1620 he was able to read the most important Latin writers, particularly Virgil, Seneca and later Ovid.

In this period two other significant events occurred in his life. Firstly, Vondel apparently recovered from what Gerard Brandt called "a long, languishing sickness, which greatly weakened him, exhausting his spirits and making him long for death". It is now thought that Vondel probably suffered from depression, since he mentioned he was suffering from "melancholia" in a letter. Secondly, in 1618 the tragedy of the arrest and execution of Johan van Oldenbarnevelt happened, which may also have contributed to Vondel's melancholy. At the time there was a conflict in the Dutch Republic between the Arminians (also called Remonstrants) on the one side, and the Calvinists led by Franciscus Gomarus (also called Counter-Remonstrants), on the other side. Vondel, who gradually became one of the most vocal advocates for religious toleration, sided with the Arminians and had great admiration for the religious tolerance propagated by Johan van Oldenbarnevelt (who was not only the political leader of the Remonstrants, but also as Land's Advocate the de facto leader of the Dutch Republic). As a consequence, the trial and subsequent execution of Johan van Oldenbarnevelt by Maurice of Orange not only had a great impact on Vondel, it also resulted in religious persecution of followers of Roman Catholicism, Anabaptism and Arminianism.

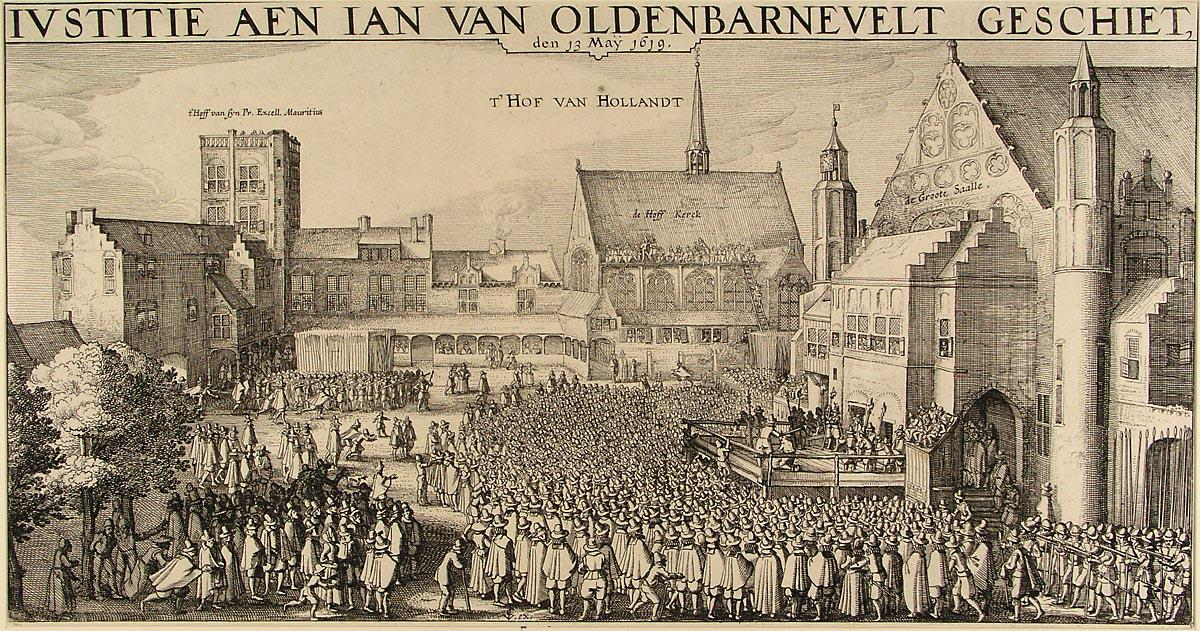
The execution of Johan van Oldenbarnevelt in 1619 on the Binnenhof in The Hague; one of the most significant moments in the life of Vondel. The illustration is by Claes Jansz. Visscher.

Apart from the effect that this event had on Vondel personally, especially with regard to his mental health, it also led him to put his outrage into words; even five years later, in 1625, when he published his play Palamedes. There probably is no other play in the Dutch literature of the 17th century that sparked so much controversy and conversation. Although the play dealt with a minor story from the Trojan War - namely the betrayal of Palamedes by Odysseus and Diomedes (supported by the commander of the Greeks, Agamemnon) - the story was in reality an allusion on the trial and execution of Johan van Oldenbarnevelt. In the play, the unjust killing of Palamedes represents the unfair trial of Van Oldenbarnevelt, and likewise, the tyrannical Agamemnon represents the dictatorial behavior of Maurice of Orange. Although the play is an allusion, it was never Vondel's intention to conceal the message for his readers, nor were the connotations to Van Oldenbarnevelt a mystery to the contemporary audience; everyone immediately understood what the play was really about. Also the fact that Vondel put his name on the title page and sent a copy of the work to his colleague Constantijn Huygens, indicates that he had no problem to make a statement under his own name. Although this affair eventually led him to be heavily fined by the authorities, his play, however, proved to be widely popular and went through seven editions.

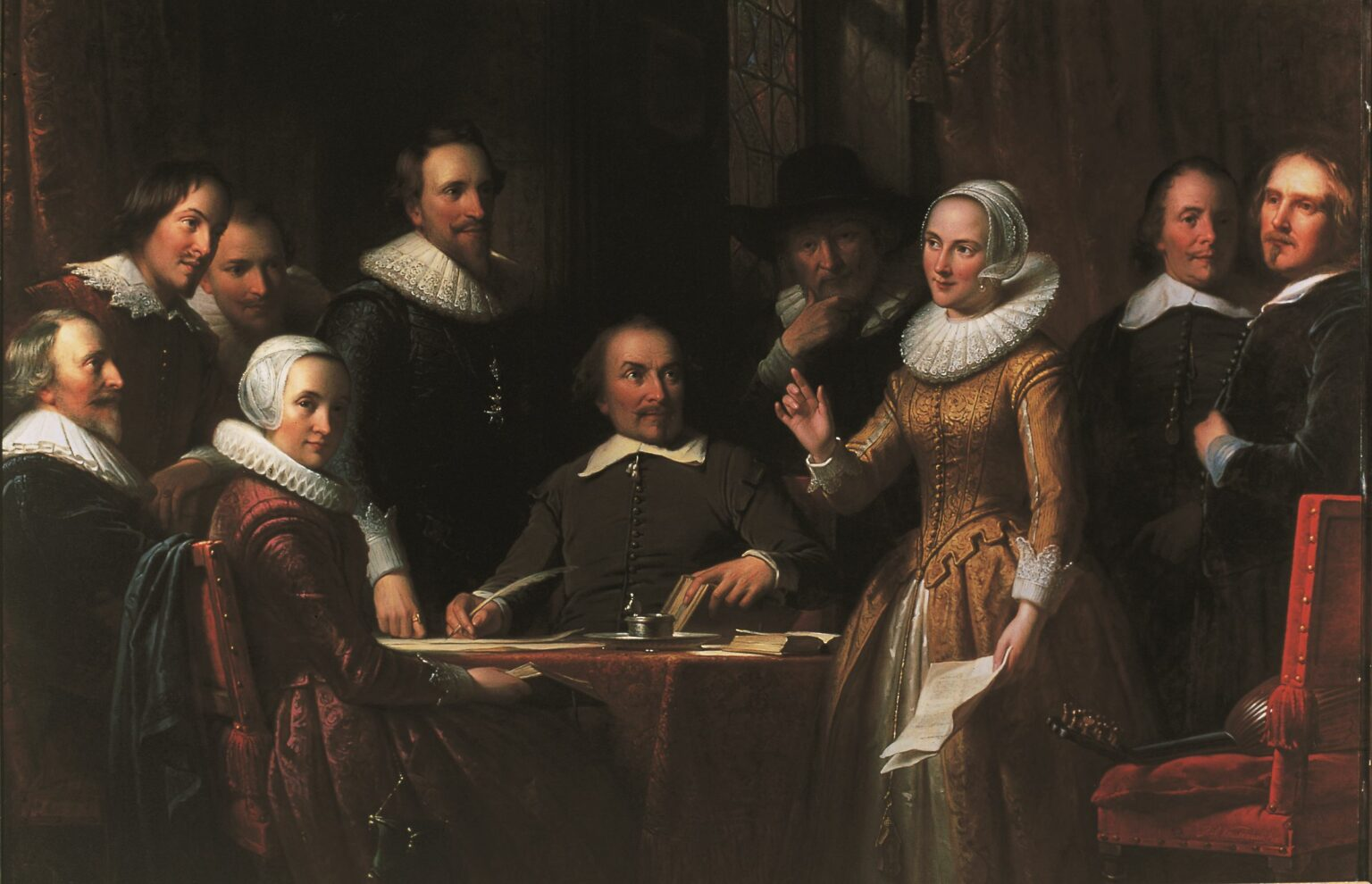
A painting by Jan Adam Kruseman of the Muiderkring; a group of scholars and writers who regularly met during the Dutch Golden Age at the castle of Muiden

Around the same time Vondel made acquaintance with the poet Pieter Corneliszoon Hooft at the home of fellow poet Roemer Visscher, who died shortly after they met in 1620. It was there that Vondel also met the two daughters of Roemer Visscher who were talented poets as well: Maria Tesselschade Visscher and Anna Visscher. These meetings at the house of Roemer would later continue with a more diverse group of people, including Constantijn Huygens, Gerbrand Bredero, Casparus Barlaeus, Gerardus Vossius, Dirck Sweelinck (the son of Jan Pieterszoon) and P.C. Hooft as the central figure. This gathering of people, who represented the culture and science of the Dutch Republic, would later be referred to as the Muiderkring and would get a legendary status in the cultural history of The Netherlands. As a result of the meetings at the house of Roemer Visscher, Vondel would write one of his greatest poems, Het lof der zee-vaert (The Praise of Seafaring), a secular 478-verse poem with the subject of overseas trade as a means to provide peace and prosperity. The poem ends with a direct reference to the meetings at the house of Roemer Visscher.

Whose floor is trod, whose threshold is worn down
By Painters, Artists, Singers, and Poets of renown. (Note: "Wiens vloer betreden word, wiens dorpel is gesleten / Van Schilders, kunstenaers, van Sangers, en Poëten.")

— Het lof der zee-vaert (The Praise of Seafaring), 478

After the publication of Palamedes and the controversy that followed, Vondel went into another period of melancholy, but he recovered quickly and after that he published poems in quick succession. Besides The Praise of Seafaring, the most notable of these poems is the long poem Roskam (Curry Comb) wherein he denounced the selfishness and greed of the regents. Roskam is one of the many satires Vondel wrote throughout his life, most notably in the form of poetry, but also in the form of plays like Palamedes.

=== Conversion to Catholicism ===
After Maurice of Orange died in 1625, he was succeeded by his half-brother Frederick Henry, who was eventually capable of reconciling the differences within the Dutch Republic. In 1630, the council of Amsterdam even granted the Remonstrants new freedom of worship, which was praised by Vondel in his Inwying van den Christen tempel t’Amsterdam (Consecration of the Christian Temple of Amsterdam). Around the same time Vondel was elected dean or "prince" of the Chamber of rhetoric Het Wit Lavendel of which he was a member since his youth. An important event that occurred a year later was the founding of the Athenaeum Illustre of Amsterdam in 1631, the predecessor of the University of Amsterdam, with Gerard Vossius and Caspar Barlaeus as the first professors; two of Vondel's close friends. Both would remain in contact with him, especially Vossius, whose library would provide Vondel with a wealth of knowledge which he would draw upon when writing his later tragedies.

Later that year, Hugo Grotius, who, after his trial, received a prison sentence and famously escaped from Loevestein Castle, returned from exile in France in the hope of receiving rehabilitation. Vondel now finally met the scholar he admired so much and was able to have a conversation with him about the conception of a "Christian-classical epic" in emulation of the classical poet Virgil and the Christian poet Torquato Tasso. The work in progress, called Constantinade, was to be based on the life of Constantine the Great, after whom Vondel also named his recently born son. Grotius apparently approved of the idea, since Grotius had sympathy for a general reconciliation between Christians, based on law and ecclesiastical history, such as the situation of the early church in the first few centuries AD; an idea that was in accordance with Vondel's own pleas for peace and toleration. Not long after this meeting, in 1632, Vondel's son Constantine died. As a consequence Vondel wrote the poem Kinder-lijck (meaning both Child-like [sic] and Child's corpse – cf. the obsolete English word 'lych'), to express his grief. This work eventually went on to become one of the most famous poems in the history of Dutch literature.

Infant fairest - beauty rarest -
Who repairest from above;
Whose sweet smiling, woe-beguiling,
Lights us with a heavenly love.
Mother! mourn not - I return not -
Wherefore learn not to be blest?
Heaven's my home now, where I roam now -
I an angel, and at rest.
Why distress thee? Still I'll bless thee -
Still caress thee, though I'm fled;
Cheer life's dullness - pour heaven's fullness
Of bright glory on thy head.
Leave behind thee thoughts that bind thee -
Dreams that blind thee in their glare:
Look before thee, round thee, o’er thee -
Heaven invites thee - I am there! (Note: "Constantijntje, 't zaligh kijndtje, / Cherubijntje, van omhoogh,/ D'ydelheden, hier beneden, / Uitlacht met een lodderoogh. / Moeder, zeit hy, waarom schreit ghy? / Waarom greit ghy, op mijn lijck? / Boven leef ick, boven zweef ick, / Engeltje van 't hemelrijck: / En ick blinck 'er, en ick drincker, / 't Geen de schincker alles goets / Schenckt de zielen, die daar krielen, / Dertel van veel overvloeds. / Leer dan reizen met gepeizen / Naar pallaizen, uit het slik / Dezer werrelt, die zoo dwerrelt. / Eeuwigh gaat voor oogenblick.")

— Kinder-lijck (Child-like)

Not long after the death of Constantine, Vondel's 8-year-old daughter Saartje also died, in 1633 (about which he wrote a lament), and two years later another blow in his personal life occurred when his wife Mayken died in 1635. Meanwhile, at least five canto's of his epic Constantinade were finished, but for some reason Vondel stopped writing his great work and gradually lost interest in finishing it; possibly for lack of creative energy as a result from the losses he had to endure.

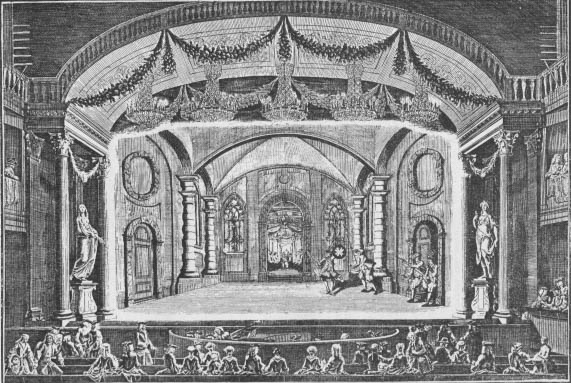
A performance of Gijsbrecht van Aemstel in the Stadsschouwburg.

A few years later more uplifting events occurred, when in 1637 the architect Jacob van Campen led the drastic renovation of the First Dutch Academy (where the most important plays in the city were performed), to replace the small wooden building for a stately stone building; the Theatre of Van Campen. Whether Vondel was asked to write a play for the opening of the newly build theatre, or whether he wrote the play on his own initiative, is not clear. What is clear, however, is that Vondel wrote the play Gijsbrecht van Aemstel rather quickly, so that by 1637, only six months after the start of the renovation, the play was ready to be performed at the opening of the Stadsschouwburg. The subject of Gijsbrecht van Aemstel was taken from the history of Amsterdam and involved the murder of Floris V, Count of Holland. Vondel encountered a history that involved the historical figure of Gijsbrecht IV of Amstel, who allegedly played a role in the assassination, and whose castle in Amsterdam was besieged as a revenge for his involvement. Vondel modelled the play after Virgil's Aeneid, where the siege of Troy and the subsequent sack of the city were used as parallels for contemporary Amsterdam. Although the play sparked a lot of controversy because of the Catholic imagery Vondel included, the highly dramatic play would eventually become one of his supreme achievements and would establish his reputation as a tragedian for centuries to come. Vondel dedicated Gijsbrecht van Aemstel to his friend Grotius, who, although he never saw a performance of it because of his exile, regarded this "beautifully embellished history" as "an immortal work".

In the period after the publication of Gijsbrecht van Aemstel, Vondel gradually began considering the genre of the play as more important than the epic, and as a result not only began writing more plays, but also started translating the plays from Ancient Greece (partly because of his growing fascination with the theatre of ancient Greece). Through his humanist friends he became acquainted with the Greek tragedies, and the first tragedy he translated was Electra by Sophocles. In the same year, in 1639, the play Maeghden (Maidens) was published; a dramatization of the history of Saint Ursula. More importantly, however, was the play Gebroeders (Brothers) in 1640, since it was the first of his tragedies to be written entirely after the Greek model, and moreover, it had success with both scholars and the general public.

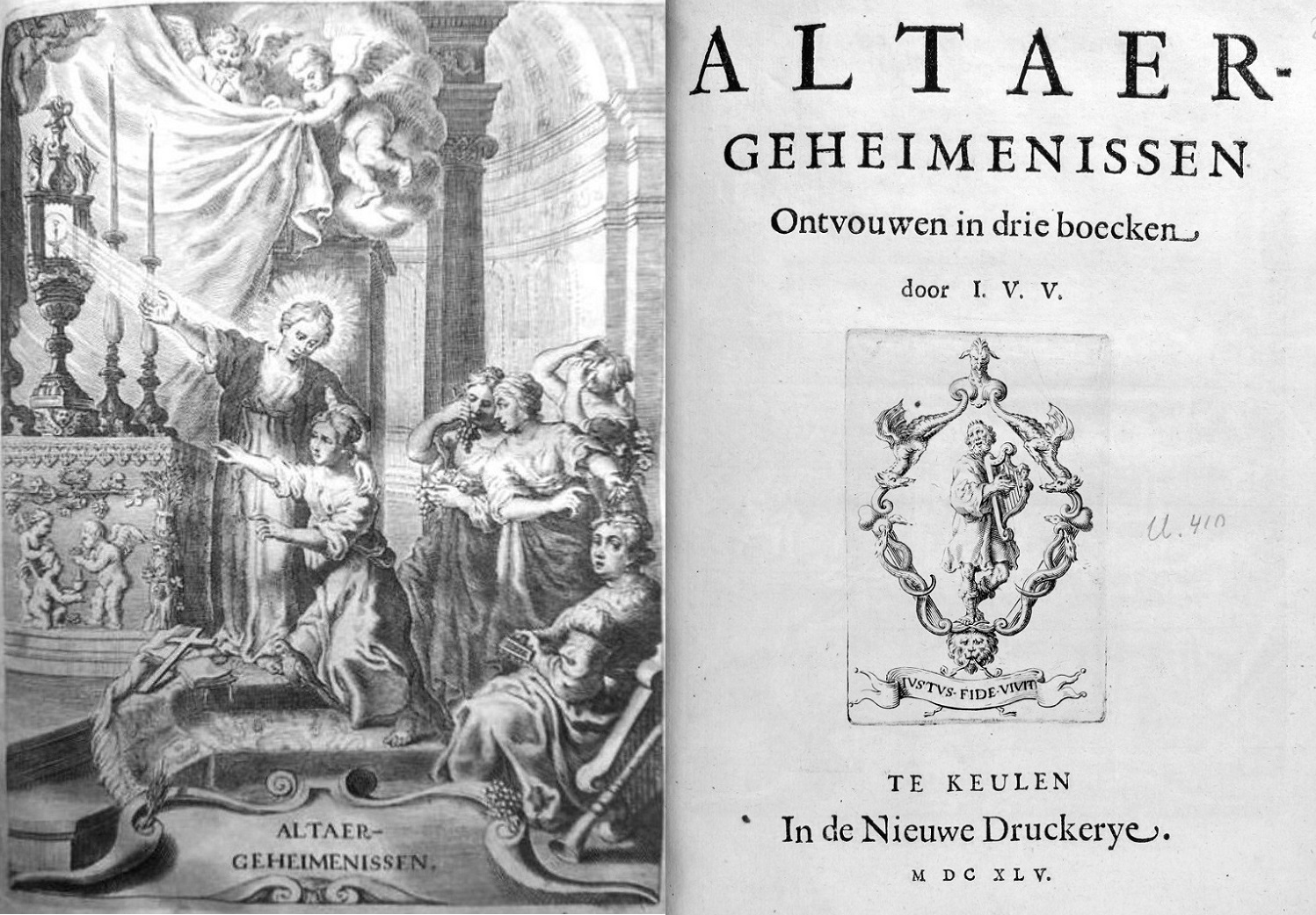
The frontispice of Vondel's Altaergeheimenissen; an ode to the Catholic faith.

Somewhere around 1641 one of the most significant events in Vondel's life occurred, namely his conversion to Catholicism. His conversion to Catholicism did not come entirely out of nowhere, since Vondel already showed sympathy for Catholicism by using Catholic imagery in plays such as Gijsbrecht van Aemstel and Maidens. Exactly when his conversion took place is not entirely clear, but most scholars agree that it must have been around 1641 (although Brandt and Jacob van Lennep date it between 1639 and 1640). Because Vondel never left a justification as to why he converted to Catholicism, it remains a guess what his motivations might have been. What helped was that his daughter Anna already converted to the Catholic faith and his friend Hugo Grotius earlier made pleas for a reconciliation between Christians and a return to the church of the first centuries AD. According to Smits-Veldt, Vondel apparently favored the idea of "a united community of believers for whom ecclesiastical authority was binding" over the internal struggles in for instance his own Mennonite community, where only the Bible can be a source of faith. His conversion in any case resulted in two important works that were directly related to his new faith. The first of which was the tragedy of 1646 Maria Stuart (Mary Stuart), in which the Catholic queen Mary was portrayed as an innocent victim of the bloodthirsty Elizabeth I. As with many of his previous plays, this play also had a strong political dimension and was very controversial. Firstly, it angered the Calvinists, who were abhorred by the glorification of Catholicism, and secondly, it offended the people who did not wish to see their one-time ally in the war against Spain, Elizabeth I, to be portrayed as a rebel. The second work of this period that dealt with his Catholic convictions is a long epic-didactic poem called Altaergeheimenissen (Secrets of the Altar, 1645), in which Vondel provides a plea in favor of the Sacraments of the Catholic Church. Although Vondel also defended his new faith in De heerlijkheid der kerke (On the Church), Altaergeheimenissen is one of the few instances in his oeuvre where he deals explicitly with his Catholic faith. In the centuries that followed Altaergeheimenissen eventually went on to be regarded as one of Vondel's most beautiful and important works.

=== Lucifer ===
One of the consequences of his conversion was that Vondel more or less alienated himself from several of his friends, such as P.C. Hooft, Barlaeus and Huygens. The matter of Vondel's conversion was considered to be especially inconvenient since he was generally regarded as the greatest living poet of the Dutch Republic. As a gesture of reconciliation Vondel dedicated several works to his friends, for example his prose translations of the three great works by Virgil, the Georgics, the Eclogues and the Aeneid, were dedicated to P.C. Hooft. Meanwhile, the Eighty Years' War, of which the events had such a big impact on Vondel's life, came to an end with the Treaty of Munster. To celebrate this important event he decided to write a pastoral inspired by Giovanni Battista Guarini's work Il Pastor Fido and Virgil's Georgics, but also with the latest theoretical insights as formulated by Vossius in his recently published Institutiones poeticae (Institutes of Poetics) with regard to its structure; this work became Leeuwendalers (Lion Fallers), his only pastoral play.

Vondel's understanding of Vossius's Institutiones poeticae, a compilation of everything that was known at the time about ancient poetics (but the work also covered principles regarding the composition of music and drama), was important for the dramatic development of his future tragedies. The first of these tragedies, Salomon, was written around the same time as Leeuwendalers and was published in 1648. In the play Vondel demonstrated his deepened knowledge of the principles of the Ancient Greek drama, largely because of his careful study of the notions that were theorized by Aristotle in his Poetics. Of particular importance in this light was his admission that he previously violated the Aristotelian requirement that if an action was to arouse "terror and empathy", the protagonist should be neither entirely good nor entirely bad; this demand was to be of seminal importance for his future plays, in particular for his tragedy Lucifer of 1654.

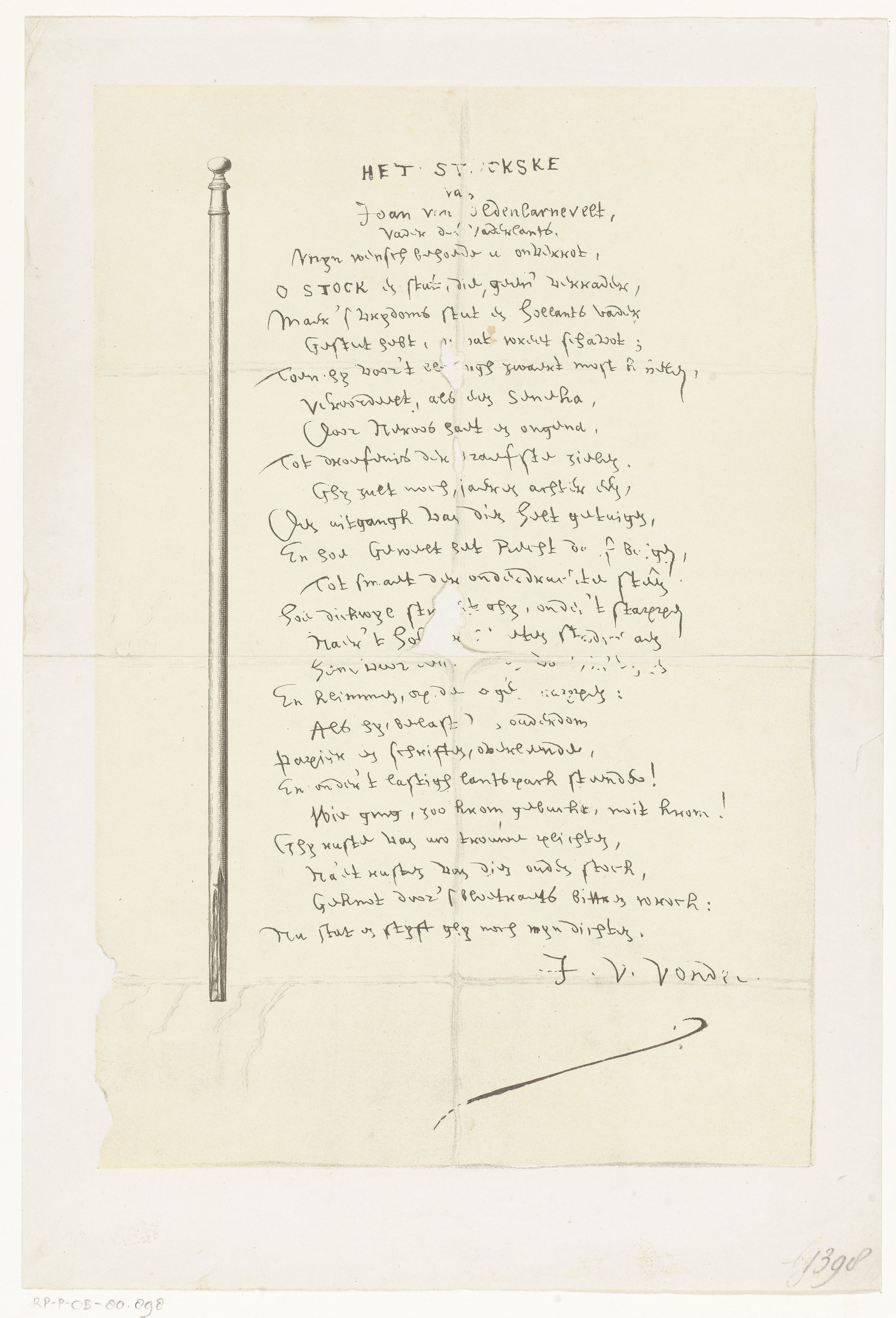
The poem Het stockske van Oldenbarneveldt (The Cane of Oldenbarnevelt), written by the poet himself

Around this time several of his long-time friends died; first Grotius succumbed to a shipwreck in 1645, then Hooft died in 1647, followed by the suicide of Barlaeus in 1648 and eventually the death of Vossius in 1649. Vondel continued to write occasional poetry, for instance the elegy on the death of his friend Vossius. The highlights of his poetry of this time are two occasional poems in particular, the first is his long ode to the construction of the Royal Palace of Amsterdam (at the time the new city hall) called Inwydinge van 't stadhuis t’Amsterdam (Inauguration of the Amsterdam Town Hall); this work has been called "the most beautiful ode to Amsterdam ever written". The second noteworthy poem is, together with Kinder-lijck, arguably his most famous poem, Het stockske van Oldenbarneveldt (The Cane of Oldenbarnevelt, referring to the cane with which Oldenbarnevelt was said to have walked to the scaffold) of 1657. Almost 40 years after the execution of Van Oldenbarnevelt, Vondel apparently was still preoccupied with what happened; which shows how great the impact of the event must have been. One of the most glorious moments in his professional life occurred in 1653, when, aged sixty-five, he was crowned with a laurel wreath at the festival of St. Lucas by some hundred poets, painters and lovers of art, to honor him in recognition of his uncontested mastery of the art of poetry.

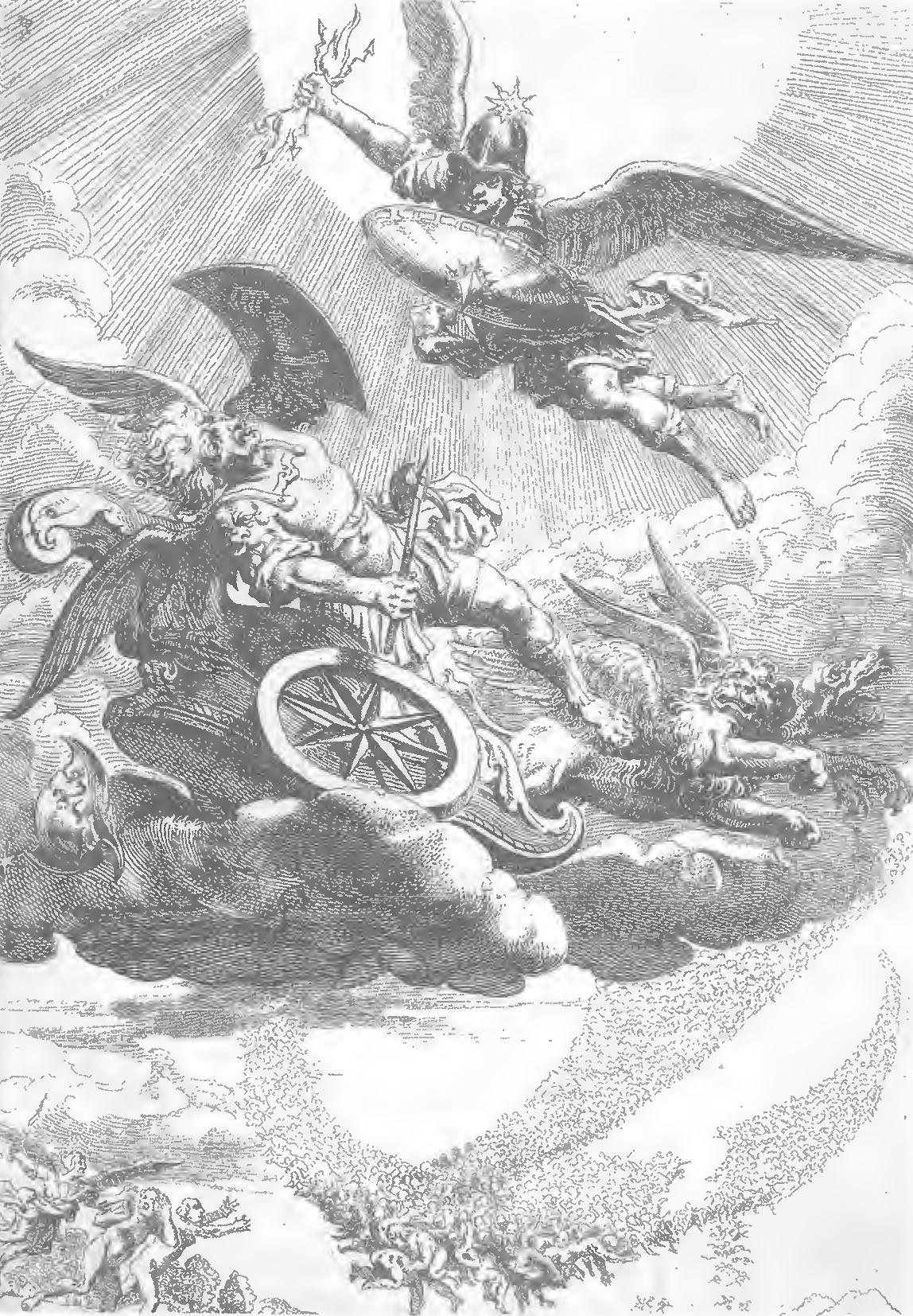
An engraving in the first edition of Vondel's masterpiece Lucifer, depicting Lucifer's removal from heaven by archangel Michael's bolt of lightning

The apotheosis of what Vondel achieved as a playwright occurred one year later with the publication of what many would call his absolute masterpiece, Lucifer (1654). In Lucifer Vondel not only achieves what has been called "a triumph of the poetic imagination", but also a dramatic effect that is the result of characters who are at the height of their powers, but have conflicting aspirations, so that their relationships are leading to the greatest tensions. For this reason this work has been called "Vondel's Baroque piece par excellence", since the greatest contrasts and conflicts - typical for the Baroque - are the subject matter of the work. The play, which is in essence the primordial conflict between good and evil, is about the rebellion against God and the two consequences it had, namely the Fall of the Angels and the Fall of Man. Although the play is about the battle between good and evil, one of the most acclaimed aspects of the work is the fact that its characters, especially Lucifer, are much more complex and do not act either entirely good or evil. In February 1654, the authorities unexpectedly removed the performance of Lucifer from the repertoire; this time the controversy was apparently not of a political nature, as with Palamedes, or because the play included Catholic imagery (the Catholic elements in Lucifer were absent), but simply because of the sacrilegious aspect of "showing the high matter of the depths of God".

=== Later years and death ===
With the completion of Lucifer, Vondel was at the peak of his artistic powers. Meanwhile, in his private life the business of selling silk that was started by his father, was handed over to his son Joost Jr. in 1652. In the same year the First Anglo-Dutch War (1652–54) broke out and caused great poverty in Amsterdam; as a result Joost Jr. went bankrupt and his father had to take over his debts. Vondel then was given a job as bookkeeper at the municipal pawnbroking bank, which provided him with an above-average income, until he turned 80 and was dismissed with the retention of his salary. In the meantime - as a result of his debts - Vondel's son Joost went to the East Indies in 1659 and died on the outward journey; along with the death of his wife Mayken, this was certainly his biggest personal tragedy. It has been said that all the plays Vondel wrote in the early 1660s - many of which are in-depth explorations of the father-son relationship - are really about sorrow over the loss of his son.

In the same year Joost jr. died, he published his play Jephta (Jephthah) in which he explored the principles of the Aristotelian tragedy that he encountered in Vossius' work even further. The play, based on a work by the Scottish humanist George Buchanan, is especially notable for conforming even more to the Aristotelian tragedy; he even went so far as to make of it "a model tragedy". This is for instance visible in the protagonist of the piece, Jephta, who is neither completely good, nor completely bad. For many Jephta is considered to be one of the highlights of Vondel's dramatic work. Even though the three tragedies he wrote after Jephta all deal with father-son relationships, the central subject of Koning David in ballingschap (King David Exiled), Koning David herstelt (King David Restored) and Samson (all published in 1660) is really that of a change of state (staetveranderinghe), a subject that is already present in his Jephta with its reversal of fortune from happiness to sadness. Three years later Vondel interrupted his plays based on biblical themes and wrote two plays - both dealing with the themes of guilt, justice and punishment - that were based on secular stories; the first play, Batavische gebroeders, used an episode from the revolt of the Batavians against Rome as told by Tacitus, and the second, Faëton, used the mythological story about the son of Apollo from the Metamorphoses.

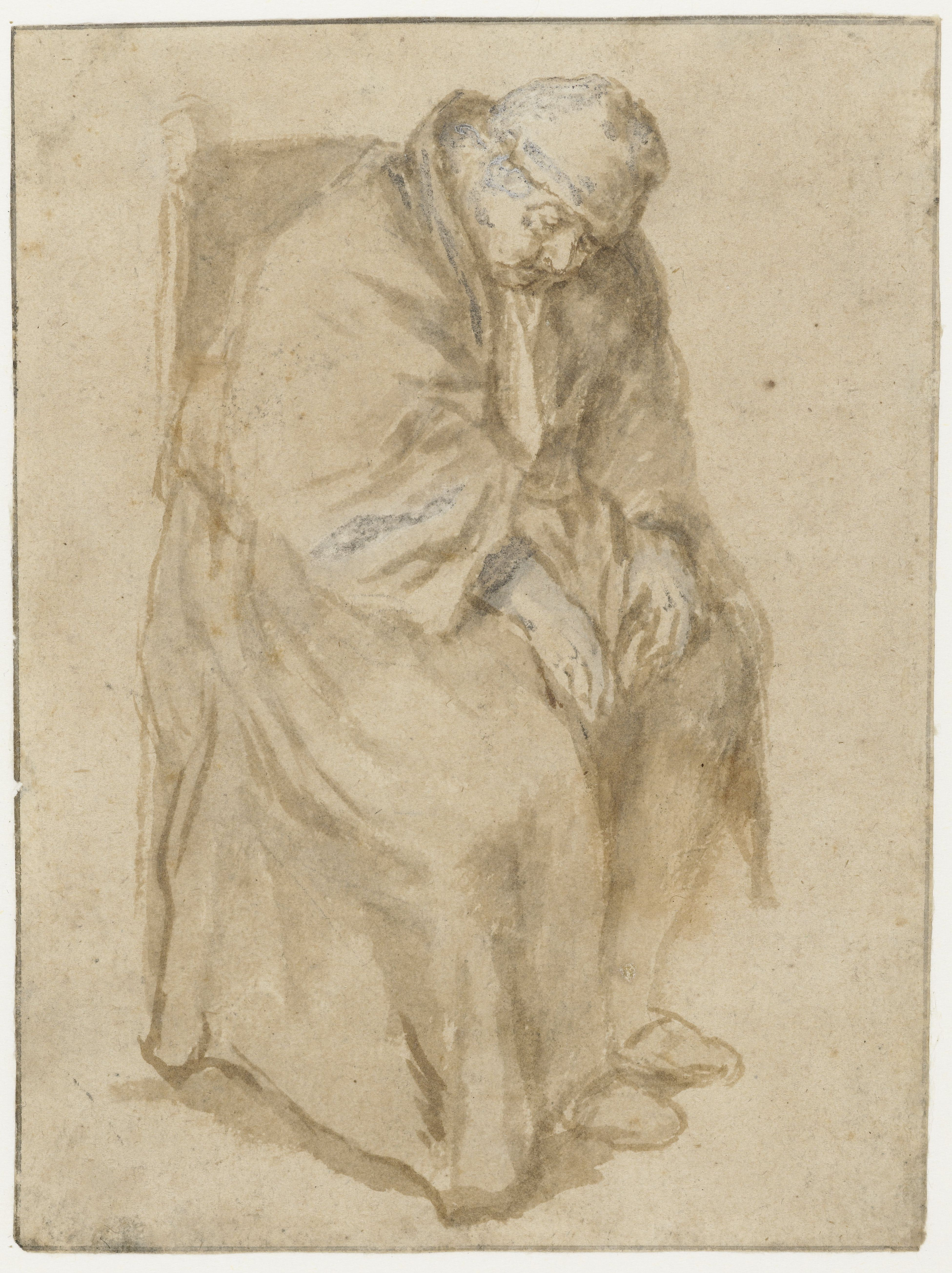
A drawing of Vondel, aged 91, whilst sleeping in his chair, by Philips Koninck

A year earlier, in 1662, Vondel produced what has been called "the greatest Dutch epic", Joannes de Boetgezant, about the life of John the Baptist. Whereas Vondel's previous attempt, with Constantinade, at writing an epic was abandoned for unknown reasons, Joannes de Boetgezant became the first successful biblical epic of the Dutch Republic. Vondel's model departed from the Virgilian-Tassonian model with regard to its didactic bias, but retained the characteristic motif of the epic since Tasso of the duality between good and evil. Joannes de Boetgezant would become a model for heroic poems in the 18th century. The motif of good versus evil that pervaded Joannes de Boetgezant became a central theme in his final three plays Adam in ballingschap (Adam Exiled) of 1664, and Zungchin and Noach, both published in 1667. Especially the publication of Adam in ballingschap and Noach are significant for the completion of the trilogy that Vondel intended with Lucifer. At the same time, Adam in ballingschap and Noach are also considered to be two of the most "characteristic and admirable highlights of Vondel's imagination." With his last three plays, Vondel tried to harmonize the duality of good and evil with that of the change of state theme, to achieve a synthesis of all of his work from the previous two decades.

From the publication of Noach onwards, which was completed when he was 80 years old, Vondel no longer wrote long poems. Because of his old age, his daughter Anna had moved in with her father to take care of him. As a result of an outbreak of the plague in Amsterdam in 1664 (which cost the lives of 24000 people; 10% of the population), his grandson Adriaan died in 1664 and not much later also his granddaughter Maria. Although Vondel's family lived relatively prosperous, partly because of an inheritance they received from one of the widows of Joost jr., disaster struck the family once more when also Vondel's grandson Willem died in 1670 and not much later his daughter Anna in 1675. As a result, Vondel's only remaining grandchild Justus and his wife moved in with him. In the meantime the Third Anglo-Dutch War broke out, along with the Rampjaar in 1672; events that were particularly devastating for Vondel, because Johan de Witt, who was greatly admired by him for defending the policy of toleration, was murdered by an angry mob. About this tragedy Vondel wrote a short poem. At the end of his life Vondel was occasionally visited by friends, such as his first biographer Gerard Brandt and the painter Philips Koninck, who made several drawings and paintings of Vondel. On 5 February 1679 Vondel died at the age of 91.

== Works ==
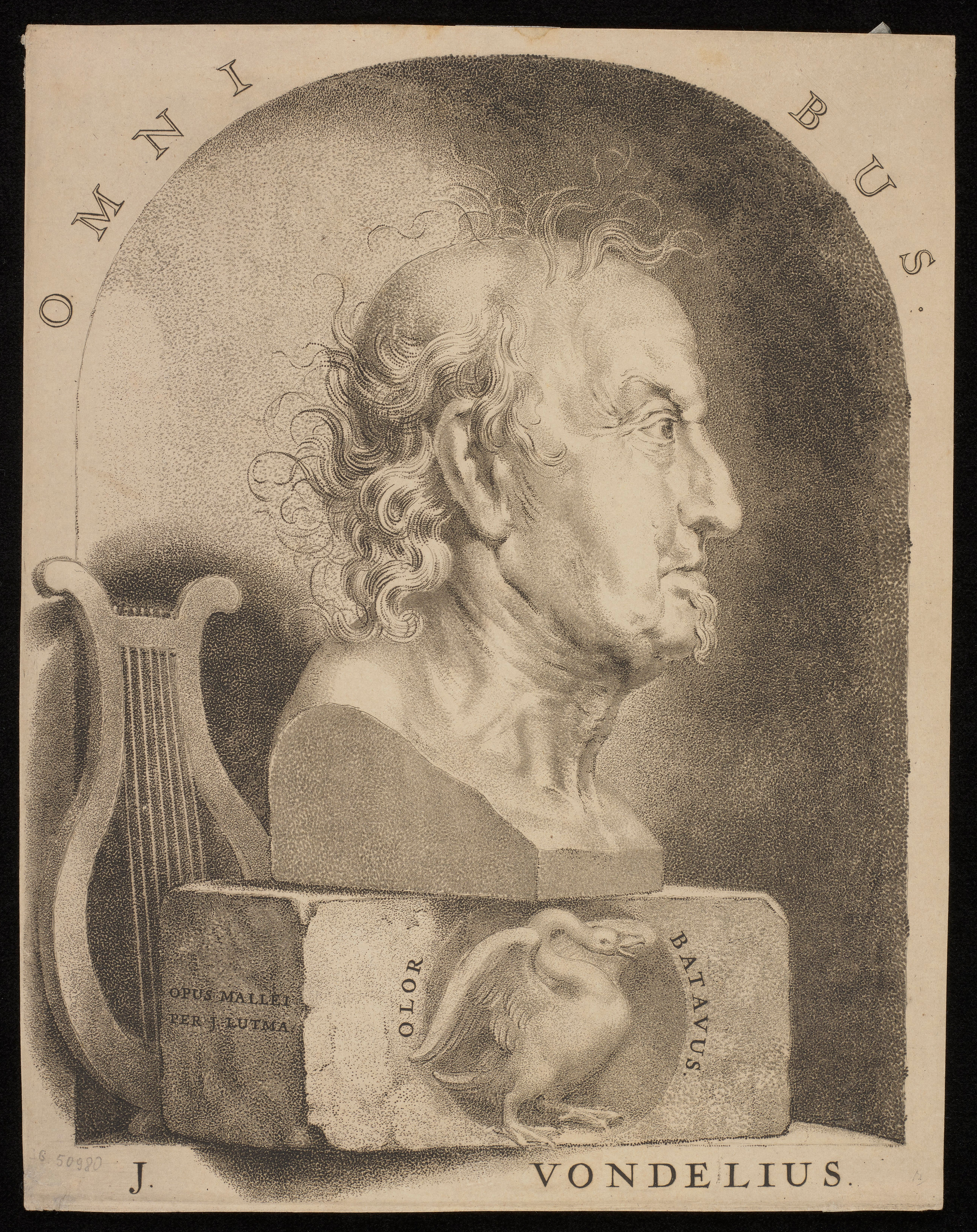
An engraving for a publication of the works of Vondel, by Johannes Lutma

In his lifetime, Vondel produced a considerable amount of literary works in a great variety of different genre's and different forms. He wrote thirty-three plays, hundreds of poems - consisting of occasional poetry, satires, odes, sonnets and didactic poems - an epic and numerous translations of Classical and contemporary literature. His work is considered by many to be remarkable for its virtuosity, especially with regard to his use of language and verse. In his work, especially in his dramatic output, Vondel is rarely lighthearted; his work is generally concerned with the great questions of human history, for example how state and law function, the essence of good and evil, matters relating to guilt and punishment, and especially how mankind relates to God. In that light it can be said, that mankind's lack of certainty and freedom of the will are two important motifs in Vondel's dramatic work. What applies to his dramatic work, can also be said about his poetry: Vondel writes mostly about the general essences of things, even when he writes for specific occasions, Vondel generally tends to transcend the matter to a more abstracted level of truths and values; his own feelings and sentiments are in that respect not his primary concern. Vondel's main objective in writing dramas for instance, is not so much entertainment, but the increasing of competence, as the theatre was for him especially a means that could be used to elevate the spectator; it had the function of conveying knowledge.

Regardless of the abstraction in his work, Vondel was also a deeply engaged writer, it has been said that "everything that was to be seen in the world of his time, lives in his work, in some way or another". It is with his literary work that Vondel took part in the great debates of his time, for instance the theological-political struggle between the Remonstrants and Contra-Remonstrants, the trial of Johan van Oldenbarnevelt, the politics of toleration or the occasional poetry for regents and stadtholders. The sources Vondel drew upon for his works were generally the poets and playwrights from the classical period; according to W.A.P. Smit his most important literary influences were Du Bartas, Seneca, Virgil, Grotius, Vossius, Sophocles, Euripides and Tasso. Indeed, Vondel was highly influenced by the playwrights of Ancient Greece, but at the same time he tried to use their own concept of emulation (aemulatio) to not only imitate their work, but also improve on it. Besides his indebtedness to classical literature, his work is at the same time deeply rooted in Christian philosophy and the humanism as encountered in the works of Erasmus; especially with an adherence to a form of religious toleration.

=== Plays ===
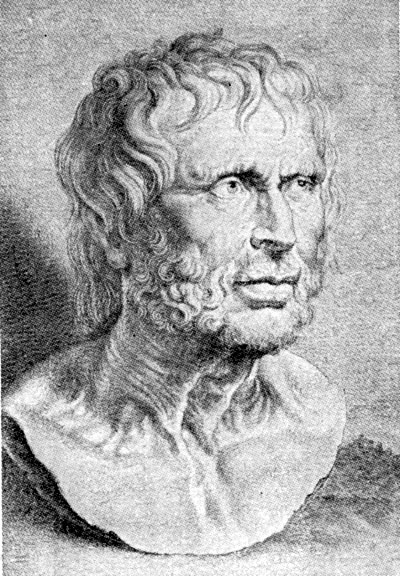
A drawing of Seneca, who was an important influence on Vondel's early work, by Peter Paul Rubens

Although Vondel produced thirty-three plays in his life, eight of his plays were translations of mainly classical works. Almost all of his plays are tragedies, with the exception of Leeuwendalers, which is a pastoral work and Het Pascha, which is a tragicomedy. Vondel's development as a playwright was largely subject to his reading and translations of works on Ancient Greek theatre and the poetics of Seneca and Aristotle in particular. According to the literary historian W.A.P. Smit, four turning points in the oeuvre of Vondel can be made, which makes it possible to divide his dramatic output in five periods. The first period covers the years between 1610 and 1620; when in 1612 Vondel wrote his first play Het Pascha, and eight years later, in 1620, Hierusalem verwoest. This period is characterized by a highly symbolic style of which especially Hierusalem verwoest is very much indebted to Seneca's work. The second period covers the years after 1620 until 1640 and has to be seen against the backdrop of Vondel's acquaintance with P.C. Hooft, Laurens Reael and other members of the Muiderkring on the one hand, and his acquaintance with the works of Virgil, Seneca and Tasso on the other. This period produced the play Amsteldamsche Hecuba (1626), but more significant is his highly dramatic work Palamedes from 1625, in which Vondel used the mythology of the eponymous Greek hero to function as an allegory for the execution of Johan van Oldenbarnevelt, whilst at the same time taking side in the religious-political debate that dominated the Dutch Republic at the time. The second great work of this period is his tragedy set in medieval Holland Gijsbrecht van Aemstel, about the siege and the subsequent sack of Amsterdam. This play, written for the opening of the new Theatre of Van Campen, is probably his most famous and frequently performed play. The last play of this period is the work Maeghden (Maidens), about the legend of Saint Ursula, in which Vondel showed a new affinity with the Ancient Greek drama.

The third period, from 1640 until 1648, starts with the play Gebroeders (Brothers) about the moral struggle of King David, who is forced by the command of God to execute seven descendants of Saul. Vondel's translation of Sophocles' Elektra was according to W.A.P. Smit a vital impulse for the start of this period, because of the Sophoclean emphasis of the emotional effect that the struggles in the protagonist could have on the inner self. In the same year Vondel wrote two plays about Joseph, Joseph in Dothan and Joseph in Egypten, that completed a trilogy with his earlier translated work by Hugo Grotius Sophompaneas. These plays, along with Gijsbrecht van Aemstel proved to be highly popular and were the peak of his success at the theatre of Amsterdam. A year later, in 1641, Vondel published his play Peter en Pauwels, a Roman Catholic drama about the martyrdom of Saint Peter and Saint Paul; a play that was far less popular than his previous ones. In 1646, Vondel produced a second play influenced by Catholicism, Maria Stuart, this time about the execution of the Scottish queen Mary Stuart. The last play that marked this period is Vondel's only pastoral play Leeuwendalers (Lion Fallers), a celebration piece for the end of the Eighty Years' War, in which peasants and hunters from North and South finally end their longstanding conflict.

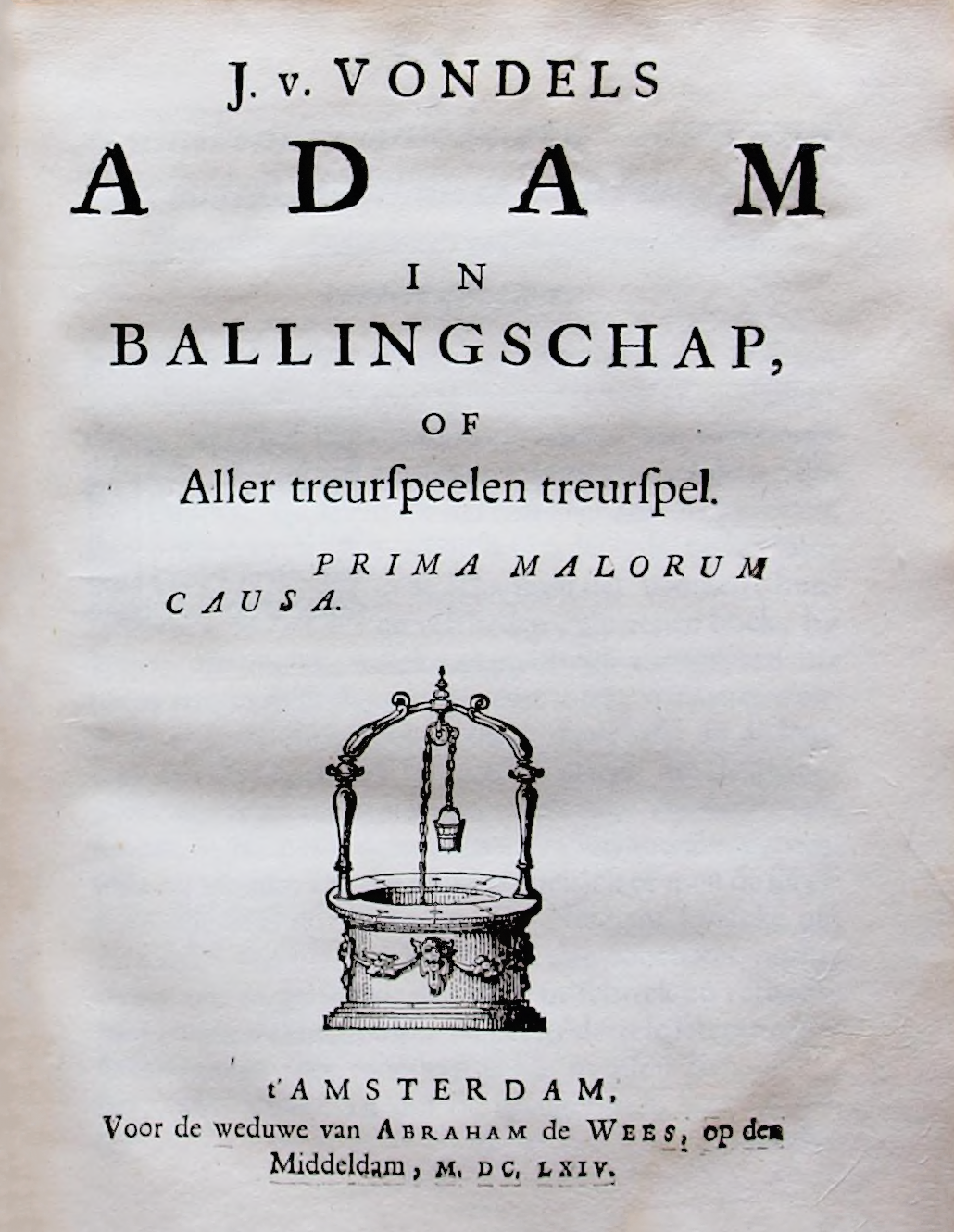
The frontcover of the "tragedy of all tragedies" Adam in Ballingschap; one of Vondel's greatest works

The beginning of the fourth period of Vondel's dramatic work is marked by the influence that Gerardus Vossius and especially Vossius' translations of the poetics of Aristotle had on Vondel. The period starts in 1648 with the work Salomon; a highly popular tragedy about the downfall of King Salomon. This period produced some of the greatest works Vondel has written, especially the publication of what many would call his masterpiece Lucifer, which deals with the rebellion of Lucifer against God and the subsequent Fall of the Angels and the Fall of Man. But also Jephta, a play about the sacrifice of Jephthah's daughter to God, is regarded as one of Vondel's finest works and "a pinnacle of his dramatic art". Another play that Vondel produced in this period is Salmoneus about the wicked King of Eleia who wants to be worshipped as Zeus. The fifth period W.A.P. Smit discerns, is the last period in the development of Vondel's dramatic work. According to Smit it begins in 1660, and once again with a translation of a work by Sophocles; this time Oedipus Rex. This period covers, with nine plays by far the most productive period in Vondel's career, and is dominated by Vondel's choice of centralizing the insight of Sophocles of a change of state (staetveranderinghe) in the protagonist. His first two plays of this period are Koning David in ballingschap (King David Exiled) and Koning David herstelt (King David Restored) and deal with King David's conflict with his son Absalom; both plays are regarded as two of the highlights of this period. In 1661 the play Samson was published, about Samson's humiliation and revenge. And one year later the play Adonias which tells the story of Adonijah and his attempt to get rid of his younger brother Salomon. The play Batavische gebroeders (Batavian Brothers) is an exception with regard to its secular subject: the revolt of Gaius Julius Civilis and his brother against the Roman Empire. In the same year, 1663, Vondel wrote the tragedy Faëton about the hubris of the son of the sun god Helios. The tragedy Adam in ballingschap (Adam in exile) that Vondel wrote in 1664, which tells the story of the fall of Adam and Eve, is today considered as one of the absolute highlights of Vondel's oeuvre. Three years later, in 1667, Vondel published his last two plays. The first Zunghchin (Chongzhen), deals with the end of the Ming dynasty in 1644, when the Chongzhen Emperor took his own life. Vondel's acclaimed swan song is the tragedy Noach, which not only completed the trilogy he intended to make with Lucifer and Adam in ballingschap, but can also be seen as a synthesis of everything he made before; W.A.P. Smit refers to it as "not only Vondel's last tragedy, but also his most surprising one".

=== Poems ===
Although as a playwright, Vondel worked in primarily one specific genre; the tragedy, as a poet he covered almost every poetic genre: odes, elegies, satires, occasional poetry, paeans, obituary poetry, hymns and sonnets. Vondel's work as a poet has to be seen in the context of the tradition of the Chamber of rhetoric, which were literary societies that originated in the Southern Netherlands in the 15th century, but spread to the Northern provinces, where members studied and composed poetry together especially for specific occasions. From 1606, if not earlier, Vondel was a member of t Wit Lavendel (The White Lavender). Many of his poems were written for specific occasions and are therefore occasional poetry, but at the same time, the occasional poems were sometimes written as e.g. hymns, or sometimes as e.g. funerary poetry; and are therefore overlapping in terms of genre. The characteristics that apply to Vondel's plays, can to a certain extent also be applied to Vondel's poetry. Like many of his plays, Vondel used his poems to comment on political, religious and cultural matters. And just like in his plays, Vondel aims to elevate the reader of his poetry and at the same time to propagate a certain point of view (often of a moralistic and didactic nature) on an abstract level of truths and values. The model Vondel used for his poems is derived from classical literature. But whereas his plays are modelled on the Ancient Greek playwrights and the poetics of Aristotle, his poetry is more indebted to Virgil, Ovid and especially Horace (i.e. his poetry, but also his theoretical work Ars Poetica). Apart from the influences of Latin literature, the works of the French poet Guillaume de Salluste Du Bartas were also an important influence.

But what is in my heart
Wells up towards my lips; the inward pressure grows:
Fermenting like new wine, it bursts and overflows. (Note: "Maar wat op 's harten grond leit / Dat welt mij naar de keel; / ik word te stijf geparst / En 't werkt als nieuwe wijn, die bij de spon uitbarst.")

— Roskam, Curry-comb (64-66)

An acclaimed and controversial aspect of Vondel's poetic oeuvre is without question his satires ('hekeldichten'). Most of the satires Vondel wrote were written in the early period of his life, until 1654, whilst later in his life he generally seemed to have lost interest in commenting on political struggles and was more preoccupied with religious matters and his dramatic work. The highlight of Vondel's satires are represented by two large poems published in 1630, the first of which Roskam (Curry-comb) is a denunciation of the selfishness and greed of the regents, whilst the second, Harpoen (Harpoon), is a satire in which Vondel attacks the intolerance of preachers. The "brutal ferocity of his satirical verse" was - just like many of his plays - highly controversial at the time and this prevented his satires from being published even thirty years later. In the years 1625 until 1632, Vondel wrote most of his satires, around 32 in total, with great variety in tone and subject matter. The execution of Johan van Oldenbarnevelt was a subject that was clearly important to Vondel, as can be seen in the satire ‘’Geuze-vesper’’ (Beggar's Vespers), which hits out at Van Oldenbarnevelt's judges. With his satires, Vondel took part in the political debates of his time, and, as he himself wrote in Roskam, couldn't remain silent to what he considered in his heart to be injustice.

Apart from the satires, Vondel's odes are another important aspect of his poetry. His ode's were written to a large extent as occasional poetry, for instance for the occasion of the opening of buildings, such as the poem Inwying van den Christen tempel t’Amsterdam (Consecration of the Christian Temple of Amsterdam) for the inauguration of the first Remonstrant church building in Amsterdam, in 1630. Another notable example is the Inwydinge van 't stadhuis t’Amsterdam (Inauguration of the Amsterdam Town Hall), which has been called "the most beautiful ode to Amsterdam ever written". In his Aan de beurs van Amsterdam (To the Commodity Exchange of Amsterdam), he praised the architecture of Hendrick de Keyser, but also emphasized the unreliability of fortune and the volatility of fate; an abstraction to universal values that was a common technique in Vondel's poetry. Apart from the many ode's on buildings, Vondel also wrote ode's to a great variety of different subjects; an example of this is his great poem Lof der Zeevaert (In Praise of Seafaring) of 1623, which celebrates overseas trade. Other examples are a large number of ode's to different people, such as his ode for Erasmus, an ode to Michiel de Ruyter or his Zegezang ter eeren van Fredrik Hendrik prince van Oranje; an ode to Frederick Henry, Prince of Orange.

Blest is the mind that, fix'd and free,
To wanton pleasures scorns to yield,
And wards, as with a pliant shield,
The arrows of adversity. (Note: "Gelukkig is een vast gemoed / dat in geen blijde weelde smilt / en stuit, gelijk een taaie schild, / den onvermijdb're tegenspoed.")

— Vertroostinge aan Geeraerdt Vossivs, Consolation to Geraerdt Vossius (29-32)

Two other important aspects of his poetic output are his obituary poems (or elegies) and his religious poems. Throughout his life, Vondel wrote poems to commemorate or lament the loss of people who were either close to him or close to his friends. Two of the most famous examples of this kind of poetry are the poems Kinder-lijck (meaning both Child-like and Child's corpse) and Uitvaart van mijn dochtertje (Funeral of my little daughter), that Vondel wrote for the loss of his son Constantijn (in 1632) and for the loss of his daughter Saartje (in 1633). But Vondel also wrote similar poetry for others, for instance his Vertroostinge aan Geeraerdt Vossivs (Consolation to Geeraerdt Vossius) for his friend Gerard Vossius who lost his son Dionys. Many of these poems have a similar tendency in that they relate the consolation somehow to a kind of Christian-stoic attitude, an example of this can be found in the last stanza of Vondel's consolation to Vossius. Apart from his obituary poetry, of which many have a thematic nature that is deeply Christian, Vondel also wrote poetry to account for his religious convictions. Two poems in particular stand out, first his Altaergeheimenissen (Secrets of the Altar) of 1645, about the Sacraments of the Catholic Church, and secondly De heerlijkheid der kerke ("On the Church") which deals with Vondel's vision of the history Catholic Church; i.e. the origin of the church and its contemporary place in the world.

== Style ==
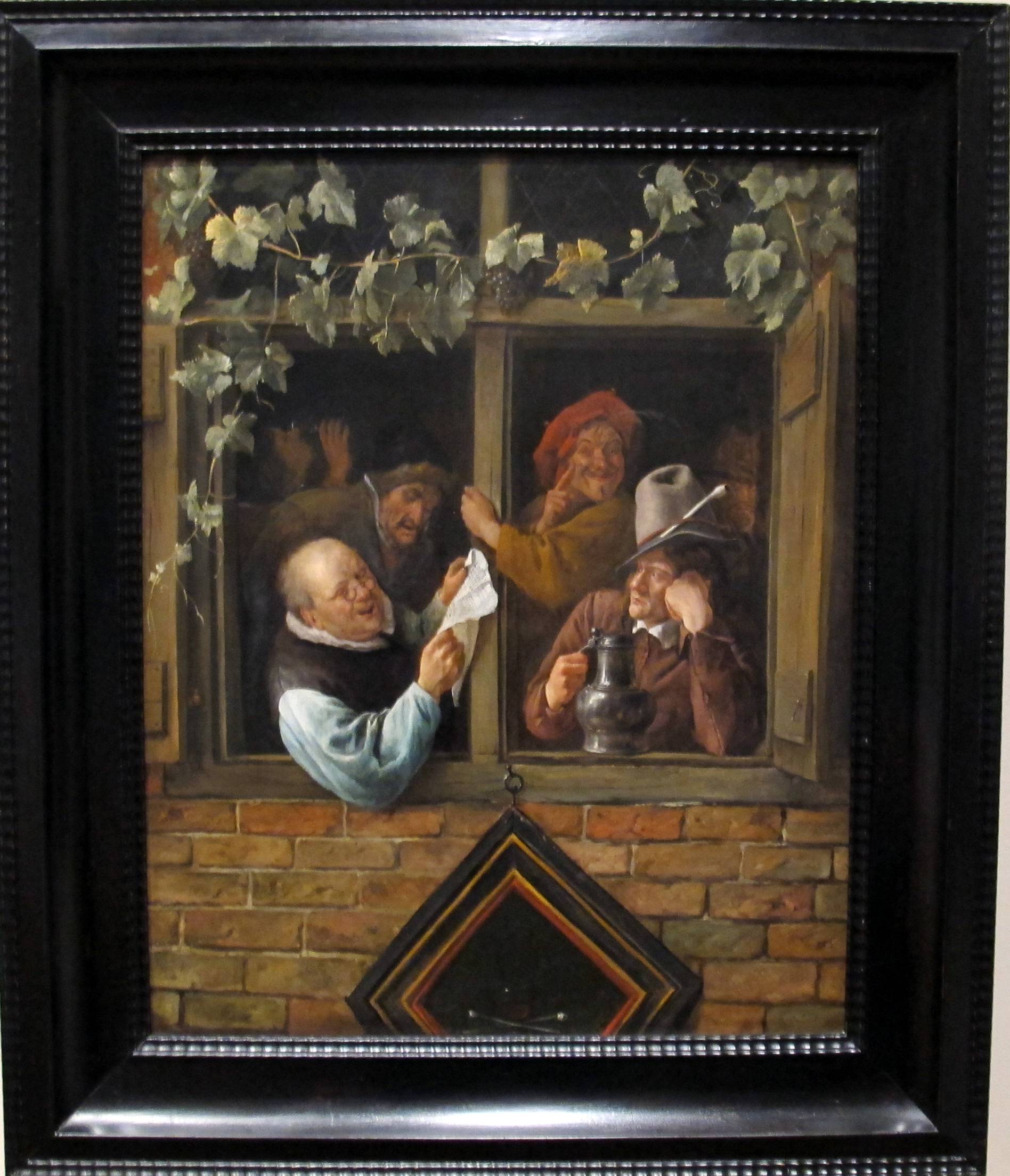
A painting by Jan Steen, depicting a group of members of a Chamber of rhetoric, an important influence on Vondel's poetic style

Vondel's style is influenced by the cultural-historical environment to which he was subject; in that light the lyrical poetry of the Chamber of rhetoric was vital for his poetry throughout his career, but also the characteristics of the Baroque is essential to explain his style. The poetry of the Chamber of rhetoric is characterized by an emphasize on technical poetry, with lots of rhyme (end rhyme as well as internal rhyme) and lots of embellishment with e.g. exotic words, alliteration and onomatopoeia. The characteristics of the baroque can be discerned in both the poetic and dramatic works of Vondel, for instance in his Lucifer the typical aspects of the Baroque are present with the emphasis on the colossal and the overwhelming. But also with regard to the use of language his style is typically baroque: lots of rhetoric, lots of antithesis (which enhances the drama), and the language is usually sensitive and sensual with regard to the use of metaphors. The abundance of language, with its rich imagery, extended comparisons, sound effects and "the majestic rhythm of his alexandrines" can therefore be explained through Vondel being a writer of the Baroque, but also through his connection with the Chamber of rhetoric. Vondel's dramatic works, but also many of his poems, are generally written by employing alexandrines (i.e. iambic hexameters with masculine and feminine endings). But there are exceptions, for instance his tragedy Jephta and the chori of his plays, deviate from the standard practice of using alexandrines. The style of his verses is furthermore characterized by a great virtuosity in terms of rhyme and rhythm; in that light, it has been argued that "Vondel was a language virtuoso; more than that, he was a builder of language".

The nature of his work is to a certain extent directly connected to his style. It can be said that his work, especially his dramatic work, can best be understood as symbolic, rather than psychological; in the sense that Vondel strives to use the characters of his plays as symbolic for mankind in general. The drama in Vondel's tragedies for instance are drama's of idea's, in particular idea's that are related to religious matters. For this reason, the individual characterization and development of the inner life of the characters of his play is only given to a certain extent; the real drama that rages in the protagonists's mind is achieved with Vondel's poetry. His poetry is therefore a crucial element of his dramatic work, since style is being employed to create the tension of his work and the conflicts with which his characters are confronted. In this sense, it can be said that there is a preference in Vondel's style to narrate the developments of the play, rather than the usage of overflowing personal emotions; as a result his drama's have a clear epic style.

== Legacy ==
=== Influence ===
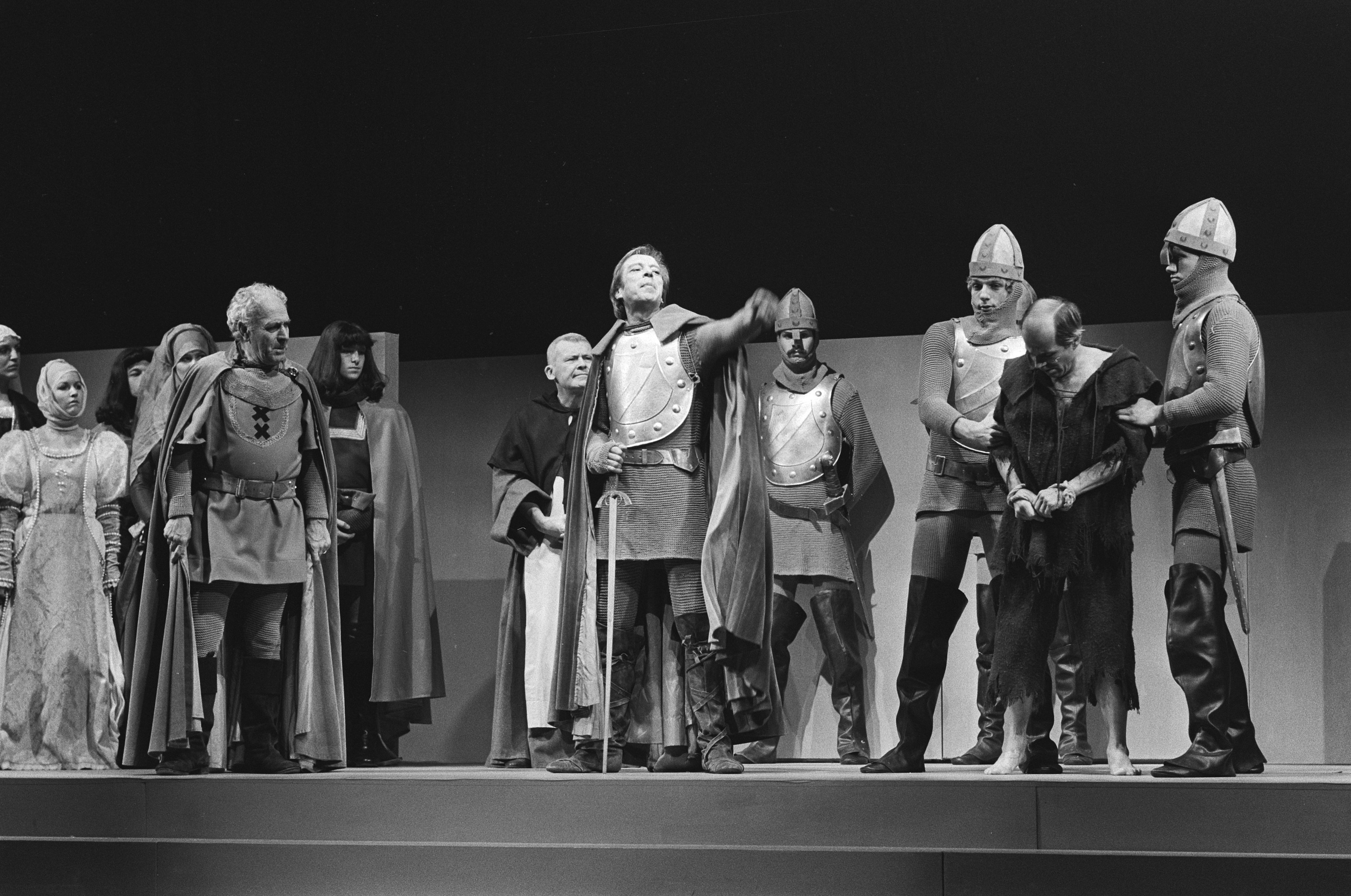
A New Year's Eve performance in the Stadsschouwburg of Gijsbrecht van Aemstel; a tradition that lasted for centuries

Vondel's work had an enormous impact on Dutch literature. It has been argued that even in the late nineteenth century, Dutch poetry was still colored by Vondel's language. Vondel's plays continued to be read and performed after his death, although certainly not all of his plays continued to be performed. Gijsbrecht van Aemstel however did, as it was performed annually on New Year's Day and the days that followed. During the 18th century, although the dominant style switched to French classicism, Vondel's work continued to be admired, for instance by Balthasar Huydecoper, as representing the "language of the Parnassus”. Although his work was less acclaimed in comparison to the previous century, he was still a source of inspiration for 18th century writers such as Johannes le Francq van Berkhey. The same goes for the work of Lucretia van Merken, one of the most important Dutch poets and playwrights of the 18th century, who was profoundly influenced by Vondel's writings and modeled her plays after his work. Another example is Willem Bilderdijk, the most important figure of 18th and 19th century Dutch literature, who explicitly called Vondel his master and his example. In the 19th century, partly because of the influence of Romanticism, with the emphasis on poetic originality and genius, Vondel's work was more appreciated. Two authors of the 19th century were important in giving his work renewed attention. The first was Jacob van Lennep, who was vital in arranging and editing his complete works and eventually established Vondel's reputation as the national poet of The Netherlands. The second was Joseph Albert Alberdingk Thijm, who championed his work and at the same time emphasized his Catholicism. Moreover, some of the most important literary figures of the 19th and early 20th century were distinctly influenced by Vondel's work, examples are Guido Gezelle, Hendrik Tollens, Albert Verwey and Herman Gorter.

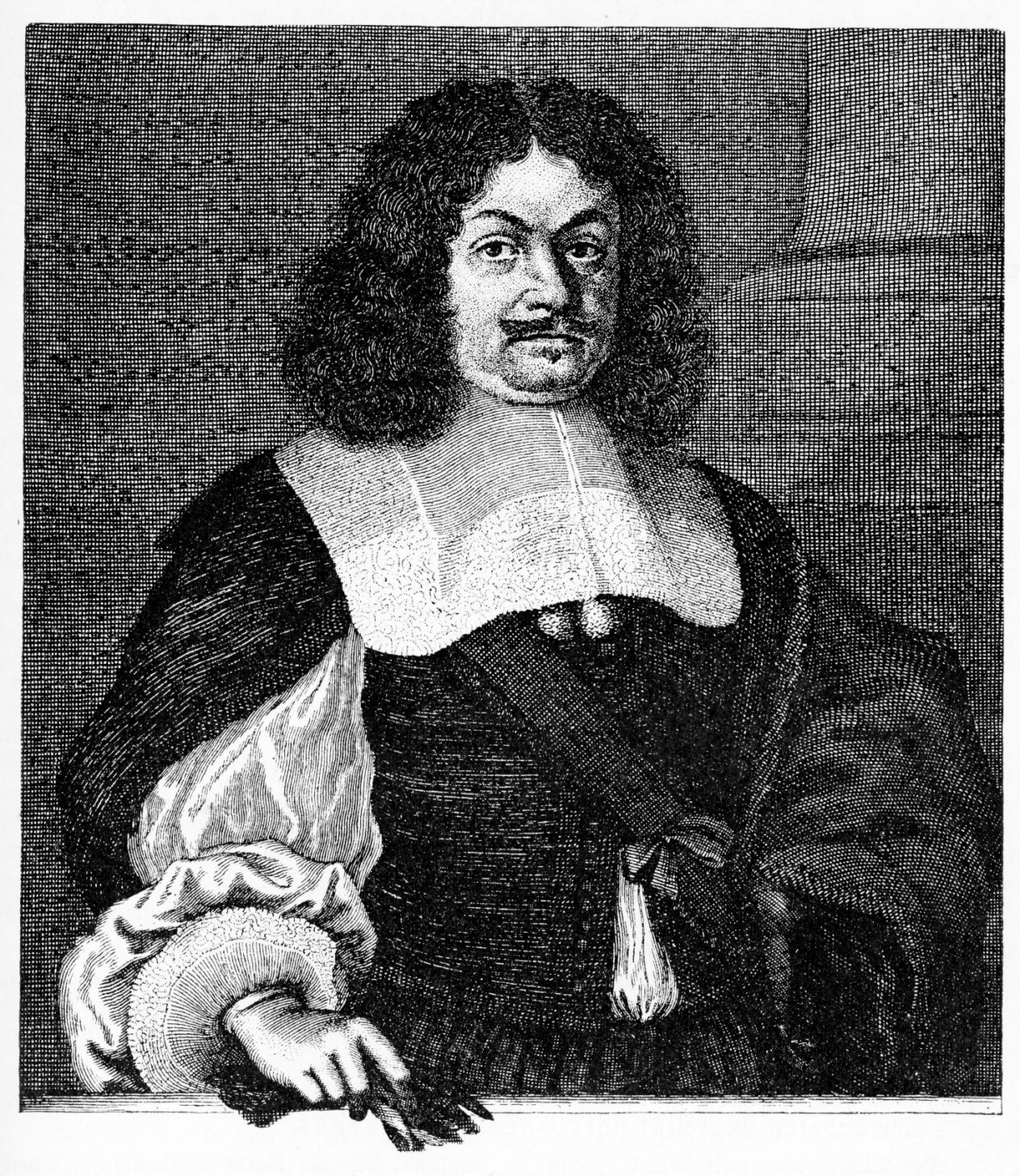
The creator and master of German Baroque tragedy, Andreas Gryphius, whose work was greatly influenced by Vondel

Apart from his influence on works of Dutch-language literature, Vondel's work had significant - although at the same time limited - influence abroad; to a large extent this had to do with the fact that his work was not translated during his life in any other language but German. Because of the German translations of his work, Vondel had a considerable influence on German Baroque literature, especially on the dramatic works of this period. Particularly the works of Andreas Gryphius, the creator and master of German Baroque tragedy, were significantly influenced by Vondel's plays. Since Andreas Gryphius lived in The Dutch Republic for several years, it is assumed that he visited the performance of Vondel's plays. Gryphius was in any case well acquainted with his work; he translated Vondel's Gebroeders into German, and moreover, his verse and style, as well as his dramatic technique, were derived from the plays of Vondel. Partly through Gryphius, but also through motifs that were common in Vondel's drama's, playwrights like Daniel Casper von Lohenstein and Johann Christian Hallmann were indebted to his work as well. Another significant influence that Vondel had on German literature was through the work of "the father of German literature" Martin Opitz, who was particularly influenced with regard to the structure of the rhythm and meter of his verses.

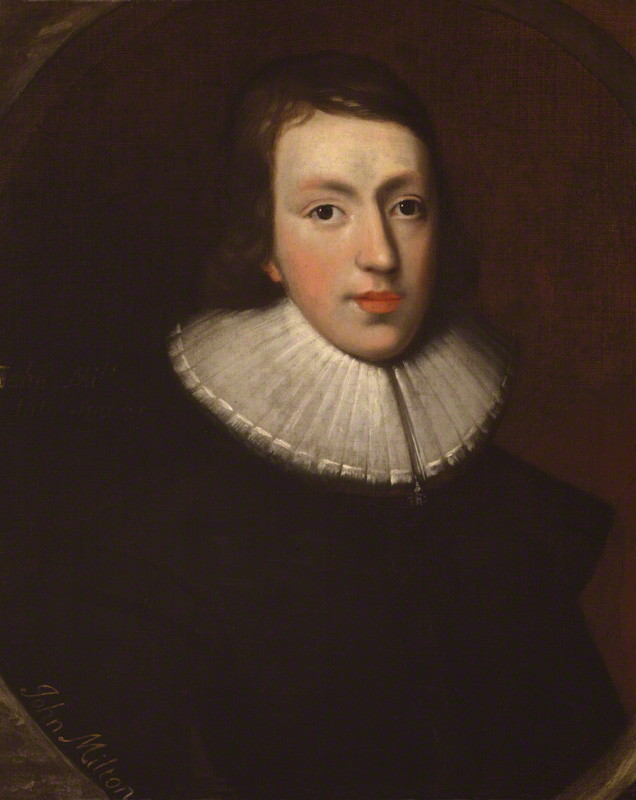
The English poet John Milton, whose work was according to some authors influenced by Vondel's Lucifer or Samson.

A controversial and ongoing discussion, is the possible influence Vondel had on the works of John Milton. During the 1880s, it was suggested by George Edmundson, that John Milton drew inspiration from Vondel's Lucifer (1654) and Adam in ballingschap (1664) for the writing of his epic poem Paradise Lost (1667). Subsequently, this view has been heavily criticized and today there is consensus among scholars that there is not a direct influence of Lucifer on Paradise Lost, but rather a common use of the biblical creation story as the main source of both works, and possibly similarities of Vondel and Milton both using Hugo Grotius’ Adamus Exul as a model for their work. According to Watson Kirkconnell, Edmundson merely demonstrated, "scores of parallels." However, writing in 1952, Kirkconnell laid out his case that Milton was aware of Vondel. To prove that Milton knew the Dutch language, Kirkconnell quoted letter by Roger Williams to John Winthrop, "The Secretary of the Council, Mr. Milton, for my Dutch I read him, read me many more languages." Edmundson departs from a similar premise, namely that John Milton had a proficient knowledge of the Dutch language, and argues that Milton was acquainted with Vondel's work. Similarly, it has been argued that Milton at least knew who Vondel was, since Milton met Vondel's friend Hugo Grotius in Paris and was well acquainted with Franciscus Junius, who lived in England for many years. These matters led Kirkconnell - just like Edmundson - to believe that Vondel's Samson was in fact a major influence upon Milton's Samson Agonistes. The discussion remains unresolved, although it can be said that "Edmundson may have gone too far in a few respects in asserting Milton's indebtedness, (...) the other extreme by denying every relationship between Vondel and Milton" goes too far as well.

=== Critical reputation ===
Vondel is generally regarded as the greatest playwright and poet in the history of Dutch language literature. (Note: Although this is written in a work by Isaac D'Israeli, the opinion is expressed by the poet Robert Southey.) In his native country he is often referred to as "the Prince of Poets" and Dutch is sometimes - especially in France - called "the language of Vondel". Although his plays are generally considered to be his masterpieces, Vondel is equally acclaimed for his poetry. It has been said that Dutch lyric poetry reached the sublime in the work of Vondel, not only in the lyric "but in all genres". Theodoor Weevers for instance writes that Vondel "surpasses all Dutch poets by his versatility, by the scope and profundity of his thought, and by his apparently effortless command of all metrical forms with the exception of one, the sonnet, in which his achievement, although notable, is second to that of Hooft." Vondel was revered during his lifetime, by the 1640s he was already generally acknowledged as the greatest living poet in the Dutch Republic. This assessment was emphasized in 1653, when he was crowned with a laurel wreath at the festival of St. Lucas, to honor him "in recognition of his uncontested mastery of the art of poetry". When Vondel died, the pallbearers were given a memorial coin showing the poet on one side and on the other the inscription: "The country's oldest and greatest poet". In the centuries that followed, the view of Vondel as the greatest poet the Dutch language has produced, has not changed, although he has certainly not been without criticism, for instance with regard to his Catholicism or with regard to the structural choices of his plays. Nevertheless, from the 19th century onwards Vondel's play Lucifer has been regarded as a masterpiece and the absolute highlight of his oeuvre. In that light Albert Verwey remarked that "Vondel's work is like a mountain with a statue on top. That statue is his Lucifer.”

It has been said that Vondel's European importance lies in the fact that "his drama (...) is a consummation in classical (Sophoclean) form of the late medieval drama as it had become a Dutch tradition". A similar view is voiced by Jan Konst, who wrote: "Nowhere in the Europe of the 1660s does one find plays that breathe the spirit of Aristotle, that execute his ideas to such an extent as Vondel's tragedies". Moreover, it has been said, for instance by P.H. Albers, that Vondel "is the greatest poet the Netherlands has produced, one who is distinguished in every form and who occupies a place among the best poets of all time." Over the course of centuries many writers made analogies to poets and playwrights of other languages to illustrate Vondel's mastery of versification. Examples include comparisons to Dante Alighieri, William Shakespeare, Pedro Calderón de la Barca and Johann Wolfgang Goethe. Similar comparisons have been voiced by Watson Kirkconnell, who said "Vondel is to the Netherlands what Shakespeare is to England." Or Sir Edmund Gosse: "Not merely is he to Holland all that Camoens is to Portugal and Mickiewicz is to Poland, but he stands on a level with these men in the positive value of his writings." And Jean Stals, who translated Vondel's work into French and wanted to give it "its rightful place" amidst Dante, Corneille, Racine, Goethe, Schiller, Shakespeare, "not to mention the old ones". Indeed, Vondel's work, although acclaimed, is generally not well known outside of the Netherlands and Flanders, and for that reason many of the analogies are considered to be flawed. In that light, the novelist Frans Kellendonk wrote: "Indeed, Vondel is not a Dante, not a Shakespeare, not a Corneille. Vondel is Vondel".

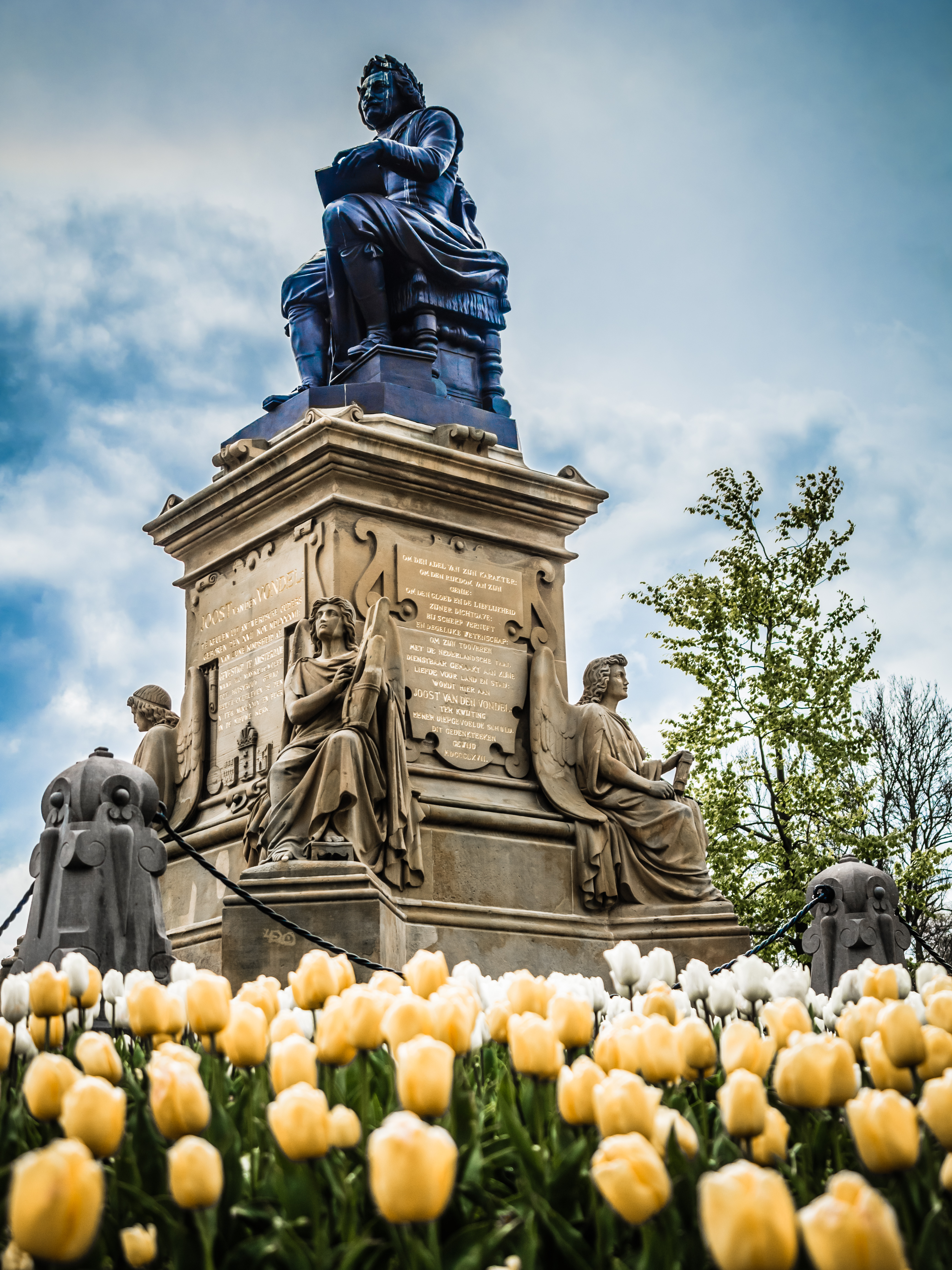
Louis Royer's statue of Vondel in the Vondelpark, typical of many created in the 19th and early 20th centuries

=== Commemoration ===
Over the centuries, many commemorations were initiated for Vondel. The veneration for Vondel in the Netherlands started in the late 19th century and probably reached the highpoint with the Commemoration of 1937, when a solemn meeting in Amsterdam was held and a commemoration book was published as a permanent contribution. Today, almost all cities in the Netherlands have at least one street named after Vondel, just like his native Cologne, where there is a Vondelstraße in the Neustadt-Süd-district. Another commemorative example is the Dutch five guilder banknote, which bore Vondel's portrait from 1950 until they were discontinued in 1990.

Arguably the most important commemoration for Vondel is Amsterdam's biggest park, the Vondelpark, especially with the statue of Vondel in the northern part of the park. The statue was erected in 1867 and made by the sculptor Louis Royer; the plinth for the statue was designed by the famous architect Pierre Cuypers.

== See also ==
- Western literature
- Dutch Renaissance and Golden Age literature
- Dutch Golden Age
- Dutch-language literature
- Johan van Oldenbarnevelt
- Hugo Grotius

== Sources ==
Books

- Baumgartner, Alexander (1886). Joost van den Vondel. Zijn leven en zijne werken. Amsterdam: C.L. van Langenhuysen.
- Bergsma, J. (1909). J. van Vondels Hekeldichten. Zutphen: W.J. Thieme & Cie.
- Bloemendal, Jan (2012). Bloemendal, Jan; Korsten, Frans-Willem (eds.). Joost van den Vondel (1587–1679) Dutch Playwright in the Golden Age. Leiden/Boston: Brill. ISBN 978-90-04-21753-9.
- Bowring, John (1824). Batavian Anthology or, specimens of the Dutch Poets. London: Taylor and Hessey.
- Brandt, Gerard (1682). Het leven van Joost van den Vondel. Amsterdam: Leonard Strik.
- Calis, Piet (2008). Vondel: Het verhaal van zijn leven. Amsterdam: Meulenhoff. ISBN 9789029081481.
- De Vries, Tiemen (1916). Holland's Influence on English Language and Literature. Chicago: C. Grentzebach.
- Disraeli, Isaac (1835). Amenities of Literature. London: Frederick Warne and Co.
- Edmundson, George (1885). Milton and Vondel: A Curiosity of Literature. London: Trübner & co.
- Geerdink, Nina (2012). Bloemendal, Jan; Korsten, Frans-Willem (eds.). Joost van den Vondel (1587–1679) Dutch Playwright in the Golden Age. Leiden/Boston: Brill. ISBN 978-90-04-21753-9.
- Grijp, Louis Peter (2012). Bloemendal, Jan; Korsten, Frans-Willem (eds.). Joost van den Vondel (1587–1679) Dutch Playwright in the Golden Age. Leiden/Boston: Brill. ISBN 978-90-04-21753-9.
- Grootes, Eddy (2012). Bloemendal, Jan; Korsten, Frans-Willem (eds.). Joost van den Vondel (1587–1679) Dutch Playwright in the Golden Age. Leiden/Boston: Brill. ISBN 978-90-04-21753-9.
- Grootes, Eddy (2009). Hermans, Theo (ed.). A Literary History of the Low Countries. London: Camden House. ISBN 9781571137449.
- Guerber, Hélène Adeline (1913). The Book of the Epic: The World's Great Epics Told in Story. Philadelphia: J.B. Lippincott. ISBN 9780266400363.
- Jensen, Lotte (2019). Romantici en revolutionairen. Amsterdam: Prometheus. ISBN 9789044630770.
- Kellendonk, Frans (1988). Geschilderd eten. Amsterdam: Meulenhoff. ISBN 9029027541.
- Kirkconnell, Watson (1952). The Celestial Cycle: The Theme of "Paradise Lost" in World Literature with Translations of the Major Analogues. Toronto: University of Toronto Press. ISBN 9780877520580.
- Kirkconnell, Watson (1964). That Invincible Samson: The Theme of Samson Agonistes in World Literature. Toronto: University of Toronto Press. ISBN 9781487592356.
- Knuvelder, G.P.M (1971). Handboek tot de geschiedenis der Nederlandse letterkunde. Deel 2. Den Bosch: Malmberg. ISBN 9020811622.
- Konst, Jan (1989). Lust tot poëzie. Gedichten van Joost van den Vondel. Amsterdam: Querido. ISBN 9789021405667.
- Konst, Jan (1993). Woedende wraakghierigheidt en vruchtelooze weeklachten. De hartstochten in de Nederlandse tragedie van de zeventiende eeuw. Assen: Uitgeverij Van Gorcum. ISBN 9023227719.
- Noak, Bettina (2012). Bloemendal, Jan; Korsten, Frans-Willem (eds.). Joost van den Vondel (1587–1679) Dutch Playwright in the Golden Age. Leiden/Boston: Brill. ISBN 978-90-04-21753-9.
- Schenkeveld-van der Dussen, Riet (2012). Bloemendal, Jan; Korsten, Frans-Willem (eds.). Joost van den Vondel (1587–1679) Dutch Playwright in the Golden Age. Leiden/Boston: Brill. ISBN 978-90-04-21753-9.
- Schenkeveld-van der Dussen, M.A. (1984). Spies, Marijke (ed.). Historische letterkunde. Facetten van vakbeoefening. Groningen: Wolters-Noordhoff. ISBN 9001805302.
- Smit, W.A.P. (1956). Van Pascha tot Noah. Zwolle: Tjeenk Willink. ISBN 9789011917026.
- Smits-Veldt, Mieke (2012). Bloemendal, Jan; Korsten, Frans-Willem (eds.). Joost van den Vondel (1587–1679) Dutch Playwright in the Golden Age. Leiden/Boston: Brill. ISBN 978-90-04-21753-9.
- Thys, Walter (2008). Intra & extra muros: verkenningen voornamelijk in de Neerlandistiek en het comparatisme. Delft: Eburon Uitgeverij B.V. ISBN 9789059722514.
- Van Eyck, P.N. (1964). Verzameld werk. Deel 7. Amsterdam: G.A. Van Oorschot.
- Van Gemert, Guillaume (2012). Bloemendal, Jan; Korsten, Frans-Willem (eds.). Joost van den Vondel (1587–1679) Dutch Playwright in the Golden Age. Leiden/Boston: Brill. ISBN 978-90-04-21753-9.
- Verwey, Albert (1937). Vondel: volledige dichtwerken en oorspronkelijk proza. Amsterdam: H. J. W. Becht.
- Verwey, Albert (1893). Een inleiding tot Vondel. Amsterdam: W. Versluys.
- Weevers, Theodoor (1960). Poetry of the Netherlands in its European context. London: University of London The Athlone Press.

Articles and online

- Albers, P.H. "Joost van Den Vondel". The Catholic Encyclopedia.
- Brom, Gerard (1949). "De roem van Gezelle". Dietsche Warande en Belfort (94): 545–613.
- Honings, Rick (2012). "'Een ruwe diamant, maar van het eerste water' Het Vondelbeeld in de eerste helft van de negentiende eeuw". De Zeventiende Eeuw. 28 (2): 176–195. JSTOR 23978438.
- Kazartsev, Evgeny (2013). "Niederländische Quellen von Martin Opitz' Versrhythmik". Zeitschrift für Germanistik. 23 (3): 499–509. doi:10.3726/92140_499. JSTOR 23978438.
- Smit, W.A.P. (1966). "Vondel en het Epos". De Nieuwe Taalgids. 6 (59): 405–418.
- Vincent, Paul (1987). "Roskam". Dutch Crossing (32).
