= Ruggles (surname) =

Ruggles is a surname. Notable people with the surname include:

- Alice Ruggles Sohier (1880–1969), née Ruggles, American painter
- Carl Ruggles (1876–1971), American composer
- Charles H. Ruggles (1789–1865), American lawyer, politician, and judge
- Charlie Ruggles (1886–1970), American character actor
- Clive Ruggles (born 1952), British astronomer
- Daniel Ruggles (1810–1897), Confederate general
- David Ruggles (1810–1849), American abolitionist
- Eleanor Ruggles (1916-2008), American biographer
- Joseph Ruggles Wilson (1822–1903), American minister
- Joss Sackler, née Ruggles, Canadian fashion designer
- Nathaniel Ruggles (1761–1819), American lawyer, judge, and politician
- Samuel B. Ruggles (1800–1881), American lawyer and founder of Gramercy Park, New York City
- Steven Ruggles (born 1955), American historical demographer
- Timothy Ruggles (1711–1795), American military leader, jurist and politician
- Timothy Ruggles (Nova Scotia politician) (1776–1831), Canadian politician
- Tom Ruggles (born 1992), Australian footballer
- Wesley Ruggles (1889–1972), American film director and producer
- William Ruggles (1797–1877), American professor

== Fictional character ==
- Nell Ruggles, a character in the comic book series Squadron Supreme
