= Ruggles of Red Gap (disambiguation) =

Ruggles of Red Gap is a 1935 American comedy film.

Ruggles of Red Gap may also refer to:

- Ruggles of Red Gap (1918 film), a lost American silent comedy film
- Ruggles of Red Gap (1923 film), a lost American Western silent film
