= Ruggles House =

Ruggles House may refer to:

- Ruggles House (Maine) in Columbia Falls, Maine
- Draper Ruggles House in Worcester, Massachusetts
- Lucy Ruggles House in Burlington, Vermont
- Ruggles Woodbridge House, South Hadley, Hampshire County, Massachusetts
