= Wisse Alfred Pierre Smit =

Dutch poet and literary historian

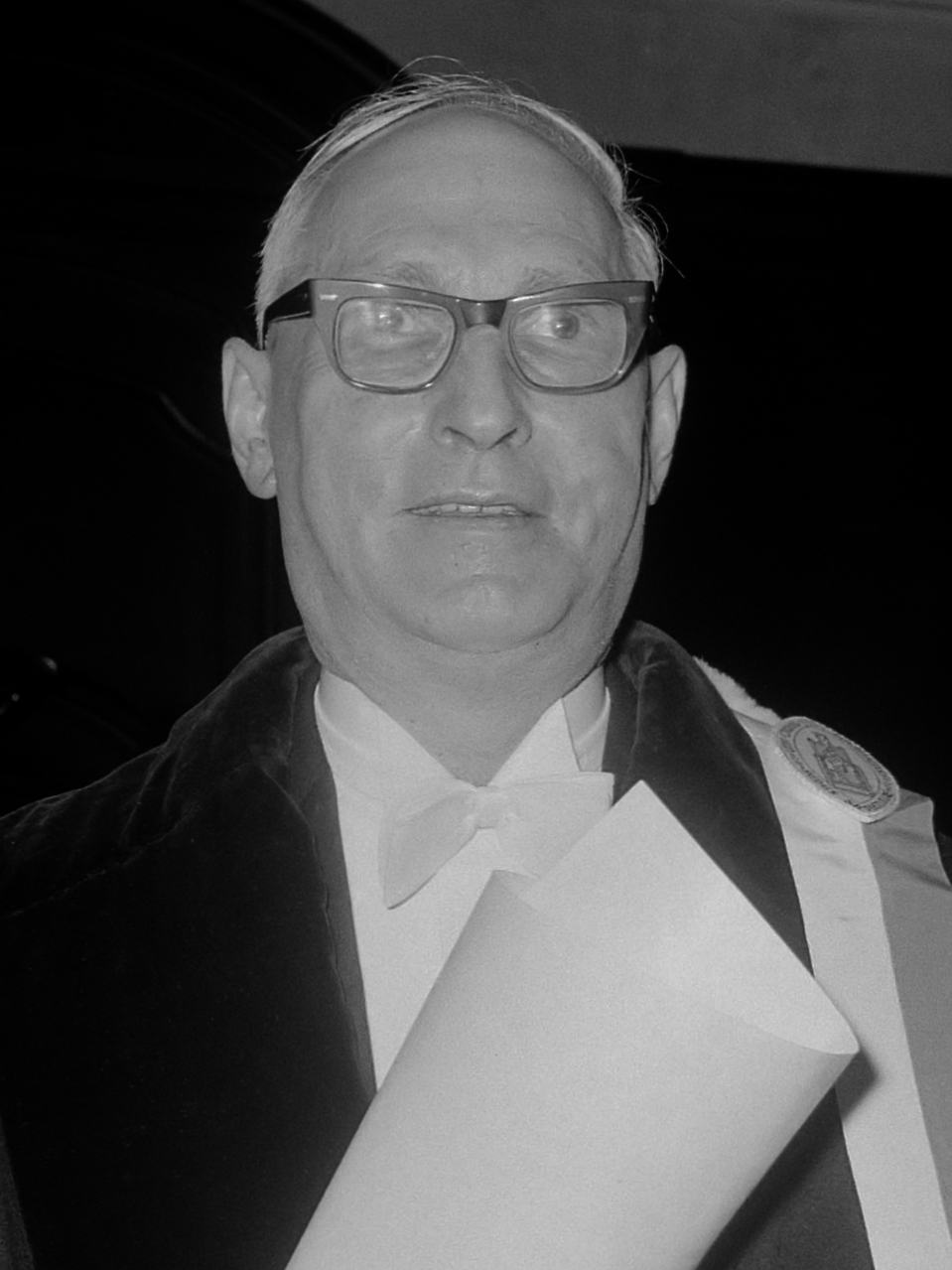
Wisse Alfred Pierre Smit (1966)

Wisse Alfred Pierre Smit (6 December 1903, in Heumen, Gelderland – 20 June 1986) was a poet and an influential Dutch literary historian. He was a specialist in Dutch literature of the Golden Age (17th century).

== Biography ==
W.A.P. Smit worked as a teacher for 17 years, before he accepted a professorship in Dutch literature at the University of Utrecht in 1945. He published various works of poetry and editions of a number of 16th and 17th century Dutch poets. He gained academic renown with a number of studies on various aspects of 17th century Dutch literature. Through his publications and his guidance to doctoral students, he had a considerable influence on the development of Dutch literary history in the 20th century.

In 1958 he became member of the Royal Netherlands Academy of Arts and Sciences.
