= William Ruggles =

American mathematician (1797–1877)

William Ruggles (September 5, 1797 – September 10, 1877) was an American professor at George Washington University.

== Biography ==
William Ruggles was born in Rochester, Massachusetts, about fifty miles south of present-day Boston, on Tuesday September 5, 1797. He was the son of Elisha Ruggles and Mary Clap who also parented six other children: Nathaniel, Micah, Henry, Charles, James, and Lucy. William was the second youngest child in his family. Not much is known about his childhood growing up in Massachusetts until he enrolled in Brown University; where he later graduated from, at the age of twenty-three, in the class of 1820. Two years after graduating from Brown University, Ruggles became a tutor at Columbian College. On February 9, 1821 Congress chartered Columbian College, a nonsectarian school but with Baptist sponsorship that would not become the George Washington University until January 23, 1904. In 1824, two years after he became a tutor, Ruggles became a Professor of Mathematics and Natural Philosophy, a position he would retain until 1865. In 1827 William Ruggles became the chair of both mathematics and natural philosophy. In 1865 Ruggles was made professor emeritus. He continued to lecture on political economy and civil polity from 1865 to 1874. He died at Schooley's Mountain, New Jersey, on Monday, September 10, 1877, five days after his eightieth birthday.

== Legacy ==
Ruggles was a man of many admirable characteristics including loyalty, conscientiousness, and morality, which are shown not only through the words of those who describe him but through his actions as well. The best example of William Ruggles' loyalty was shown in his dedication to the Columbian College itself. Until 1985, no person had a longer stay at the George Washington University. Ruggles came to the George Washington University in 1822 and stayed until his death, a record at the time, of fifty-five and a half years, which has only been surpassed once by Elmer Louis Kayser who came to the university as a student in 1914 and stayed until his eventual death in 1985. William Ruggles was involved at the Columbian College (George Washington University) from almost the beginning of the Columbian College. He lived through the drab years of 1826 through 1842 where mounting debt and pressure threatened to shut down the Columbian College and rejoiced harder than anyone when that debt was lifted. He served under the first six presidents of the institution and even served as acting president three times. He saw a large student body dwindle down to a handful of students due to the US civil war. Since the college buildings were being used as a hospital in the war efforts, classes were taught in the homes of professors. Lastly, Professor Ruggles had the enjoyment of being a contemporary to University President Welling.

Ruggles was the owner of over thirty historical and archival books which are now located in the Gelman Library Archives at George Washington University. The subjects include theology, philosophy, psychology, economics, mathematics (algebra and geometry), and chemistry, all of which Ruggles either taught or was passionate about.

Ruggles was described by President Welling, the second president of the George Washington University:

When the Board was tardy in paying salaries or when it embarked on some policy he opposed, his resignation was always forthcoming .... A member of no religious denomination, but dealing almost exclusively with Baptists, he observed on the basis of attitudes, that he was perhaps the better Christian .... [he was] a man of great conscientiousness, high intelligence and blameless character. His excellent portrait in the University collection suggests a very wise man who perhaps was not always loved but who was respected.

— President Welling

The Board of Trustees, in adopting resolutions in appreciation of his services, declared Ruggles in similar words to Welling, saying, "We hereby testify and record our exulted sense of the virtues which adorned his private character, the unselfish zeal he brought to the performance of all his duties and the inestimable value of the manifold and multiform services which he rendered to the College during the long period of his connection with its history."

William Ruggles was noted for his generous contributions to charities and missionary bequests. His accomplishments and contributions were honored and recognized when he received an honorary LL.D. from Brown University in 1852, the same school that he graduated from more than thirty years prior

Upon reviewing letters that Ruggles had written, it can be seen that he was full of charity towards his students. While he may be described as someone who was "not always loved but who was always respected," it can be seen that Ruggles did have great affection towards the students he taught. On November 24, 1837, Ruggles wrote a letter to Joel R. Poinsett about the character of a young man named John D. Kuntz, who was expecting to make appointment as a cadet at West Point Military Academy. In the letter Ruggles goes on to praise the young boy and even go as far as to call him, "a young man of sound principles." William Ruggles' folders were filled with many such letters, expressing his kind opinions on the young students that he respected and cared for. Although it is noted that Ruggles was a man of spirit, he was a member of no religion despite the fact that he dealt almost exclusively with the Baptist church. Ruggles shared very many correspondences with Reverend Elon Galusha with letters dating from November 1825 all the way until April 1832, while it is unclear what the two wrote about it clear that these letters dealt with Ruggles faith. In a letter preserved to a different Reverend, Ruggles states that,

"Oh, whatever else is taken from me, may I have a share in the great inheritance purchased by Jesus Christ for those who love him and are regenerated by the Holy Spirit!"

Although William Ruggles died 1877, a reprint of his obituary appeared in the Faculty Newsletter volume 2, number 1, Spring 1965 as part of a series of called GW Footnotes. It was titled the 55-Year Professor and was the first in a series of anecdotes from the university's past written by the university historian.

== Ruggles Prizes ==
The Ruggles Prizes are awarded annually for excellence in mathematics to a candidate for a bachelor's degree. The prizes were initiated in 1859, and consists of two gold medals. They are awarded "upon examination to the best two scholars in Mathematics."
