= Agatha (given name) =

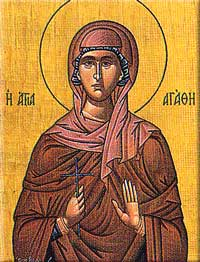
- An Orthodox icon of St. Agatha of Sicily, the saint responsible for the wide usage of the name Agatha
- Pronunciation: /ˈæɡəθə/
- Gender: Female
- Language: Ancient Greek
- Name day: 5 February

Origin
- Meaning: "good"

Other names
- Variant forms: Ágatha, Agata, Ágata, Agafa
- See also: Ag, Aggy, Aggi, Aggie

Agatha, also Agata, is a feminine given name derived from the Greek feminine name Ἀγάθη (Agáthē; alternative form: Ἀγαθή Agathḗ), which is a nominalized form of ἀγαθή (agathḗ), i.e. the feminine form of the adjective ἀγαθός (agathós) "good".

It was the name of St. Agatha of Sicily, a third-century Christian martyr. Rarely has the name been given in English-speaking countries during recent years. Agatha was last ranked among the top 1,000 names for girls born in the United States during the 1930s.

“Agatha” is a common name in Greece and countries that speak Germanic languages.

== Russian name ==
In Russian, the name "Ага́та" (Agata) was borrowed from the Western European languages, and derives from the same Ancient Greek root from which older names Agafya and Agafa also come. Its masculine version is Agat. In 1924–1930, the name was included into various Soviet calendars, which included the new and often purposefully created names promoting the new Soviet realities and encouraging the break with the tradition of using the names in the Synodal Menologia.

Its diminutives include Agatka (Ага́тка), Aga (А́га), and Gata (Га́та).

== Regional variants ==
- Agaate (Estonian)
- Agafia (Ukrainian)
- Agat(h)e (Danish, French, Greek, Norwegian)
- Agata or Ágata (Galician, Portuguese, Italian, Polish, Slovene, Spanish, Swedish, foreign adaptation for Ukrainian)
- Agáta (Czech, Slovak)
- Ágota/Agota (Hungarian, Lithuanian)
- Agate (Latvian)
- Águeda (Galician, Portuguese, Spanish)
- Àgueda or Àgata (Catalan)
- Ukanesh, Ukiana (Chuvash)
- Agatha, Agata (Indonesian)
- Ågot (Norwegian)
- Agafya (Russian)

=== Diminutive variants ===
- Aagje or Aagtje (Dutch)
- Agacia (Polish)
- Agusia (Polish)
- Agatina (Italian)
- Agatka (Polish)
- Aggie (English)
- Ági (Hungarian)
- Agunia (Polish)
- Aguś (Polish)
- Agotėlė (Lithuanian)
- Agasha (Russian)
- Ague (Spanish)
- Aet (Estonian)

== People ==
=== Agatha ===
- Agatha of Sicily (died 251), Christian saint sometime spelled as Saint Agata
- Agatha (wife of Samuel of Bulgaria) (born 10th century), Bulgarian Empress
- Agatha (wife of Edward the Exile) (before 1030 – after 1070), Anglo-Saxon royalty
- Agatha of Lorraine (c.1120–1147), wife of Renaud III, Count of Burgundy
- Agatha Christine of Hanau-Lichtenberg (1632–1681), daughter of Count Philip Wolfgang of France
- Agatha Marie of Hanau (1599–1636), German countess
- Agatha Amata (born 1969), Nigeria television personality
- Agatha Bacovia (1895–1981), Romanian poet
- Agatha Barbara (1923–2002), only female President of Malta
- Agatha Bârsescu (1857–1939), Romanian actress, opera singer, and teacher
- Ágatha Bednarczuk (born 1983), Brazilian beach volleyball player
- Agatha Bennett (1919–2006), American artist
- Agatha Biddle (1797–1873), French fur trader
- Agatha Chapman (1907–1963), British-Canadian economist
- Agatha Christie (1890–1976), English crime writer
- Agatha Deken (1741–1804), Dutch writer
- Agatha Dietschi (fl. 1547), German cross dresser
- Agatha Gothe-Snape (born 1980), Australian artist
- Agatha Harrison (1885–1954), English industrial welfare reformer
- Agatha Jassem, Canadian microbiologist
- Agatha Kong (born 1988), Hong Kong singer
- Agatha Lin (1817–1858), Chinese saint and martyr
- Agatha Maksimova (born 1993), Russian-French actress, model, and beauty pageant titleholder
- Agatha Moreira (born 1992), Brazilian actress and model
- Agatha van der Mijn (1700–c.1780), Dutch flower painter
- Agatha Lovisa de la Myle (died 1787), Baltic-German and Latvian poet
- Ágatha Ruiz de la Prada (born 1960), Spanish noble and fashion designer
- Agatha Sangma (born 1980), member of the Parliament of India
- Agatha Streicher (1520–1581), German physician
- Agatha Welhouk (1637–1715), Dutch woman setting a legal precedent with regard to marriage
- Agatha Wong (born 1998), Filipino wushu athlete
- Agatha Yi Kyong-i (1814–1840), Korean saint and martyr
- Agatha Zethraeus (1872–1966), Dutch artist

=== Agathe ===
- Agathe Aladin (born 1967), Haitian artist
- Agathe Backer Grøndahl (1847–1907), Norwegian pianist and composer
- Agathe L. van Beverwijk (1907–1963), Dutch mycologist and botanist
- Agathe Bonitzer (born 1989), French actress
- Agathe-Pauline Caylac de Caylan (1782–1847), French writer
- Agathe Fontain (born 1951), Greenlandic politician
- Agathe Alexandrine Gavaudan (1801–1877), French operatic contralto
- Agathe Génois (born 1952), Canadian writer
- Agathe Habyarimana (born 1942), the widow of former Rwandan President
- Agathe de La Boulaye (born 1972), French actress
- Agathe de La Fontaine (born 1972), French actress
- Agathe Laisné (born 1999), French golfer
- Agathe Lasch (1879–1942), German philologist
- Agathe Lecaron (born 1974), French radio and television presenter
- Agathe Max, French violinist
- Agathe Meunier (born 1993), French acrobatic gymnast
- Agathe N'Nindjem-Yolemp (born 1980), Cameroonian basketball player
- Agathe Ngani (born 1992), Cameroonian footballer
- Agathe Ngo Nack (born 1958), Cameroonian athlete
- Agathe Pembellot (1942–2016), Congolese judge
- Agathe Poschmann (born 1922), German actress
- Agathe de Rambaud (1764–1853), French royal nanny
- Agathe Rousselle (born 1988), French journalist, model, and actress
- Agathe de Saint-Père (1657–1748), French-Canadian business entrepreneur and inventor
- Agathe de Saint Etienne de La Tour (1690–1765), Canadian landowner
- Agathe-Sophie Sasserno (1810–1860), French poet
- Agathe Sauzon (born 1992), French golfer
- Agathe Snow (born 1976), New York based artist
- Agathe Sochat (born 1995), French rugby union player
- Agathe Sorel (born 1935), London artist
- Agathe Thornton (1910–2006), New Zealand academic
- Agathe von Trapp (1913–2010), eldest daughter of the Trapp Family Singers
- Agathe Turgis (1892–?), French fencer
- Agathe Uwilingiyimana (1953–1994), Rwandan Prime Minister 1993–1994
- Agathe Whitehead (1891–1922), British-Austrian heiress and aritocrat

=== Agata ===
- Agata Balsamo (born 1970), Italian long-distance runner
- Agata Barańska (born 1993), Polish tennis player
- Agata Biernat (born 1989), Polish beauty pageant titleholder
- Agata Błażowska (born 1978), Polish ice dancer
- Agata Bulwa (born 1975), Polish archer
- Agata Buzek (born 1976), Polish actress
- Agata Ciabattoni, Italian mathematician
- Ágata Cruz, pseudonym of Luz Machado (1916–1999), Venezuelan political activist, journalist, and poet
- Agata Czaplicki (born 1983), Swiss swimmer
- Agata della Pietà (fl. c. 1800), Italian composer, singer, and teacher of music
- Agata Flori (born 1938), Italian film actress
- Agata Forkasiewicz (born 1994), Polish sprinter
- Agata Gotova (born 1971), Russian child actress
- Agata Grzybowska (born 1984), Polish photojournalist
- Agata Guściora (born 1994), Polish footballer
- Agata Hikari (1943–1992), Japanese novelist and translator
- Agata Karczmarek (1963–2016), Polish long jumper
- Agata Karczmarzewska-Pura (born 1978), Polish volleyball player
- Agata Korc (born 1986), Polish swimmer
- Agata Kornhauser-Duda (born 1972), wife of Andrzej Duda, president of Poland
- Agáta Koupilová (born 1999), Czech para swimmer
- Agata Kowalska-Szubert (1968–2025), Polish scholar
- Agata Kryger (born 1997), Polish figure skater
- Agata Kulesza (born 1971), Polish actress
- Agata Materowicz (born 1963), Polish artist
- Agata Mróz-Olszewska (1982–2008), Polish volleyball player
- Agata Muceniece (born 1989), Latvian actress, model, and television presenter
- Agata Ozdoba (born 1988), Polish judoka
- Agata Parahina (born 1999), Russian draughts player
- Agata Passent (born 1973), Polish journalist and writer
- Agata Perenc (born 1990), Polish judoka
- Agata Pietrzyk (born 1988), Polish freestyle wrestler
- Agata Piszcz, Polish sprint canoeist
- Agata Pyzik (born 1983), Polish journalist and cultural critic
- Agata Różańska (born 1968), Polish astronomer and astrophysicist
- Agata Sawicka (born 1985), Polish volleyball player
- Agata Smogorzewska, Polish scientist
- Agata Smoktunowicz (born 1973), Polish mathematician
- Agata Sobczyk (born 1988), Polish economist and politician
- Agata Strausa (born 1989), Latvian long-distance runner
- Agata Suszka (born 1971), Polish biathlete
- Agata Szymczewska (born 1985), Polish violinist
- Agata Tarczyńska (born 1988), Polish footballer
- Agata Trzebuchowska (born 1992), Polish actress
- Agata Tuszyńska (born 1957), Polish writer, poet and journalist
- Agata Vostruchovaitė (born 2000), Lithuanian artistic gymnast
- Agata Witkowska (born 1989), Polish volleyball player
- Agata Wojtyszek (born 1967), Polish politician
- Agata Wróbel (born 1981), Polish weightlifter
- Agata Wybieralska (born 1978), Polish-Italian field hockey player
- Agata Zubel (born 1978), Polish composer and singer
- Agata Zupin (born 1998), Slovenian hurdler

== Fictional characters ==
- Agatha de Lacey, a minor character in Mary Shelley's Frankenstein
- Agatha Crumm, the title character of a newspaper comic strip
- Agatha Hannigan, disturbed caregiver and central antagonist of Annie (musical)
- Agatha Harkness, Marvel Comics witch
- Agatha Raisin, amateur detective in a series of novels by M.C. Beaton
- Agatha Troy, Ngaio Marsh character, wife of Roderick Alleyn
- Agatha Trunchbull, the sadistic antagonist of Roald Dahl's book and film Matilda
- Agatha, from the 2014 American comedy The Grand Budapest Hotel

== See also ==
- Agathe Cléry, 2008 French movie
