= Agat =

Agat or AGAT may refer to:

- Agat, Burma, a village in Ayeyarwady Region, Burma
- Agat, Eritrea, a railway station in Eritrea
- Agat, Guam, a village in Guam
- Agat (computer), Soviet 8-bit computer
- Agat (given name), Russian masculine first name
- Uru Harbour Airport, an airport in Atoifi, Solomon Islands
- JW Agat, a unit of the Polish Special Forces
- AGAT, an abbreviation for arginine:glycine amidinotransferase, an enzyme
- AGAT, an abbreviation for O-6-methylguanine-DNA methyltransferase, a protein
