= List of people from the Dutch Golden Age =

The Dutch Golden Age was a period in Dutch history, roughly equivalent to the 17th century, in which Dutch trade, science and art were top ranking in the world until Tulip Mania in 1637 and onwards.

The accompanying article about the Dutch Golden Age focuses on society, religion and culture. There are also articles about the Eighty Years' War (the Dutch revolt against Spain) and the Anglo-Dutch Wars. A concise broader picture is painted in History of the Netherlands.

People are listed here per category in order of year of birth.

Note: Many Dutchmen from this period had a middle name ending in szoon, which means son of. It is also commonly written as sz., for instance Rembrandt Harmensz. van Rijn.

== Sciences and philosophy ==
- Jacob van Langren (c. 1525 – 1610), Dutch cartographer and globe-maker.
- Carolus Clusius (1526–1609), Flemish doctor and botanist
- Simon Stevin (1548–1620), Flemish-Dutch mathematician and engineer
- Cornelis Corneliszoon (1550–ca. 1600), inventor of the wind-powered sawmill
- Petrus Plancius (1552–1622), Dutch astronomer and cartographer
- Jodocus Hondius (1563–1612), Flemish-Dutch cartographer
- Willem Blaeu (1571–1638), Dutch cartographer
- Jan Leeghwater (1575–1650), hydraulic engineer
- Willebrord Snellius (1580–1626), Dutch astronomer and mathematician
- Hugo Grotius (1583–1645), Dutch jurist and philosopher, who laid the foundations for international law
- Isaac Beeckman (1588–1637), Dutch philosopher
- David Gorlaeus (1591-1612), Dutch natural philosopher and proponent of atomism
- Jan Amos Comenius (1592–1670), Czech educator and writer
- Nicolaes Tulp (1593–1674), doctor, magistrate, and mayor of Amsterdam
- René Descartes (1596–1650), French philosopher lived in Holland from 1628 to 1649
- Joan Blaeu (1596–1673), Dutch cartographer, Willem Blaeu's son
- Franciscus Sylvius (1614–1672), German-born Dutch physician
- Frans van Schooten (1615–1660), Dutch mathematician
- Johannes Phocylides Holwarda (1618-1651), Dutch natural philosopher and proponent of atomism
- Christiaan Huygens (1629–1695), Dutch mathematician, physicist and astronomer
- Frederik de Wit (1630–1706), engraver, cartographer and publisher
- Baruch de Spinoza (1632–1677), Dutch Jewish philosopher
- John Locke (1632–1704), English philosopher, exiled in Holland (1683–1688)
- Anton van Leeuwenhoek (1632–1723), Dutch scientist and businessman, first microbiologist
- Jan Swammerdam (1637–1680), Dutch biologist and microscopist
- Nicolas Steno (1638–1686), Danish Catholic bishop and scientist
- Frederik Ruysch (1638–1731), Dutch botanist and anatomist
- Regnier de Graaf (1641–1673), Dutch physician and anatomist
- Menno van Coehoorn (1641–1704), Dutch military engineer
- Pierre Bayle (1647–1706), French philosopher and writer
- Govert Bidloo (1649–1713), physician, anatomist and author who wrote the anatomical atlas Anatomia Humani Corporis
- Bernard Mandeville (1670–1733), Dutch philosopher, political economist and satirist

== Religion ==
- Jacobus Arminius (1560–1609), Dutch theologian, served from 1603 as professor in theology at the University of Leiden
- Gerardus Vossius (1577-1649), Dutch theologian and humanist
- Gisbertus Voetius (1589-1676), Dutch theologian, served from 1634 as professor in theology at the University of Utrecht. Noted opponent of Cartesianism.

== Painting ==
The best known Dutch painters of the 17th century include:

- Frans Hals (ca. 1583–1666), portraits, schutterstukken, regent groups, genre pieces (inns, figures)
- Hendrick Avercamp (1585–1634), landscapes with snow
- Hendrick Terbruggen (1588–1629), historical and biblical paintings
- Willem Claeszoon Heda (1594–1680), still lifes
- Jan van Goyen (1596–1656), landscapes
- Pieter Jansz Saenredam (1597–1665), church interiors, cityscapes
- Salomon van Ruysdael (ca. 1600–1670), landscapes
- Adriaen Brouwer (c. 1605–1638), genre pieces (inns)
- Rembrandt Harmenszoon van Rijn (1606–1669), historical and biblical paintings, portraits, schutterstukken, regent groups, genre pieces (figures)
- Jan Lievens (1607–1674), historical and biblical paintings, portraits
- Adriaen van Ostade (1610–1685), genre scenes of peasant life
- Willem van de Velde, the elder (ca. 1611–1693), seascapes
- Bartholomeus van der Helst (1613–1670), portraits, schutterstukken, regent groups
- Jan Both (1615–1652), Italian landscapes
- Govert Flinck (1615–1660), historical and biblical paintings, portraits, schutterstukken
- Ferdinand Bol (1616–1680), historical and biblical paintings
- Emanuel de Witte (ca. 1617–1692), church interiors
- Gerard Terborch (1617–1681), portraits, genre pieces (family scenes)
- Philips Wouwermans (1619–1668), landscapes
- Aelbert Cuyp (1620–1691), Italian and Dutch landscapes
- Carel Fabritius (1622–1654), historical and biblical paintings, genre pieces (figures)
- Paulus Potter (1625–1654), animals in landscapes
- Jan Steen (1626–1679), genre pieces (inns, family scenes)
- Jacob Isaakszoon van Ruisdael (c. 1628–1682)
- Gabriel Metsu (1629–1667), genre pieces (family scenes)
- Pieter de Hooch (1629–1683), genre pieces (family scenes)
- Johannes Vermeer (1632–1675), cityscapes, genre pieces (family scenes)
- Nicolaes Maes (1634–1693), portraits, genre pieces (family scenes, figures)
- Meindert Hobbema (1638–1709), landscapes

For a more comprehensive listing, see the List of Dutch painters.

Less famous painters from this period were:

- Cornelis Ketel (1548–1616), portraits, schutterstukken
- Hendrik Goltzius (1558–1617), landscapes
- Cornelis Corneliszoon van Haarlem (1562–1638), portraits, historical and biblical paintings
- Abraham Bloemaert (1566–1651), historical and biblical paintings, landscapes
- Michiel Janszoon van Miereveld (1567–1641), portraits
- Johannes Anthoniszoon van Ravesteyn (ca. 1570 – 1657), portraits
- Ambrosius Bosschaert (1573–1621), flowers
- Floris Claeszoon van Dijck (1575–1651), still lifes
- Roelant Savery (1576–1639), landscapes
- Cornelis van der Voort (1576–1624), portraits, schuttersstukken
- Jan Pynas (ca. 1580–1633), historical and biblical paintings
- Pieter Pieterszoon Lastman (1583–1633), historical and biblical paintings
- Jan Porcellis (1584–1632), sea sights
- Hercules Seghers (ca. 1589–1638), landscapes
- Gerhard van Honthorst (1590–1656), historical and biblical paintings, genre pieces (family scenes, figures)
- Dirck van Baburen (ca. 1590–1624), genre pieces (figures)
- Cornelis Hendrickszoon Vroom (ca. 1591–1661), sea sights
- Esayas van der Velde (ca. 1591–1630), landscapes
- Dirck Hals (1591–1656), genre pieces (family scenes, figures)
- Willem Pieterszoon Buytewech (ca. 1591–1624), landscapes, genre pieces (figures)
- Balthasar van der Ast (ca. 1593–1657), flowers
- Cornelis van Poelenburgh (1594–1667), Italian landscapes
- Pieter de Molijn (1595–1661), landscapes
- Thomas de Keyser (ca. 1596–1667), portraits, schutterstukken
- Johannes Corneliszoon Verspronck (1597–1662), portraits
- Pieter Claesz (ca. 1597–1660), still lifes
- Bartholomeus Breenbergh (1599–1657), Italian landscapes
- Pieter Franszoon de Grebber (c. 1600–1652), historical and biblical paintings
- Gerrit Hoeckgeest (ca. 1600–1661), church interiors
- Simon de Vlieger (1601–1653), sea sights
- Aert van der Neer (1603–1677), sea sights
- Christiaen van Couwenbergh (1604–1667), historical and biblical paintings
- Jan Davidszoon de Heem (1606–ca.1683), still lifes
- Judith Leyster (1609–1660), genre pieces (figures)
- Hendrik Martenszoon Sorgh (1609/1611–1670)
- Jan Asselyn (1610–1652), Italian landscapes
- David Teniers the Younger (1610–1690), genre pieces (inns)
- Jan Miense Molenaer (ca. 1610–1668), genre pieces (family scenes)
- Pieter de Ringh (1615–1660), still lifes
- Caesar van Everdingen (1617–1678), historical and biblical paintings
- Willem Kalf (1619–1693), still lifes
- Philips Koninck (1619–1688), landscapes
- Otto Marseus van Schrieck (c. 1619–1678), flowers
- Nicolaes Pieterszoon Berchem (1621–1683), Italian landscapes
- Abraham van Beyeren (ca. 1620–1690), still lifes
- Jan Baptist Weenix (1621–1663), Italian landscapes
- Gerbrand van den Eeckhout (1621–1674)
- Karel Dujardin (1622–1678), Italian landscapes
- Adam Pynacker (1622–1673), Italian landscapes
- Abraham Danielsz Hondius (c. 1625–1695), dogs, hunting scenes and landscapes
- Jan van de Cappelle (1626–1679), seascapes
- Job Adriaenszoon Berckheyde (1630–1693), church interiors
- Willem Drost (1630–1680), historical and biblical paintings
- Frederik de Moucheron (1633–1686), Italian landscapes
- Jan de Baen (1633–1702), portraits
- Willem van de Velde the younger (1633–1707), sea sights
- Frans van Mieris sr. (1635–1681), genre pieces (family scenes, figures)
- Adriaen van de Velde (1636–1672), landscapes
- Gerrit Adriaenszoon Berckheyde (1636–1698), cityscapes
- Jan van der Heyden (1637–1712), cityscapes
- Caspar Netscher (1639–1684), portraits
- Gerard de Lairesse (1641–1711), historical and biblical paintings
- Aert de Gelder (1645–1727), historical and biblical paintings
- Jan van Huysum (1682–1749), flowers

== Architecture ==
The most famous Dutch architects of the 17th century were :

- Lieven de Key (1560–1627), master builder of Haarlem; still used a fair amount of ornamentation, built De Waag (1598), front of the Town Hall (1597), De Vleeshal (1602–1603), New Church tower (1613), all of which are in Haarlem
- Hendrick de Keyser (1565–1621), preferred a style that was much more sober than his contemporary Lieven de Key, built the Zuiderkerk (1606–1614), the Westerkerk (1620–1638) and the Exchange (1608–1611) in Amsterdam, Town Hall of Delft (1619), several canal houses in Amsterdam (see also section sculpture)
- Jacob van Campen (1595–1657), embraced classicism fully and served as an example for many colleagues, built the Mauritshuis in The Hague (1635), the Dam Palace in Amsterdam (1648–1655), which was originally the town hall, now a royal palace

Less famous architects from this period were:

- Hans Vredeman de Vries (1527–1606), architect in Antwerp, used a lot of ornamentation
- Arent van 's-Gravenzande (..-1662), built De Lakenhal (1639) and the Marekerk (1638–1640), both in Leiden, and the Oostkerk (1646) in Middelburg
- Philip Vingboons (1607–1678), built many canal houses in Amsterdam in classicistic style
- Pieter Post (1608–1669), built Huis ten Bosch in The Hague (1645-)
- Adriaen Dortsman (1625–1682), built the Lutheran Church in Amsterdam
- Elias Bouman (1636–1686), built the Portuguese-Israelitic Synagogue in Amsterdam (1671/1675)
- Maurits Post (1645–1677), built Slot Amerongen (1676)

== Literature ==
The most famous Dutch men of letters of the 17th century were:

- Joost van den Vondel (1587–1679), poet and playwright, who wrote more than 30 plays, many of those based on biblical stories. After The Gijsbrecht (see above) his best known drama is Lucifer (1654). He translated many French, Italian, Latin and Greek works. A recurring theme is man's inner conflicts, on the one hand rebellious, on the other hand pledging obedience to God.
- Gerbrand Adriaensz. Bredero (1585–1618), poet (sonnets) and dramatist (comedies), his most famous comedy, De Spaanse Brabander (English: The Spanish Brabanter), describes the seamy side of life in Amsterdam
- Pieter Corneliszoon Hooft (1581–1647), historian, poet and dramatist, who wrote Nederlandsche Historiën (English: Dutch History), which was never completed, but highly valued. His poetry was of high standard as well. He introduced French and Italian lyricism into Dutch poetry.
- Jacob Cats (1577–1660), poet, famous for his moralistic writings. Houwelijck and Trouringh (English:Marriage and Wedding ring) are two major volumes to educate the Dutch about these serious affairs. Indeed, his all too serious tone, lacking humour and esprit, made him a lesser writer than the three named above, and sometimes the object of mockery. His Kinderen zijn hinderen (English: Children are a nuisance) is still a Dutch saying, often followed by the remark that Cats probably had forgotten that he had been a child himself.

Less famous literary men from this period were:

- Roemer Visscher (1547–1620), writer of epigrams and emblemata
- Karel van Mander (1548–1606), wrote the Schilderboeck, a book about painting, and also several biographies about painters
- Justus de Harduyn (1582–1636), poet from the southern Low Countries
- Samuel Coster (1579–1665), good friend of Bredero, founder of the First Dutch Academy in 1617
- Jacob Revius (1586–1658), poet but worked also on the new bible translation known as the Statenbijbel that appeared in 1637 and is still in use today in some Protestant circles
- Thomas Asseleyn (1620–1701), writer of comedies
- Willem Godschalk van Focquenbroch (1640–1670), poet and playwright
- Jan Luyken (1649–1712)

== Sculpture ==
Dutch sculptors of the 17th century were:

- Hendrick de Keyser (1565–1621), also an architect (see above). He created the Mausoleum for William of Orange in the Nieuwe Kerk (English: New Church) in Delft (1614). All ruling descendants of Willem of Orange and their kin have been interred here to this date. De Keyser also created the statue of Erasmus in Rotterdam (1618)
- Artus I Quellinus (1609–1668), Artus II Quellinus (his nephew) (1625–1700) and Rombout Verhulst (1625–1696). All originating from the southern Netherlands (present day Belgium), they were the most prominent sculptors in the Northern Netherlands. Among their greatest works is the decoration of the Amsterdam city hall (built between 1648 and 1665), now known as the Royal Palace of Amsterdam.

== Music ==
The most famous Dutch composers of the 17th century were:

- Jan P. Sweelinck (1562–1621), composer and organ player, major force in the development of 17th century organ music
- Constantijn Huygens (1596–1687), more famous as a poet, member of the famous chamber of rhetoric De Muiderkring, composed some 800 pieces, most of which got lost, promoted use of the organ during church services

Less famous composers/musicians from this period were:

- Gerbrand Adriaenszoon Bredero (1585-1618), songwriter
- Adrianus Valerius (1570–1625), songwriter
- Jacob van Eyck (1590–1657), composer
- Cornelis Schuyt (1557–1616), composer
- Joan Albert Ban (1597–1644), composer
- Cornelis Padbrué (1592–1670), composer
- Joan Schenk (1660-1712+), composer
- Karel Hacquart (ca 1640-ca 1730), composer
- Pieter and François Hemony (1619–1680; 1609–1667), bell founding brothers and carillon builders

== Exploration ==
- Olivier van Noort (1558–1627), first Dutchman to circumnavigate the world
- Adriaen Block (c. 1567–1627), the first European to enter Long Island Sound and the Connecticut River and determine that Manhattan and Long Island are islands
- Willem Schouten (c. 1567–1625), Dutch explorer, who was first to sail the Cape Horn route to the Pacific Ocean
- Jacob Le Maire (c. 1585–1616), Dutch Flemish explorer
- Abel Janszoon Tasman (1603–1659), the first European to discover New Zealand, Tasmania and Fiji
- Willem Barentsz (c. 1550–1597), explorer of the Arctic
- Cornelis de Houtman (1565–1599), explorer of the East Indies
- Frederick de Houtman (1571–1627), Dutch explorer, elder brother of Cornelis de Houtman
- Willem Janszoon (c. 1570–1630), Dutch navigator and colonial governor, the first European known to have seen the coast of Australia (1606)
- Cornelis Nay, explorer of the Arctic
- Henry Hudson (c. 1565–1611), Englishman who sailed to the Arctic for the Dutch East India Company

== Colonization ==
- Kiliaen van Rensselaer (before 1596–after 1643), co-founder of the Dutch West India Company and first patroon of Rensselaerswyck
- Jan Pieterszoon Coen (1587–1629), Governor-General of the Dutch East Indies
- Peter Stuyvesant (c. 1612–1672), colonial governor of the New Netherland colony
- Jan van Riebeeck (1619–1677), commander of the Cape Colony and founder of Cape Town

== Business ==
- Isaac Le Maire (1558–1624), largest shareholder in the VOC
- Louis De Geer (1587–1652), Walloon/Dutch merchant, considered the father of Swedish industry
- Pieter de la Court (1618–1685), Dutch economist and businessman
- Joseph de la Vega (1650–1692), Amsterdam's Jewish merchant

== Politics ==
- Maurice of Nassau, Prince of Orange (1567–1625), stadtholder
- Frederik Hendrik, Prince of Orange (1584–1647), stadtholder
- Willem III van Oranje (1650–1702), King-Stadtholder
- Johan van Oldenbarnevelt (1547–1619), statesman who played an important role in the Dutch struggle for independence from Spain
- Johan de Witt (1625–1672), Grand Pensionary of Holland, statesman who played an important role in the Republic of the United Netherlands
- Cornelis de Graeff (1599–1664), Amsterdam regent and Dutch statesman who played an important role in the Republic of the United Netherlands; uncle of Johan de Witt
- Andries de Graeff (1611–1678), Amsterdam regent and Dutch statesman; uncle of Johan de Witt
- Andries Bicker (1586-1652), powerful Amsterdam regent and Dutch statesman and diplomat; leader of the Dutch States Party
- Cornelis Bicker (1592-1654), Amsterdam regent; uncle of Johan de Witt
- Agatha Welhouk (1637–1715), central figure in 17th-century court case and daughter of Delft's mayor
- Nicolaes Witsen (1641–1717), Dutch statesman who was mayor of Amsterdam thirteen times, between 1682-1706

== Military ==
- Cornelis Jol (1597–1641), admiral and privateer
- Maarten Tromp (1598–1653), admiral
- Michiel de Ruyter (1607–1676), admiral in the Anglo-Dutch Wars
- Cornelis Tromp (1629–1691), admiral, commander-in-chief of the Dutch and Danish navies
- Cornelius Cruys (1655–1727), Dutch Vice Admiral of the Imperial Russian Navy and the first commander of the Russian Baltic Fleet
