= Aet (given name) =

Female given name

- Gender: Female
- Language: Estonian
- Name day: 5 February

Origin
- Region of origin: Estonia

Other names
- Related names: Agaate, Aita, Ita, Iti

Aet is an Estonian feminine given name, a cognate of Agatha and often a diminutive of the Estonian form, Agaate.

As of 1 January 2021, 271 women in Estonia have the first name Aet, making it the 435th most popular female name in the country. The name is most commonly found in Hiiu County. Individuals bearing the name Aet include:

- Aet Annist (born 1973), social anthropologist
- Aet Laigu, film producer and director
- Aet Maasik (1941–2013), interior architect and restorer
- Aet Maatee (born 1961), cultural organizer, politician and museum director
- Aet Ollisaar (born 1966), textile artist
