= Agafiya =

Agafiya (Russian: Ага́фия) is a Russian Christian female first name. Its colloquial forms are Agafya (Ага́фья; which can also be the main form of a related name) and Ogafya (Ога́фья). Like its traditional English form Agatha, it is derived from the Greek word meaning good, kind, noble.

Agafa can also be a variant of the name Agafiya.

People with the first name

- Agafia of Rus (between 1190 and 1195 – after 2 June 1248), Princess of Masovia
- Agafya (Agafiya) Grushetskaya (1663–1681), Tsaritsa of Russia, wife of Feodor III
- Agafia Lykova (1944- ), a Russian Old Believer, part of the Lykov family, who has lived alone in the taiga for most of her life.
