= Dutch Golden Age =

Period of Dutch history from 1588 to 1672

The Dutch Golden Age (Dutch: Gouden Eeuw [ˈɣʌudən ˈeːu, ˈɣʌudə ˈʔeːu]) was a period in the history of the Netherlands which roughly lasted from 1588, when the Dutch Republic was established, to 1672, when the Rampjaar occurred.

During this period, the Dutch Republic became one of the leading commercial and maritime powers in Europe. With a large merchant fleet and a strong presence in international trade, particularly through Amsterdam, the Republic played an important role in major shipping routes and in the development of modern financial practices, particularly stock exchange trading, joint-stock companies, and public debt markets. Institutions such as the Dutch East India Company helped expand its reach in global commerce. The prosperity of several cities, relatively high income levels, and an active cultural and scientific life made the Dutch Republic an important economic center in the seventeenth century.

Dutch culture flourished during this period as well. However, by the end of the 17th century, conflicts with neighbouring powers as well as declining economic influence led to the end of this period. The process by which the Dutch Republic became one of the foremost maritime and economic powers of the world during the era has been referred to as the "Dutch Miracle" by historian K. W. Swart. The term "Dutch Golden Age" has been controversial in the 21st century due to the extensive Dutch involvement in slavery and colonialism during the period, and it has been deprecated by several museums in the Netherlands, including the Amsterdam Museum.

== Background ==
The Night Watch by Rembrandt (1642)

In 1568, the Seven Provinces that later signed the Union of Utrecht (Dutch: Unie van Utrecht) started a rebellion against Philip II of Spain that led to the Eighty Years' War. Before the Low Countries could be completely reconquered, a war between England and Spain, the Anglo-Spanish War of 1585–1604, broke out. English intervention forced Spanish troops to halt their advances and left them in control of the important trading cities of Bruges and Ghent, but without control of Antwerp, which was then arguably the most important port in the world. Antwerp fell on 17 August 1585, after a siege, and the division between the Northern and Southern Netherlands (the latter mostly modern Belgium) was established.

The United Provinces (roughly today's Netherlands) fought on until the Twelve Years' Truce, which did not end the hostilities. The Peace of Westphalia in 1648, which ended the Eighty Years' War between the Dutch Republic and Spain, and the Thirty Years' War between other European powers, brought the Dutch Republic formal recognition and independence from the Spanish crown.

=== Migration of skilled workers to the Dutch Republic ===
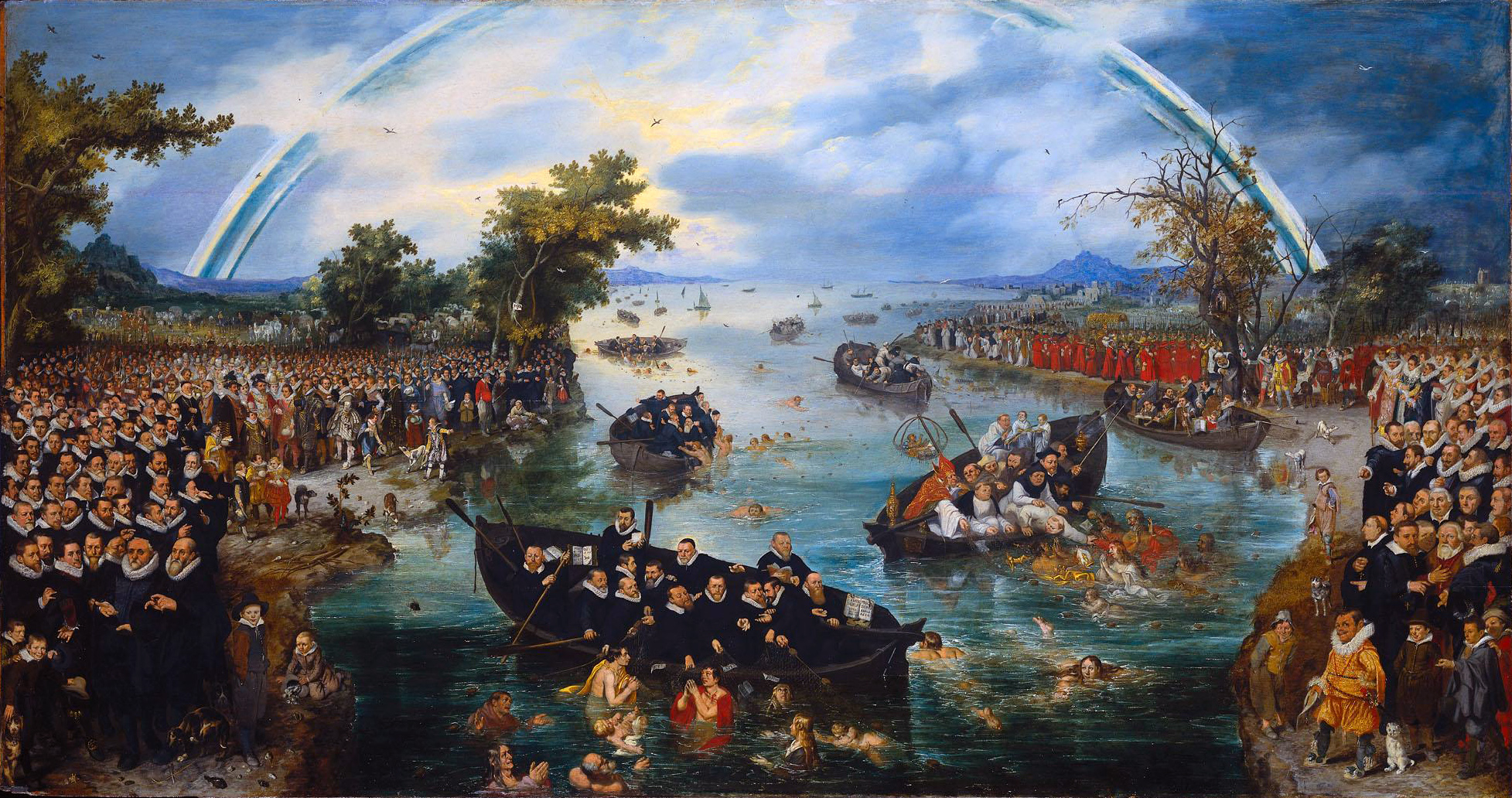
Fishing for Souls, allegory of the Protestant-Catholic struggle

Protestants were especially well-represented among the skilled craftsmen and rich merchants of the port cities of Bruges, Ghent, and Antwerp. Under the terms of the surrender of Antwerp in 1585, the Protestant population (if unwilling to reconvert) were given four years to settle their affairs before leaving the city and Habsburg territory. Similar arrangements were made in other places.

More Protestants moved to the north between 1585 and 1630 than Catholics moved in the other direction, although there were also many of these. Many of those moving north settled in Amsterdam, transforming what was a small harbor into one of the most important ports and commercial centres in the world by 1630.

In addition to the mass migration of Protestant natives from the southern Netherlands to the northern Netherlands, there were also influxes of non-native refugees who had previously fled from religious persecution, particularly Sephardi Jews from Portugal and Spain, and later Protestants from France. The Pilgrim Fathers also spent time there before their voyage to the New World.

=== Protestant work ethic ===
Economists Ronald Findlay and Kevin H. O'Rourke attribute part of the Dutch ascendancy to its Protestant work ethic based on Calvinism, which promoted thrift and education. This contributed to "the lowest interest rates and the highest literacy rates in Europe. The abundance of capital made it possible to maintain an impressive stock of wealth, embodied not only in the large fleet but in the plentiful stocks of an array of commodities that were used to stabilize prices and take advantage of profit opportunities."

=== Cheap energy sources ===
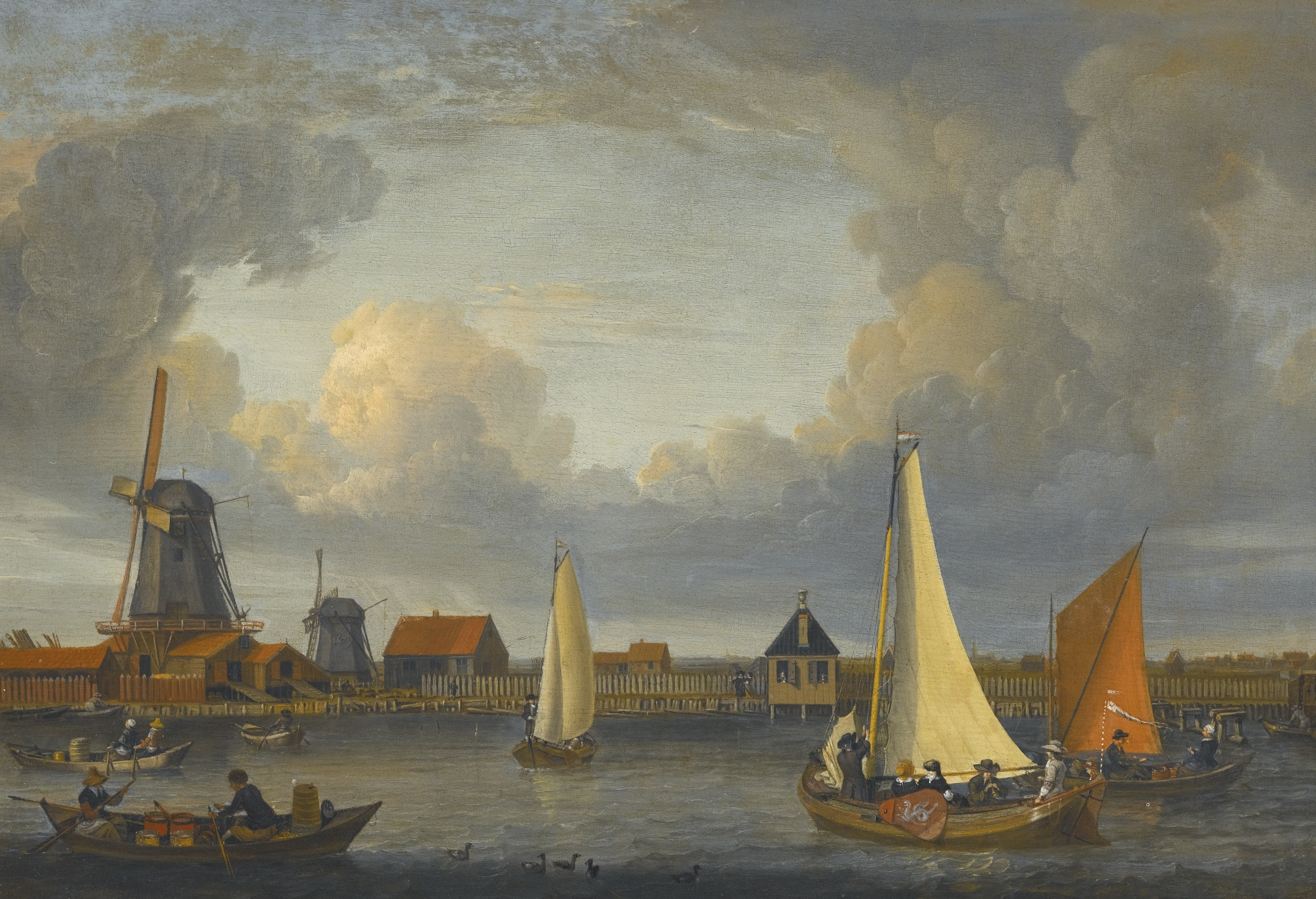
A river landscape with fishermen in rowing boats, windmills beyond, 1679

Several other factors also contributed to the flowering of trade, industry, the arts and the sciences in the Netherlands during this time. A necessary condition was a supply of cheap energy from windmills and from peat, easily transported by canal to the cities. The invention of the wind powered sawmill enabled the construction of a massive fleet of ships for worldwide trading and for military defense of the republic's economic interests.

=== Corporate finance ===
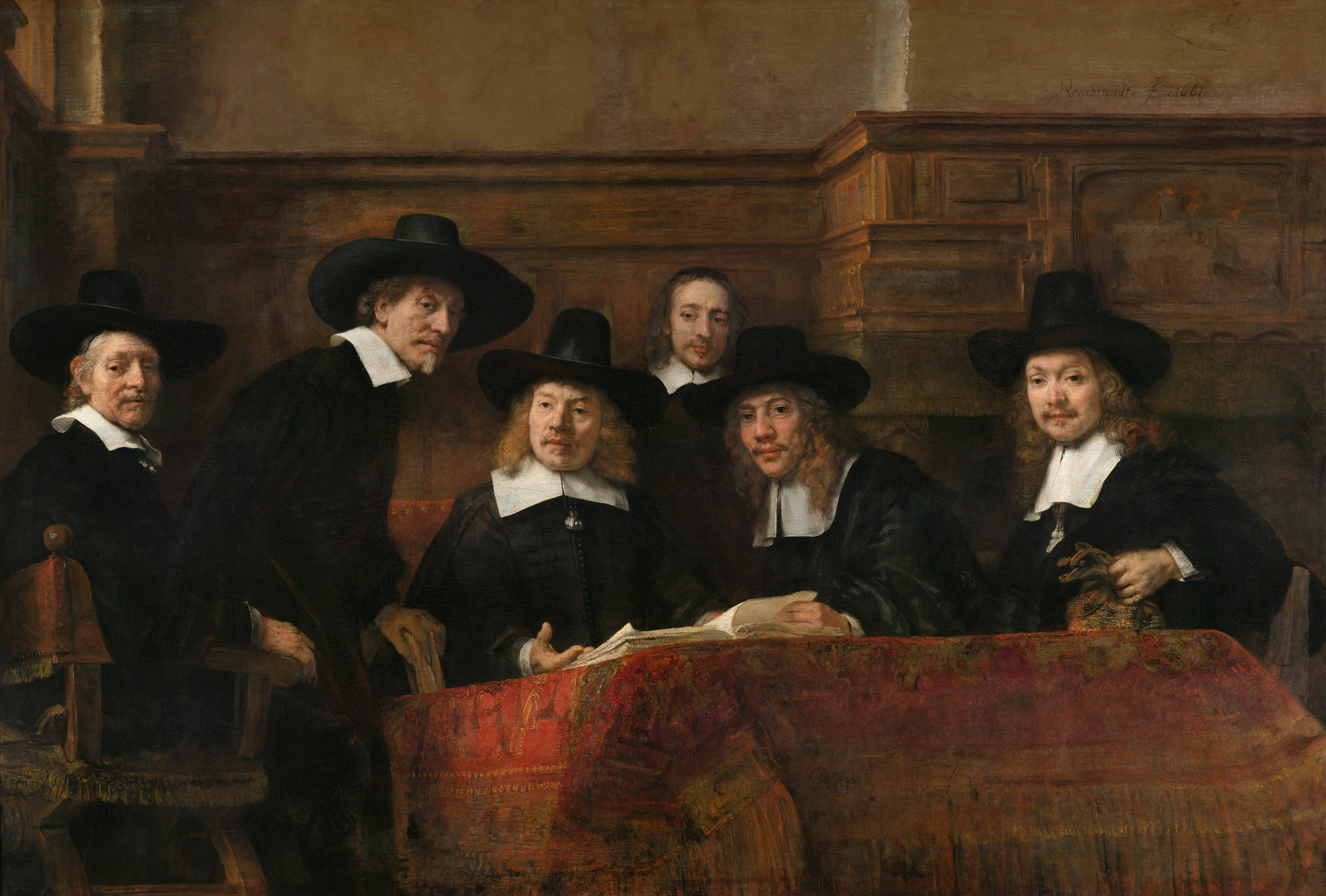
Syndics of the Drapers' Guild by Rembrandt, depicting wealthy Amsterdam burghers

In the 17th century, the Dutch – traditionally able seafarers and keen mapmakers – began to trade with the Far East, and as the century wore on, they gained an increasingly dominant position in world trade, a position previously occupied by the Portuguese and Spanish. The maps used by Fernando Álvarez de Toledo, 3rd Duke of Alba to attack Dutch cities were made by Dutch mapmakers.

In 1602, the Dutch East India Company (VOC) was founded. It was one of the first-ever multinational corporations, financed by shares that established the Amsterdam Stock Exchange. The company received a Dutch monopoly on Asian trade, which it would keep for two centuries, and it became the largest commercial enterprise of the 17th-century world. Spices were imported in bulk and brought huge profits due to the efforts and risks involved and to demand. This is remembered to this day in the Dutch word peperduur, (as expensive as pepper) meaning something is very expensive, reflecting the prices of spices at the time. To finance the growing trade within the region, the Bank of Amsterdam was established in 1609, the precursor to, if not the first true central bank.

Although the trade with the Far East was the more famous of the VOC's exploits, the main source of wealth for the Republic was, in fact, its trade with the Baltic states and Poland (then the Polish–Lithuanian Commonwealth). Called the "Mothertrade" (Dutch: Moedernegotie), the Dutch imported enormous amounts of bulk resources like grain and wood, stockpiling them in Amsterdam so Holland would never lack for basic goods, as well as being able to sell them on for profit. This meant that, unlike their main rivals, the Republic would not face the dire repercussions of a bad harvest and the starvation it accompanied, instead profiting when this happened in other states (bad harvests were commonplace in France and England in the 17th century, which also contributed to the Republic's success in that time).

=== Geography ===
According to Ronald Findlay and Kevin H. O'Rourke, geography favored the Dutch Republic, contributing to its wealth. They write, "The foundations were laid by taking advantage of location, midway between the Bay of Biscay and the Baltic. Seville and Lisbon and the Baltic ports were too far apart for direct trade between the two terminal points, enabling the Dutch to provide profitable intermediation, carrying salt, wine, cloth and later silver, spices, and colonial products eastward while bringing Baltic grains, fish, and naval stores to the west. The Dutch share of European shipping tonnage was enormous, well over half during most of the period of their ascendancy."

== Dutch colonial empire ==
Outside of Europe, the Republic also prospered. The VOC and the Dutch West India Company (GWC) not only obtained a monopoly on the spice trade, their ships also controlled the world's seas. This was very much against the wishes of England, which was envious of the economic success of the Republic. Although they had both fought the Spanish during the Eighty Years War, the two countries were diametrically opposed when the Republic captured a large colonial empire. This led to the Anglo-Dutch Wars.

The prosperity gained from this was accompanied by horrors against the local population. For example, in 1621, Jan Pieterszoon Coen had almost all the inhabitants of the Banda Islands massacred, see Dutch conquest of the Banda Islands.

For a short time, the Republic seemed very successful in Brazil. The Dutch had succeeded in taking the coast between the mouth of the Amazon and the São Francisco (a river south of Recife) from the Portuguese. Under governor John Maurice, Prince of Nassau-Siegen (1637–1644), the lucrative sugar trade was largely in Dutch hands.

Curaçao was conquered in 1634. By 1648, Aruba and Bonaire were also in Dutch hands. A promising colony in North America was New Amsterdam (in present-day New York City).

The role that the Netherlands was able to play in the transatlantic slave trade was the result of a series of conquests against the Portuguese. Trade routes of African slaves in the seventeenth century ran largely through Elmina in Ghana to Brazil and the Caribbean Islands. Elmina was conquered in 1637, Axim in 1642. In 1641, led by Cornelis Jol, Angola was also conquered. It is estimated that more than 550,000 people were brought to America in slavery by Dutch ships. Conditions during these voyages were miserable, and it was commonplace for large numbers of enslaved people to die before they reached their destination. In addition to the personal hardships of enslaved people, the trade also massively disrupted African societies. Estimates of the direct profitability vary, but without slavery the colonization of the Americas would have looked very different.

Asian slaves were also traded extensively. The slave was indispensable in the economy of the Dutch colonial empire in the Golden Age as a labor force; in the second half of the seventeenth century, half of the inhabitants of Batavia were unfree.

== Monopoly on trade with Japan ==
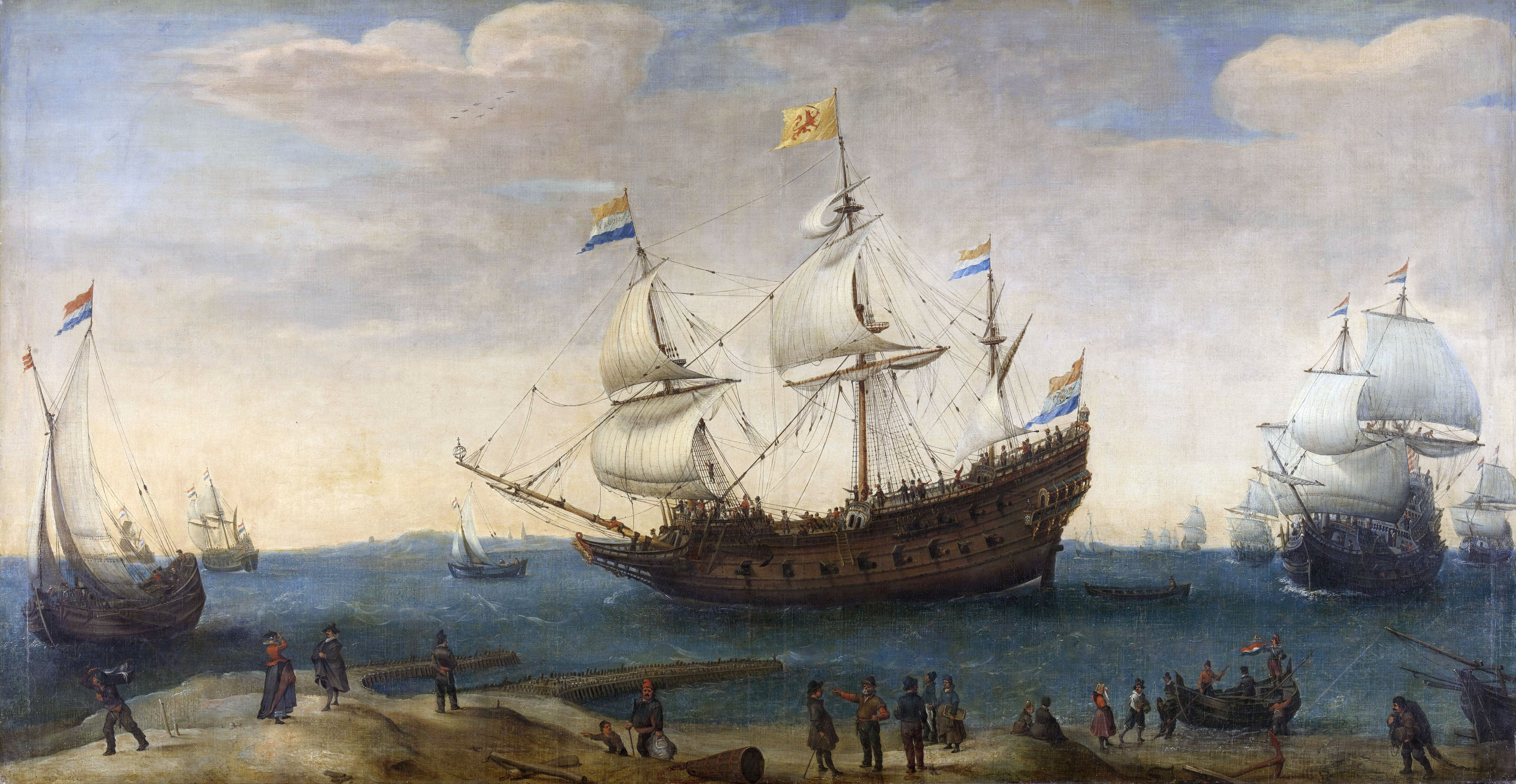
The Dutch had the largest merchant fleet in Europe in the 17th century.

Amsterdam's dominant position as a trade center was strengthened in 1640 with a monopoly for the VOC to trade with Japan through its trading post on Dejima, an island in the bay of Nagasaki. From here the Dutch traded between China and Japan and paid tribute to the shōgun. Until 1854, the Dutch were Japan's sole window to the Western world.

The collection of scientific learning introduced from Europe became known in Japan as Rangaku or Dutch Learning. The Dutch were instrumental in transmitting to Japan some knowledge of the industrial and scientific revolution then occurring in Europe. The Japanese purchased and translated numerous scientific books from the Dutch, obtained from them Western curiosities and manufactures (such as clocks) and received demonstrations of various Western innovations (such as electric phenomena, and the flight of a hot air balloon in the early 19th century). In the 17th and 18th centuries, the Dutch were arguably the most economically wealthy and scientifically advanced of all European nations, which put them in a privileged position to transfer Western knowledge to Japan.

== European great power ==
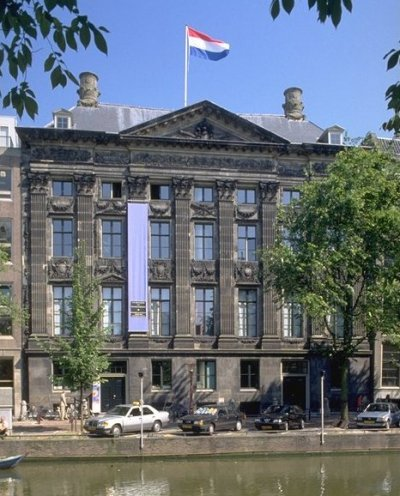
The Trip brothers, arms traders, built the Trippenhuis in Amsterdam, currently the seat of the Royal Netherlands Academy of Arts and Sciences, which is a typical example of 17th-century architecture.

The Dutch also dominated trade between European countries. The Low Countries were favorably positioned at a crossing of east–west and north–south trade routes and connected to a large German hinterland through the Rhine river. Dutch traders shipped wine from France and Portugal to the Baltic lands and returned with grain for countries around the Mediterranean Sea. By the 1680s, an average of nearly 1,000 Dutch ships entered the Baltic Sea each year, to trade with markets of the fading Hanseatic League. The Dutch were able to gain control of much of the trade with the nascent English colonies in North America; and after the end of the war with Spain in 1648, Dutch trade with that country also flourished.

== Other industries ==
National industries expanded as well. Shipyards and sugar refineries are prime examples. As more and more land was utilized, partially through transforming lakes into polders such as the Beemster, Schermer, and Purmer, local grain production and dairy farming soared.

== Social structure ==
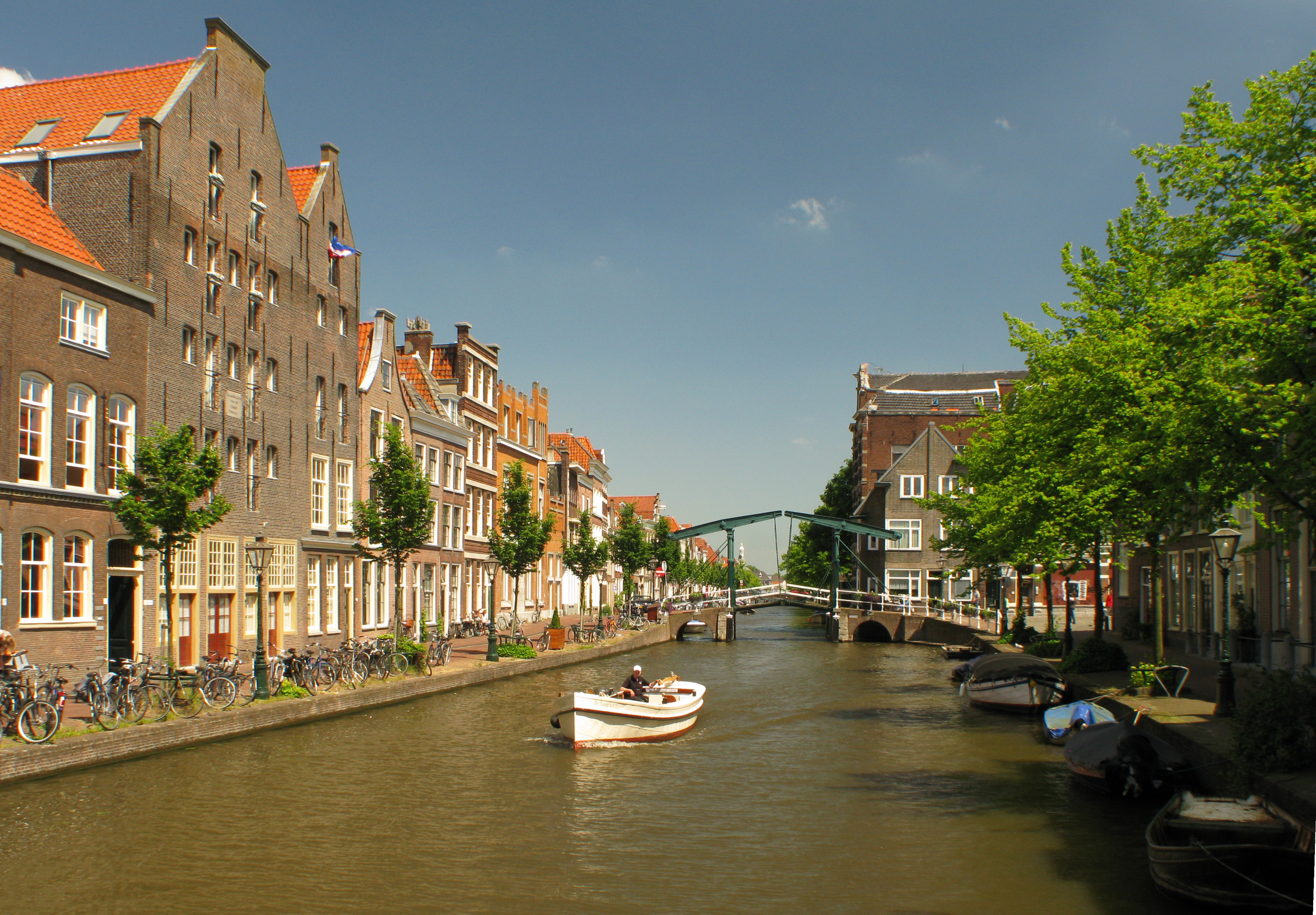
Canal in Leiden

In the 17th-century Netherlands, social status was largely determined by income. The landed nobility had relatively little importance, since they mostly lived in the more underdeveloped inland provinces, and it was the urban merchant class that dominated Dutch society. The clergy did not have much worldly influence either: the Catholic Church had been more or less suppressed since the onset of the Eighty Years' War with Spain. The new Protestant movement was divided, although exercising social control in many areas to an even greater extent than under the Catholic Church.

That is not to say that aristocrats were without social status. On the contrary, wealthy merchants bought themselves into the nobility by becoming landowners and acquiring a coat of arms and a seal. Aristocrats also mixed with other classes for financial reasons: they married their daughters to wealthy merchants, became traders themselves or took up public or military office. Merchants also started to value public office as a means to greater economic power and prestige. Universities became career pathways to public office. Rich merchants and aristocrats sent their sons on a so-called Grand Tour through Europe. Often accompanied by a private tutor, preferably a scientist himself, these young people visited universities in several European countries. This intermixing of patricians and aristocrats was most prominent in the second half of the century.

After aristocrats and patricians came the affluent middle class, consisting of Protestant ministers, lawyers, physicians, small merchants, industrialists, and clerks of large state institutions. Lower status was attributed to farmers, craft and tradesmen, shopkeepers, and government bureaucrats. Below that stood skilled laborers, maids, servants, sailors, and other persons employed in the service industry. At the bottom of the pyramid were "paupers": impoverished peasants, many of whom tried their luck in a city as a beggar or day laborer.

Workers and laborers were generally paid better than in most of Europe, and enjoyed relatively high living standards, although they also paid higher than normal taxes. Farmers prospered from mainly cash crops needed to support the urban and seafaring population.

=== Women's roles ===
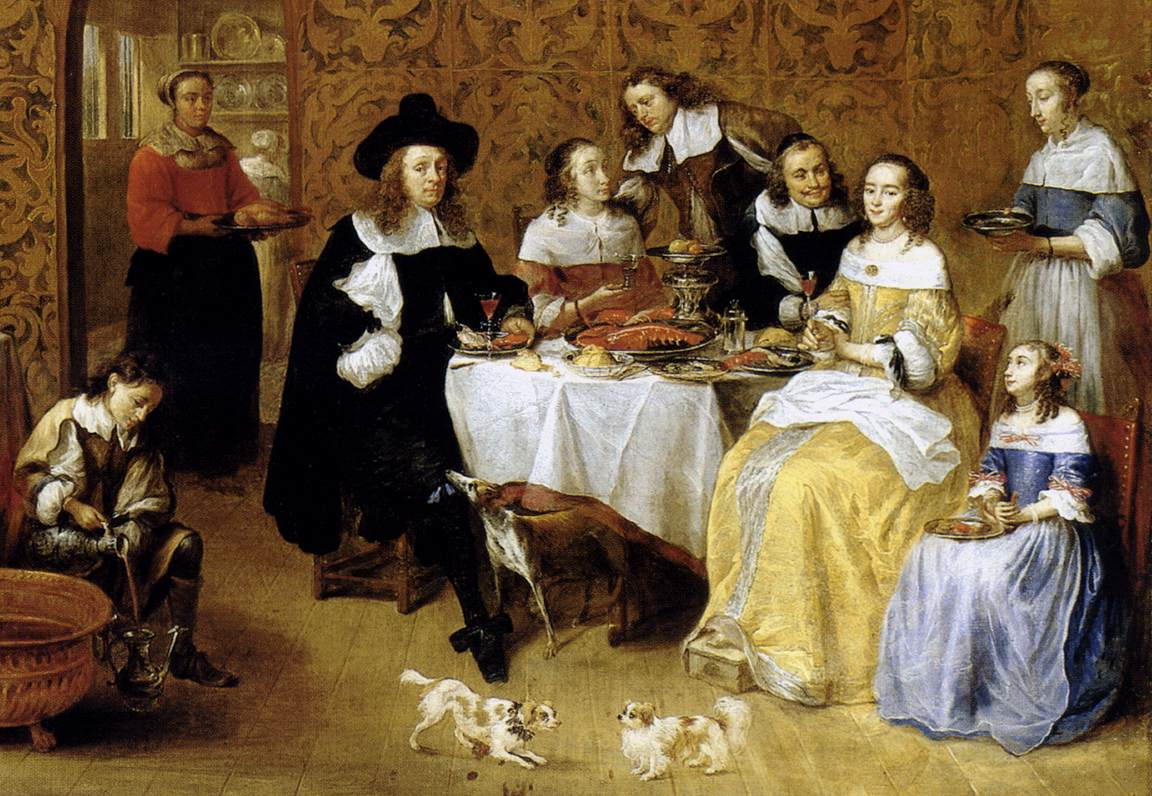
A family portrait, second half of the 17th century

The central role of women in the 17th-century Dutch household revolved around the home and domestic tasks. In Dutch culture, the home was regarded as a safe-haven from the lack of Christian virtue and immorality of the outside world. Additionally, the home represented a microcosm of the Dutch Republic, in that the smooth running of an ideal household reflected the relative stability and prosperity of the government. The home was an integral part of public life in Dutch society. Public passers-by could clearly view the entrance halls of Dutch homes decorated to show off a particular family's wealth and social standing. The home was also a place for neighbors, friends, and extended family to interact, further cementing its importance in the social lives of 17th-century Dutch burghers. The physical space of the Dutch home was constructed along gender lines. In the front of the house, the men had control over a small space where they could do their work or conduct business, known as the Voorhuis, while women controlled most every other space in the house, such as the kitchens and private family rooms. Although there was a clear separation in spheres of power between husband and wife (the husband had authority in the public realm, the wife in the domestic and private), women in 17th-century Dutch society still enjoyed a wide range of freedoms within their own sphere of control. Unmarried young women were known to enjoy various freedoms with their lovers and suitors, while married women enjoyed the right to publicly shame their husbands who patronized brothels. Moreover, married women could legally reject the sexual desires of their husbands if there were proof or reason to believe that a sexual encounter would result in the transmission of syphilis or other venereal diseases. Dutch women were also allowed to take communion alongside men, and widows were able to inherit property and maintain control over their finances and husband's wills. However, a woman's sphere of authority still primarily lay in household duties, though historical evidence exists showing certain cases of wives maintaining considerable control in family businesses. Manuals written by men instructing women and wives in various aspects of domestic duties proliferated, the most popular being Jacob Cats' Houwelyck. As evidenced by numerous 17th-century Dutch genre paintings, the most important domestic tasks performed by women included supervising maids, cooking, cleaning, needlework, and spinning.

==== Unmarried women ====
The Dancing Couple, by Jan Steen, 1663

As seen in art and literature at the time, unmarried young women were valued for maintaining their modesty and diligence as this time in a woman's life was regarded to be the most precarious. From a young age, burgher women were taught various household-related duties by their mothers, including reading, so as to prepare them for their lives as housewives. Dutch art at this time shows the idealized situation in which an unmarried young girl ought to conduct herself in situations such as courtship, which commonly included themes relating to gardens or nature, music lessons or parties, needlework, and receiving love letters. However, ideals of the young women espoused by genre painting and Petrarchian poetry did not reflect the reality. Accounts from travellers described the various freedoms young women were provided in the realm of courtship. The prevalence of Calvinist sermons regarding the consequences of leaving young women unsupervised also spoke to a general trend of a lack of parental oversight in the matters of young love.

==== Married women and mothers ====
Dutch writers, such as Jacob Cats, held the prevailing public opinion concerning marriage. He and other cultural authorities were influenced by Calvinist ideals that stressed an equality between husband and wife, considered companionship a primary reason for marriage, and regarded procreation as a mere consequence of that companionship. However, non-egalitarian ideas still existed regarding women as the weaker sex, and the image of the turtle was commonly used to express the separate spheres and strengths of both genders. In addition to supervising maids, cooking, cleaning, and prating needlework, women were also encouraged to maintain some financial control over domestic affairs, such as going to market and buying their own food.

Maternity and motherhood were highly valued in Dutch culture. Mothers were encouraged to breastfeed their children, as using a wet nurse would prevent a bond from forming between mother and child. The Dutch believed that a mother's milk came from the blood originally in her womb and that feeding the infant such substances would also reap physiological and health related benefits. Seventeenth-century Dutch society dictated that children should first begin to learn religion at home. Therefore, along with their husbands, women used family meal times to discuss religious topics and to focus on prayer.

==== Old women and widows ====
17th-century Dutch culture maintained contradictory attitudes regarding the elderly, in particular, elderly women. Some Dutch writers idealized old age as a poetic transition from life to death. Others regarded aging as an illness in which one is gradually deteriorating until they reach their final destination, while some lauded the elderly as wise and people who deserve the highest forms of respect. However, treatises on behaviour for elderly women and widows stressed not necessarily their inherent wisdom, but that they should maintain piety, practice moderation, and live a relatively secluded life. Unlike other European artistic traditions, Dutch art rarely depicts elderly women as disgusting or grotesque creatures, but rather they are idolized as figures of piety and purity whom the younger generations of women can look up to.

== Religion ==
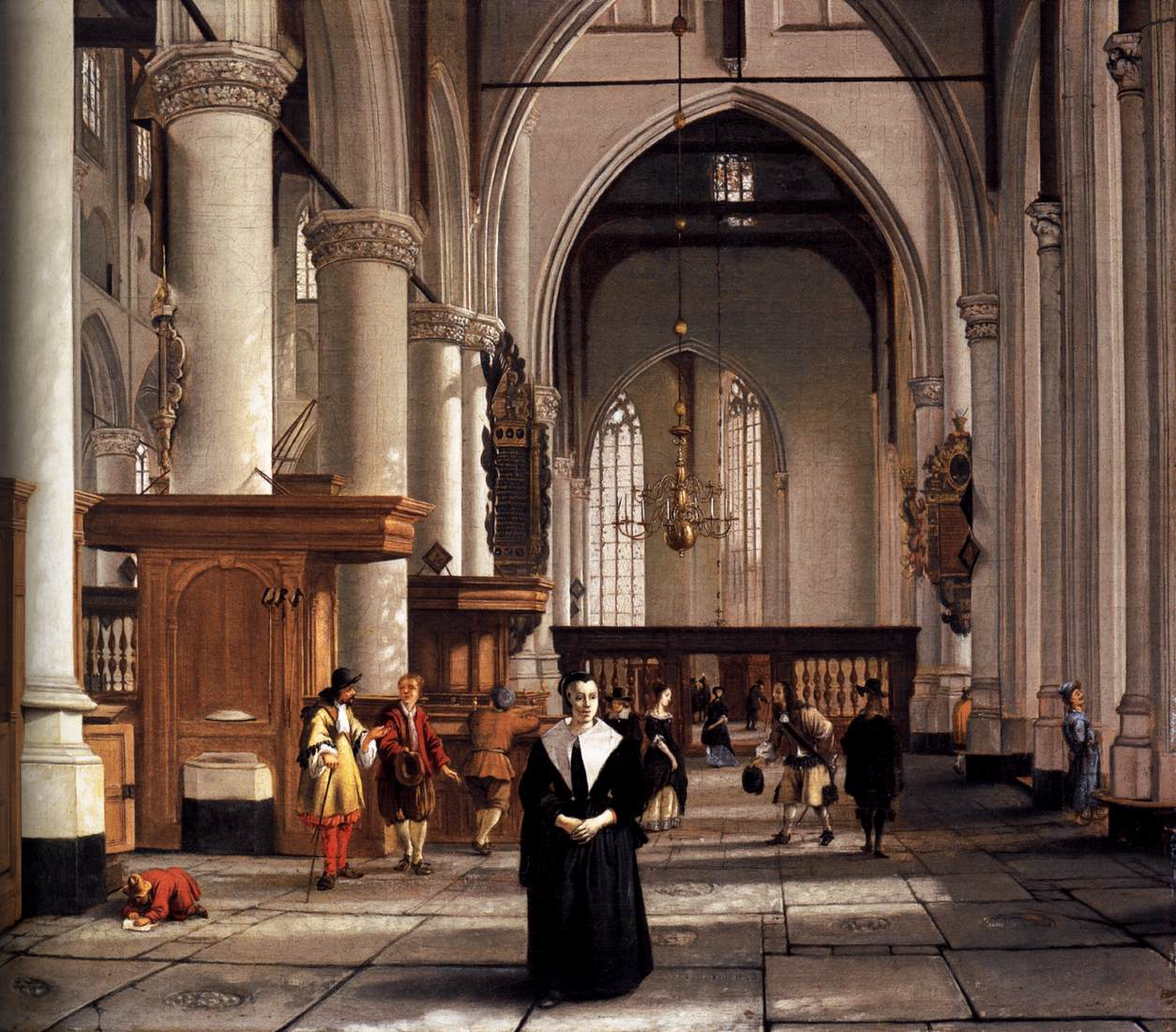
Interior of the Laurenskerk in Rotterdam, c. 1664

Calvinism was the state religion in the Dutch Republic, though this does not mean that unity existed. Although the Netherlands was a tolerant nation compared to neighboring states, wealth and social status belonged almost exclusively to Protestants. The cities with a predominantly Catholic background, such as Utrecht and Gouda, did not enjoy the benefits of the Golden Age. As for the Protestant towns, unity of belief was also far from standard. At the beginning of the century bitter controversies between strict Calvinists and more permissive Protestants, known as Remonstrants, split the country. The Remonstrants denied predestination and championed freedom of conscience, while their more dogmatic adversaries (known as Contra-Remonstrants) gained a major victory at the Synod of Dort (1618–19). The variety of sects may well have worked to make religious intolerance impractical.

Renaissance Humanism, of which Desiderius Erasmus (c. 1466–1536) was an important advocate, had also gained a firm foothold and was partially responsible for a climate of tolerance.

Tolerance towards Catholics was not so easy to uphold, as religion had played an important part in the Eighty Years' War of independence against Spain (with political and economic freedom being other important motives). Intolerant inclinations, however, could be overcome by money. Thus Catholics could buy the privilege of holding ceremonies in a conventicle (a house doubling inconspicuously as a church), but public offices were out of the question. Catholics tended to keep to themselves in their own section of each town, even though they were one of the largest single denominations: for example, the Catholic painter Johannes Vermeer lived in the "Papist corner" of the town of Delft. The same applied to Anabaptists and Jews.

Overall, the country was tolerant enough to attract religious refugees from other countries, notably Jewish merchants from Portugal who brought much wealth with them. The revocation of the Edict of Nantes in France in 1685 resulted in the immigration of many French Huguenots, many of whom were shopkeepers or scientists. However, some figures, such as the philosopher Baruch Spinoza (1632–1677), experienced social stigma.

== Science ==
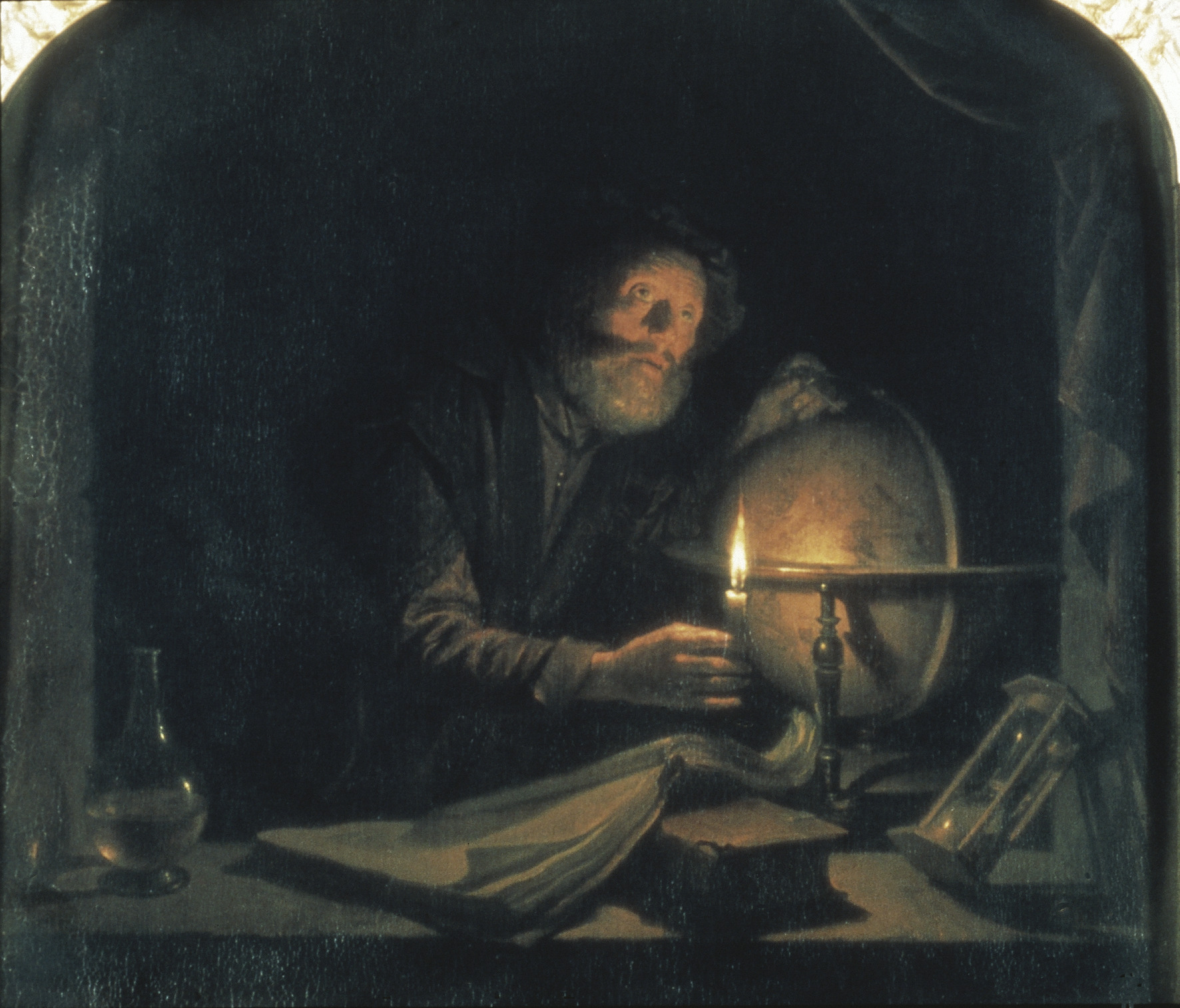
Astronomer, by Gerrit Dou, c. 1650

Due to its climate of intellectual tolerance, the Dutch Republic attracted scientists and other thinkers from all over Europe. In particular, the University of Leiden (established in 1575 by the Dutch stadtholder Willem van Oranje as a token of gratitude for Leiden's fierce resistance against Spain during the Eighty Years' War) became a gathering place for intellectuals. Jan Amos Comenius, the Czech educator and writer, was known for his theories of education, but also as a pioneer of Czech Protestantism during the 17th century. To escape the Counter-Reformation, he migrated to the Dutch Republic and is buried in Naarden, North Holland. Comenius accepted the invitation of Laurens de Geer to visit Amsterdam, where he lived the last 14 years of his life (1656–1670). He published his most important works there: 43 volumes in all, about half of his total output. French philosopher and mathematician René Descartes (1596–1650) lived in Holland from 1628 until 1649. He also had his most important works published in Amsterdam and Leiden. Another French-born philosopher, Pierre Bayle, left France in 1681 for the Dutch Republic, where he became a professor of history and philosophy at the Illustrious School of Rotterdam. He lived in Rotterdam until his death in 1706. As Bertrand Russell noted in his A History of Western Philosophy (1945), "He [Descartes] lived in Holland for twenty years (1629–49), except for a few brief visits to France and one to England, all on business. It is impossible to exaggerate the importance of Holland in the 17th century, as the one country where there was freedom of speculation. Hobbes had to have his books printed there; Locke took refuge there during the five worst years of reaction in England before 1688; Bayle (of the Dictionary) found it necessary to live there; and Spinoza would hardly have been allowed to do his work in any other country."

Dutch lawyers were famous for their knowledge of international law of the sea and commercial law. Hugo Grotius (1583–1645) played a leading part in the foundation of international law. He invented the concept of the "Free seas" or Mare liberum, which was fiercely contested by England, the Netherlands' main rival for domination of world trade. He also formulated laws on conflicts between nations in his book De jure Belli ac pacis ("On the law of war and peace").

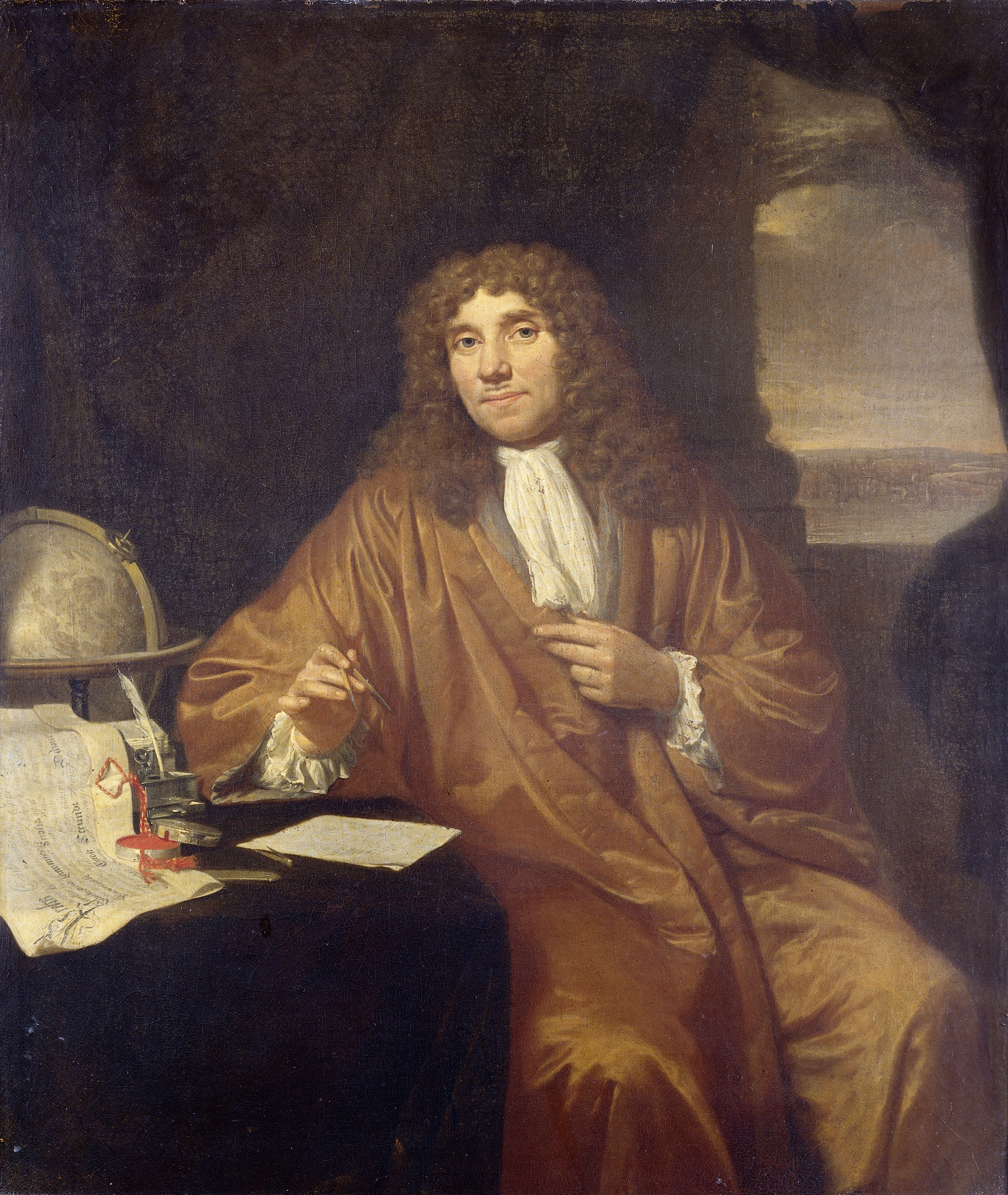
Portrait of Antonie van Leeuwenhoek by Jan Verkolje

Christiaan Huygens (1629–1695) was a famous astronomer, physicist, and mathematician. He invented the pendulum clock, which was a major step forward towards exact timekeeping. Among his contributions to astronomy was his explanation of Saturn's planetary rings. He also contributed to the field of optics. The most famous Dutch scientist in the area of optics is Antonie van Leeuwenhoek, who was the first to methodically study microscopic life—he was the first person to describe bacteria—thus laying the foundations for the field of microbiology. The "microscopes" were simple magnifiers, not compound microscopes. His skill in grinding lenses (some as small as 1mm in diameter) resulted in a magnification as high as 245x.

Famous Dutch hydraulic engineer Jan Leeghwater (1575–1650) gained important victories in the Netherlands' eternal battle against the sea. Leeghwater added a considerable amount of land to the republic by converting several large lakes into polders, pumping the water out with windmills.

== Culture ==
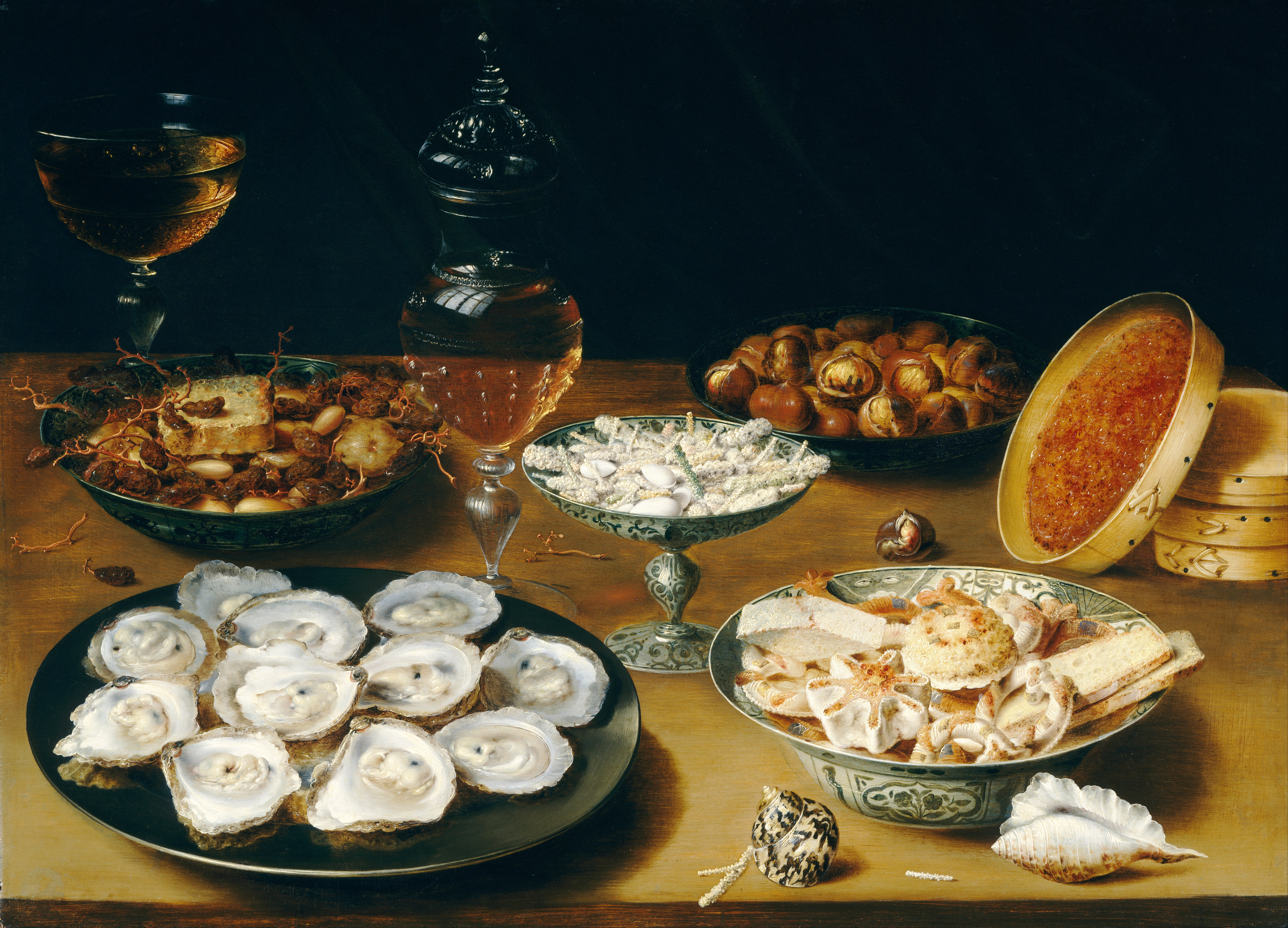
Osias Beert the Elder, Dishes with Oysters, Fruit, Candy, and Wine, c. 1620/1625

Cultural development in the Low Countries stood out from neighboring countries. With some exceptions (notably Dutch playwright Joost van den Vondel) the Baroque movement did not gain much influence. Its exuberance did not fit the austerity of the largely Calvinistic population. The major force behind new developments was the citizenry, notably in the western provinces: first and foremost in Holland, to a lesser extent Zeeland and Utrecht. Where rich aristocrats often became patrons of art in other countries, because of their comparative absence in the Netherlands this role was played by wealthy merchants and other patricians.

Centres of cultural activity were town militia (Dutch: schutterij) and chambers of rhetoric (rederijkerskamer). The former were created for town defence and policing, but also served as a meeting-place for the well-to-do, who were proud to play a prominent part and paid well to see this preserved for posterity by means of a group portrait. The latter were associations at a city level that fostered literary activities, like poetry, drama and discussions, often through contests. Cities took pride in their associations and promoted them.

In the Dutch Golden Age, the meals of the middle class consisted of a rich variety of dishes. During the 15th century haute cuisine began to emerge, largely limited to the aristocracy, but from the 17th century onward dishes of this kind became available to the wealthy citizens as well. The Dutch Empire enabled spices, sugar, and exotic fruits to be imported to the country. By the late 17th century, tea and coffee consumption were increasing and becoming part of everyday life. Tea was served with sweets, candy or marzipan and cookies. A rich Dutch mealtime of the time contained many extravagant dishes and drinks.

The elite wore black clothes as a status symbol. This status originated from the difficulty of the dyeing process and the cost of elaborate embellishments, and is contrary to the popular belief that it was done exclusively out of Puritan self-restraint.

=== Painting ===
Johannes Vermeer's Girl with a Pearl Earring, c. 1665

Dutch Golden Age painting followed many of the tendencies that dominated Baroque art in other parts of Europe, such as Caravaggism and naturalism, but was the leader in developing the subjects of still life, landscape, and genre painting. Portraiture was also popular, but history painting – traditionally the most-elevated genre – struggled to find buyers. Church art was virtually non-existent, and little sculpture of any kind was produced. While art collecting and painting for the open market was also common elsewhere, art historians point to the growing number of wealthy Dutch middle-class and successful mercantile patrons as driving forces in the popularity of certain pictorial subjects.

This trend, along with the lack of Counter-Reformation church patronage that dominated the arts in Catholic Europe, resulted in the great number of "scenes of everyday life" or genre paintings, and other secular subjects. Landscapes and seascapes, for example, reflect the land reclaimed from the sea and the sources of trade and naval power that mark the Republic's Golden Age. One subject that is quite characteristic of Dutch Baroque painting is the large group portrait, especially of civic and militia guilds, such as Rembrandt van Rijn's Night Watch. A special genre of still life was the so-called pronkstilleven (Dutch for 'ostentatious still life'). This style of ornate still-life painting was developed in the 1640s in Antwerp by Flemish artists such as Frans Snyders, Osias Beert, Adriaen van Utrecht and a whole generation of Dutch Golden Age painters. They painted still lifes that emphasized abundance by depicting a diversity of objects, fruits, flowers and dead game, often together with living people and animals. The style was soon adopted by artists from the Dutch Republic.

Today, the best-known painters of the Dutch Golden Age are the period's most dominant figure Rembrandt, the Delft master of genre Johannes Vermeer, the innovative landscape painter Jacob van Ruisdael, and Frans Hals, who infused new life into portraiture. Some notable artistic styles and trends include Haarlem Mannerism, Utrecht Caravaggism, the School of Delft, the Leiden fijnschilders, and Dutch classicism.

=== Architecture ===
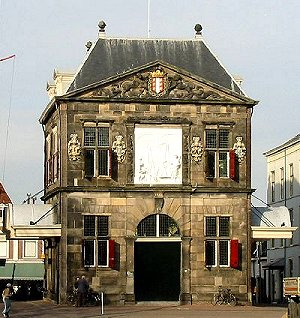
The Kaaswaag (Cheese Weigh House) in Gouda, finished in 1667, was designed by architect Pieter Post (1608–1669), as was the Waag in Leiden.

Dutch architecture was taken to a new height in the Golden Age. Cities expanded greatly as the economy thrived. New town halls, weighhouses and storehouses were built. Merchants who had made their fortune ordered a new house along one of the many new canals that were dug out in and around many cities (for defense and transport purposes), a house with an ornamented façade that befitted their new status. In the countryside, many new castles and stately homes were built; but most of them have not survived.

Early in the 17th century, late Gothic elements still prevailed, combined with Renaissance motifs. After a few decades French classicism gained prominence: vertical elements were stressed, less ornamentation was used, and natural stone was preferred above bricks. In the last decades of the century this trend towards sobriety intensified. From around 1670 the most prominent feature of a house front was its entrance, with pillars on each side and possibly a balcony above it, but no further decoration.

Starting at 1595, Reformed churches were commissioned, many of which are still landmarks today.

The most famous Dutch architects of the 17th century were Jacob van Campen, Pieter Post, Philips Vingboons, Lieven de Key, and Hendrick de Keyser.

=== Sculpture ===
Dutch achievements in sculpture in the 17th century are less prominent than in painting and architecture, and fewer examples were created than in neighbouring countries, partly because of their absence in the interiors of Protestant churches, as objections to the Roman Catholic veneration of statues had been one of the contentious points of the Reformation. Another reason was the comparatively small class of nobles. Sculptures were commissioned for government buildings, private buildings (often adorning house fronts) and the exteriors of churches. There was also a market for grave monuments and portrait busts.

Hendrick de Keyser, who was active at the dawn of the Golden Age, is one of the few prominent home-grown sculptors. In the 1650s and 1660s, the Flemish sculptor Artus I Quellinus, along with his family and followers like Rombout Verhulst, were responsible for the classicizing decorations for the Amsterdam city hall (now the Royal Palace, Amsterdam). This remains the major monument of Dutch Golden Age sculpture.

=== Literature ===
The Golden Age was also an important time for developments in literature. Some of the major figures of this period were Gerbrand Bredero, Jacob Cats, Pieter Hooft, and Joost van den Vondel.

During this time, a climate of tolerance developed in comparison to other European states with strict censorship restrictions paving the way for the Dutch to become a powerhouse in the book trade. This transformation is described by modern historians as the 'Dutch miracle.' Additionally, the Dutch enjoyed high literacy rates, and Dutch entrepreneurs took advantage of this. As a result, seventeenth-century Holland became a great centre for the production of news, Bibles, political pamphlets. Louis Elzevir and his descendants created what is considered one of the most eminent dynasties of the book trade. The House of Elzevir produced pocket editions of classical Latin texts which were scholarly, reliable, and reasonably priced. The Elzevir dynasty died out in 1712 and the 'Dutch miracle' waned as international competition caught up to the Dutch book trade.

== Controversy ==
The term "Dutch Golden Age" became a source of controversy during the 21st century due to the extensive Dutch involvement in slavery during this period; approximately 1.7 million people were enslaved by Dutch slavers from the 17th to 19th centuries as part of the Atlantic and Indian Ocean slave trades. In a 2019 exhibition at the Amsterdam Museum, the museum announced it would stop using the phrase, with its artistic director Margriet Schavemaker stating that "the Golden Age is, in a way, the story of the winners, and it hides the colonial past of [the Netherlands]. It hides slavery, but also it covers up poverty more generally. Not everyone participated in the Golden Age, not at all." The museum's announcement was met with criticism, including from Dutch Prime Minister Mark Rutte and politician Michel Rog. In contrast, Curaçaoan activist and artist Quinsy Gario wrote that "Most people [in the Netherlands] understand the Golden Age is a wrong term".

== See also ==
- Dutch Golden Age painting
- Golden Age of Flanders
- First Stadtholderless Period
- Flemish painting
- List of people from the Dutch Golden Age
- Tulip mania
- Vermeer's Hat: The Seventeenth Century and the Dawn of the Global World

== References and further reading ==
- Cook, Harold (2007). Matters of Exchange: Commerce, Medicine, and Science in the Dutch Golden Age. New Haven, CT: Yale University Press.
- Freist, Dagmar (2010). "The "Dutch Century"". European History Online. Mainz: Institute of European History.
- Helmers, Helmer J. and Geert H. Janssen, eds. The Cambridge Companion to the Dutch Golden Age (Cambridge University Press, 2018) 428 pp online review
- Hoftijzer, Paul G., The Dutch Republic, Centre of the European Book Trade in the 17th Century, EGO - European History Online, Mainz: Institute of European History, 2015, retrieved: March 8, 2020 (pdf).
- Margócsy, Dániel. Commercial Visions: Science, Trade, and Visual Culture in the Dutch Golden Age (University of Chicago Press, 2014).
- Schama, Simon (1987). The Embarrassment of Riches: An Interpretation of Dutch Culture in the Golden Age. New York: Alfred Knopf.
- de Vries, Jan; van der Woude, Ad (2010). The First Modern Economy: Success, failure, and perseverance of the Dutch economy, 1500–1815. Cambridge University Press. ISBN 978-0-521-57825-7.
