= Agafa =

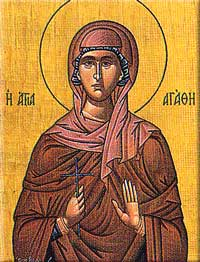
- Orthodox icon of St Agatha
- Gender: Female
- Language: Russian

Origin
- Origin: Ancient Greek

Other names
- Related names: Agatha

Agafa (Russian: Ага́фа) is an old and uncommon Russian female first name. It is derived from the Greek word αγαθή, meaning kind, good. It can also be a variant of the name Agafiya. The name was included int various, often handwritten, church calendars throughout the 17th–19th centuries, but was omitted from the official Synodal Menologium at the end of the 19th century.

The diminutives of "Agafa" are Agafochka (Ага́фочка), Gafa (Га́фа), and Aga (А́га).
