= Agafya =

Agafya (Russian: Ага́фья) is a Russian female given name. Its colloquial forms are Agafiya, Agafia, and Ogafya. Notable people include:

- Agafya Grushetskaya (born 1663), Tsaritsa of Russia
- Agafya Kuzmenko (born 1897), Ukrainian teacher
- Agafia Lykova (born 1944), Russian Old Believer
- Agafia of Rus (born between 1190 and 1195), Princess of Mazovia

== See also ==
- Agatha
- Agafiya
- Ogafya
