= Katherina Hetzeldorfer =

Executed German female homosexual

Katherina Hetzeldorfer (died 1477) was recorded as the first woman to be executed for female homosexuality. She was drowned in the Rhine in Speyer.

== Life ==
Originally from Nuremberg, she had moved to Speyer in 1475 dressed as a man in the company of a woman she described as her sister. In 1477, she was prosecuted after having been reported by someone to whom she had confided that she and his sister lived as man and wife. The exact crime she was charged with is not specified in the legal proceedings. It was discovered that she also had bought sex from two women, both of whom claimed not to have known her biological sex even during intercourse, one of them stating that she had used a strap-on dildo made with red leather. Hetzeldorfer was executed by drowning in the Rhine River.

There is no earlier record of executions for female homosexuality (while executions for male homosexual acts, or sodomy, were common) and a very limited number of later cases, even though female homosexuality was also considered a "crime against nature". Later executions for female homosexuality in Europe include those of Catherine de la Manière and Françoise de l'Estrage, in 1537 in France, and a famous case of persecution was that of Agatha Dietschi in 1547.

== See also ==
- Female sodomy
