= Agatha Kwon Chin-i =

Korean Catholic saint (1820–1840)

Saint Agatha Kwon Chin-i
- Born: 1820
- Died: 1840 (aged 19–20); Yongsan District, Seoul, Joseon
- Venerated in: Roman Catholic Church
- Canonized: 1984 by John Paul II
- Major shrine: Danggogae Martyrs’ Shrine
- Feast: September 20

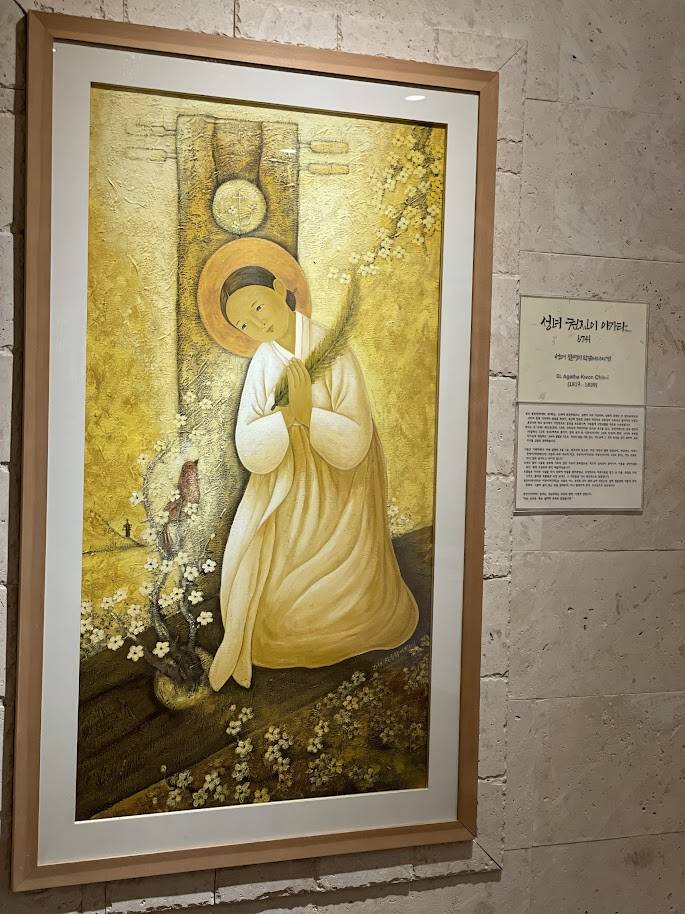
Photo of Agathe Kwon Chin

Agatha Kwon Chin-i (Korean: 아가타 권진이; Hanja: 權珍伊; 1820–1840) is a Korean Catholic saint, one of the 103 Korean Martyrs.

== Biography ==
She was born in 1820, to a government official and his wife, St. Magdalene Han Yong-i, who was martyred on December 29, 1839. Agatha was married at a young age, about 12 or 13 years old, but her husband was too poor to care for her, so she lived with her relatives. Agatha worked as a housekeeper for Chinese priest Yu Pang-che Pacificus during his visit to Korea; on her request, he had her marriage annulled "so that she could be a virgin". Yu returned to China after rumors spread about their relationship, and although they subsided, she "was repentant and determined to make up for it by offering herself as a martyr to God".

When Agatha was 21, she was arrested with her mother and two young Catholic women, St. Agatha Yi Kyong-i and a servant girl; she and her mother were separated and the women were placed under house arrest in Seoul, under the surveillance of a guard. An "apostate Christian" offered Agatha freedom if she went away with him and threatened her if she refused; when she rejected him, the guards became sympathetic towards her and helped all three women escape. The servant girl, however, was re-captured, and told her captors where the other women were hiding; they were re-arrested and the guards who helped them escape were punished by their superiors.

Both women refused to deny their faith despite "many severe tortures"; Agatha was brutally beaten on her legs in court. She visited her mother one last time in prison before her mother's execution. Agatha was also able to send a letter, which was "full of fervent affection and obedience to God's Will", to a friend. Agatha was beheaded a month later, on January 31, 1840, in Danggogae in what is now the Yongsan district of Seoul, with five other Catholics.

== Legacy ==
The Korean bishops said of Agatha: "This young Korean woman offered God more tears and more fragrant perfume than Mary Magdalene of Jesus' time".

St. Agatha was part of the persecution of Catholics in Korea that took place over the course of 100 years. Up to 10,000 Catholics were martyred for their faith because they were perceived as a threat to local Confucian ideals, over five main waves of persecution. She was executed during "the infamous 1839–1840 Gihae Persecution", with a group of ten prisoners, including St. Mary Yi Seong-rye.

Nine of the Danggogae martyrs, including St. Agatha, were canonized by Pope John Paul II in 1984, when he canonized 103 martyrs and French missionaries killed during the waves of persecutions in Korea. There is a shrine dedicated to the martyrs at Danggogae, which honors the third-highest number of martyred saints in Korea.
