= Theard Aladin =

Theard Aladin (October 12, 1925 – August 17, 1993) was a Haitian self-taught artist, noted for his artwork depicting Haitian life and use of bright colors in paintings.

== Biography ==
Aladin was from Jacmel, a city on the southern coast of Haiti. After working as a stonemason and farmer for many years, Aladin suffered a serious back injury in 1983, which left him unable to continue this line of work. For months he supported his family by doing odd jobs around Jacmel, but in fall of 1984, he had a dream in which he was told that he was an artist. The very next day, he began his first painting. Shortly thereafter, Aladin moved to a house in Carrefour, a commune outside of Port-au-Prince, where he worked closely with other Haitian artists until 1987. The subject matter of his paintings was typically scenes of working-class Haitians, but occasionally Aladin depicted religious accounts inspired by Haitian Vodou.

Aladin's artwork has been featured in books, including "The Vodou Box" by Manuela Dunn Mascetti. He was also mentioned in the book Latin American and Caribbean Artists of the Modern Era: A Biographical Dictionary which said he was "noted for his colorful naive compositions depicting Haitian life."

He died of heart disease on August 17, 1993, at the age of 68.

Theard had nine children, among which is artist Agathe Aladin. She spent much of her early life watching and helping her father paint.

His work is included in various galleries and exhibitions including "The Jonathan Demme Collection of Self-Taught Art" (2014) at Material Culture Gallery in Philadelphia.

== See also ==
- Haitian art
