= Female sodomy =

Category of female sexual activities

Female sodomy is a general category of sexual or erotic activities enacted between women. It was codified as a legal category in medieval and early modern Europe, although it differed greatly between regions. Female sodomy is distinct from the social and legal category of (male) sodomy due to the significant differences in the way women accused of sodomy were seen in society and treated within the court system. A person who commits sodomy is sometimes referred to as a sodomite. Notable historical female sodomites include Katherina Hetzeldorfer and Benedetta Carlini.

The legal definition of sodomy in many places required an act of "unnatural penetration" and could therefore not be easily extrapolated to apply to the persecution of female sodomy. Due to the rigidity of social and legal categories of gender, any expression of sexuality that did not fit into the heterosexual paradigm was seen as a transgression of sexual and gendered norms. Female sodomy was therefore typically punished more harshly than those who committed crimes which were solely transgressions of sexual norms. Female sodomy appears to have been less widely persecuted than male sodomy in Europe during this period. The record of female sodomy in European history consists most overwhelmingly of fragmented court documents and personal correspondences, although the latter is quite rare. These sources reveal the harshness of the charge of female sodomy. As it was regarded as a transgression of gender, social, as well as sexual norms, these women were often charged with more than just sodomy. Many accusations of female sodomy were accompanied by accusations of witchcraft, deviancy, and hermaphroditism. This record offers insight on the differences between female and male sodomy, showcasing the strictness of social norms for women. A single transgression, such as participating in eroticism with other women resulted in the perception of these women as 'non-women', or in some cases even 'non-human'. Many regions in Europe had their own labels for female sodomites in order to classify them as non-women after these transgressions.

== Related terminology ==
Many terms related to female sodomy originated as slurs and other pejorative terms for sodomites. Many of these terms emerged alongside each other in similar cultural and social contexts.

=== Female hermaphrodite ===
The term "hermaphrodite" acted as a stand in for sociological chaos and any kind of sexual or gender transgression. There were both male and female hermaphrodites. In the early modern period there existed an idea that sodomites had physical representations of their deviancy. Female sodomites/female hermaphrodites were understood to have an enlarged clitoris that could be used for sexual penetration.

A "perfect hermaphrodite" was a person with two working sets of genitals; one male, one female.

Hermaphrodites of all kinds were commonly associated with witchcraft.

=== Tribades ===
The term "tribades" had many of the same connotations as hermaphrodite. Tribades specifically emerged after the 16th century rediscovery of the clitoris, and it refers specifically to female sodomites who have swollen and enlarged genitals that could be used to penetrate other women.

=== Fricatrice ===
The term "fricatrice" referred to a lewd woman who has sex with other women. This term is more explicitly associated with the pleasure taken from a dominant and masculine version of sexualities and sexual pursuit as wielded by a woman.

== Intersectional charges ==
The existing records of female sodomy in medieval and early modern Europe largely consist of court records and documents which detail the societal and social transgressions that warranted legal intervention and punishment. These sources are difficult to analyze due to a lack of certainty regarding the truthfulness of the record and the intentions of the accusers.

There is evidence that across Europe, charges of female sodomy were frequently tied to charges of witchcraft. Female sodomy was amorphous. Sodomy was generally regarded as a non-procreative and penetrative sexual act committed outside of marriage. Same-sex relations between women do not fit in easily to this conception of sodomy. There was a desire to punish these women as their actions were generally accepted as some sort of sexual transgression, but there was a lack of legal framework to do so. Female sodomites were often accused of witchcraft to legitimize their crimes as witchcraft was better defined and understood on a legal level. If persecuting authorities could not prove that the relationship between a few given women violated their male-oriented sodomy laws they could accuse the woman of witchcraft and use their sexual transgressions as evidence for this. Accusations of witchcraft included accusations of associations with the devil who was seen as the leader of witches and inspirer of transgressive sexual acts of deviancy.

Another intersectional charge often associated with female sodomites is hermaphroditism. In an early modern European context, both female and male hermaphrodites existed, as even transgressions of the gender binary must also slot within it. Female hermaphrodites were believed to have an unusually enlarged or swollen clitoris. This was regarded as the way women could penetrate other women. In some cases of female sodomy, at least one party was usually understood to be either a witch, a hermaphrodite, or both. This shows how rigid the gender binary was at this time, as well as how closely related sexual and gender transgressions were in a legal sense. If a female sodomite broke a norm surrounding sexuality, she was also seen as a deviant in terms of her gender and gender expression as well.

Accusations of female sodomy were frequently made by peers, friends, acquaintances of the accused. Gossip, class, and interpersonal relationships played a key role in how or if a woman was accused of sodomy. The legitimacy of many of these accusations, including the intersectional accusations female sodomy may elicit, may be better understood through a close analysis of the context in which the accusation was given. More research into this understudied subject is necessary.

== Geographical variances and statistics ==
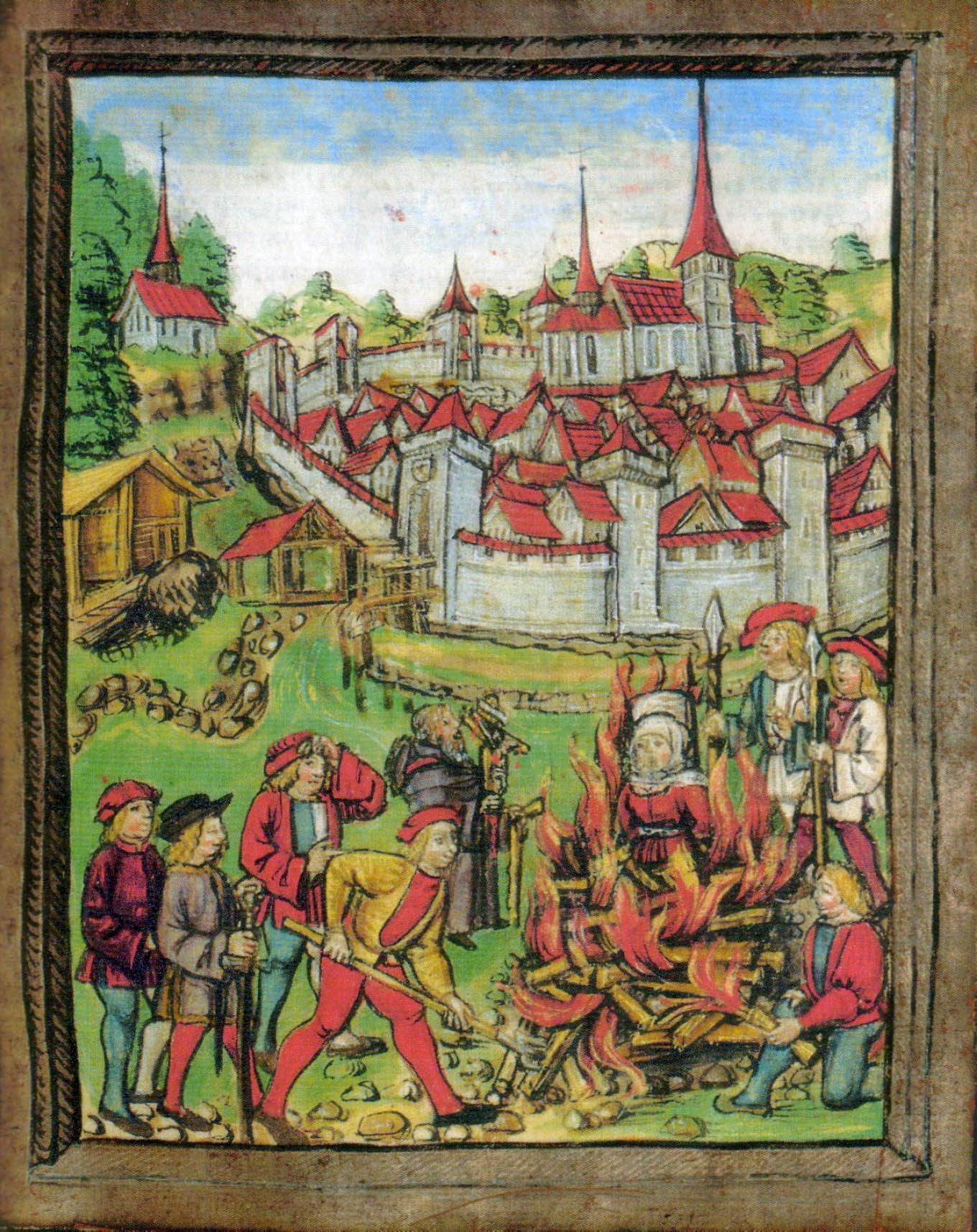
Execution scene from the chronicle of Schilling of Lucerne (1513), illustrating the burning of a woman accused of witchcraft in Willisau, Switzerland in 1447. Charges of sodomy against women were often accompanied with charges of witchcraft, resulting in harsh punishments like death by fire.

=== Medieval and early modern Europe ===
==== Bruges ====
Between 1385 and 1515 there were 90 executions for sodomy. 7 of the individuals executed were women.

==== Flanders ====
Women accounted for 28% of sodomy cases in Flanders between 1795 and 1798. Northern Europe was much more active in persecuting female sodomy, particularly in urban cities. Rumour mills were more contagious in big cities, which had more people to catch women in the act or notice when something is not completely heterosexual or normative.

==== Holy Roman Empire ====
Holy Roman Emperor Charles V introduced the Constitutio Criminalis Carolina into law in 1532. It was the first codified law to mention both male and female sexuality. Before this, sodomy and sexual transgressions were unspeakably taboo, but no less punishable. However, it was only with the introduction of this legislation that such acts were officially outlawed. Even after this law was enacted, among the numerous cases of sodomy persecuted under this law, only a handful were women, though exact numbers vary from location to location. As women's sexuality was seen as dependent on men, it was difficult to persecute an act which did not fit into a heterosexual conception of human sexuality.

==== Southern Netherlands ====
Female sodomy in the Southern Netherlands was treated differently than in most European nations. Whereas cases of female sodomy were often kept quiet in other states, the Southern Netherlands did not hide cases of female sodomy and executions were highly public. Almost 1 in 10 of the people charged with sodomy in the Southern Netherlands between 1400 and 1500 were women. Not only were women charged with sodomy at higher rates than in other states, but they were also punished more harshly. Female sodomites often received the same punishments as their male counterparts, which was highly unusual during this period. Unlike other crimes in which the method of execution was drowning or being buried alive, sodomites were burned alive. Often, groups of female sodomites would be executed together in large groups.

== Notable figures ==
=== Bertolina (Guercia) ===
Bertolina, known as Guercia, was an Italian woman living in Bologna in the late thirteenth century. She was a known sodomite in her town as her relationships with women were well known, but it was not until 1295 that legal accusations were made. A man solely identified in court records as Guilelmo accused Guercia of sodomy, magic, and fortune telling. At the time, sodomy was defined under Bolognese law as any non-procreative sexual act and only specified male same-sex acts. The trial was initially not going to proceed, as no male neighbors would testify against Guercia. Guilelmo then produced two witnesses, but only the records of one of their testimonies survived. Ugolino Martini testified that a year prior he had encountered Guercia during an evening walk. She was accompanied with singers she had hired to serenade an unidentified individual. Martini asked them to come with him to serenade a woman he was interested in. Upon revealing the identity of this woman, Guercia commented that she was sexually interested in her as well. Martini claimed that Guercia then showed him her various 'silk virilia' which she claimed to use to have sex with other women. Guercia did not respond to her summons to court, so she was banned from Bologna and was to be heavily fined if she returned. The standard punishment for men accused of sodomy in Bologna at the time was death by fire. The court case of Guercia is the earliest record of female sodomy in Europe.

=== Katherina Hetzeldorfer ===
Katherina Hetzeldorfer was accused of female sodomy (though the crime bears no name in the legal proceedings) in 1477 in Speyer, Germany. The only surviving record of her and of this case is the court documents that describe her trial and punishment. Hetzeldorfer was prosecuted and convicted for sexual relations with women. The court characterized her as a woman who adopted masculine sexuality, and it is transgression of gender norms that was the subject of offence at her trial. She was labeled as a hermaphrodite, and Hetzeldorfer, though originally she denied all charges against her, eventually was pressed to admit her transgressions. She was convicted and sentenced to death by drowning, a particularly shameful and degrading method of execution reserved for women, usually those convicted of witchcraft.

=== Maertyne van Keyschote ===
Maertyne van Keyschote lived in Bruges, around the turn of the sixteenth century. In 1514, van Keyschote confessed to charges of sodomy. She and the three others she admitted to sodomizing were punished. Van Keyschote and a woman named Jeanne vanden Steene were scourged and had their hair burned off. Both were banished from Flanders for a century. The two others were minors. Grietkin van Bomele and Grietkin van Assenede were charged with being misled into committing sodomy. They were only flogged due to their ages.

=== Mayken and Magdaleene ===
Mayken and Magdaleene were two women accused of female sodomy in 1618 in Bruges, Belgium. It began when Maetren van Ghewelde, Mayken's husband, was arrested for stealing a horse. When speaking to authorities, he reported that his wife had run away a year prior with a woman named Magdaleene, who the community had labeled a vagrant hermaphrodite. After his accusation, authorities began a search for the two women. When found, both were taken into custody and questioned.

Magdaleene was tortured, although she would not admit to the accusations of witchcraft and hermaphroditism. Despite this, the prosecution painted Magdaleene as a witch and a hermaphrodite, who was possessed by the devil. What is unique about this particular case is the fact that Mayken and Magdaleene were open about their homoerotic and romantic feelings towards one another, with Magdaleene herself professing a strong preference for the sexual company of women over men.

The trial ended on December 14, 1618. Mayken was ordered to pray to God for forgiveness and banished from the city of Bruges for 10 years under threat of torture. Magdaleene was imprisoned for 2 years, before she was released and banished for life from the county of Flanders. She was officially charged with indoctrinating women into sexual deviancy and suspicion of witchcraft.

=== Benedetta Carlini ===
Benedetta Carlini was a nun living in 17th century Pescia, Italy. Her case is among those most famous in the study of the history of female sodomy. Carlini had claimed to have visions imparted unto by the divine, an ability which eventually led to her becoming Abbess, as well as the growth of her authority in Pescia. In 1619, she was accused of female sodomy after an affair with a younger nun in her abbey, Bartolomea Crivell. In the trial, Carlini claimed that she was possessed by the spirit of an angel named Splenditello, who had used her body as a vessel through which Splenditello could enjoy sexual intercourse with Bartolomea. This defense only served to further the accusations of the prosecutors, and so Benedetta Carlini was sentenced to life in prison.

== Further research and context ==
The research into female sodomy is still ongoing, and there are many things relevant to the topic that are near unknowable, given the nature of the research into the history of sexuality and sexuality law. It is difficult and anachronistic to apply more modern terms to the phenomenon of female sodomy, like lesbianism, bisexuality, being transgender, and gender neutrality. One must study cases of female sodomites within their contexts. The historical record consists mainly of court documents, with the occasional extremely rare personal letter. The definition and legal parameters of 'female sodomy' differed from location to location, however it seems as though the persecution of female sodomy was prolific in European regions from the middle ages to the early modern period.
