= Agatha Dietschi =

German lesbian aka Hans the Reaper (died after 1547)

Agatha Dietschi, also known as Hans Kaiser and Schnitter Hensli (Hans the Reaper) (died after 1547), was a German charged for having lived their life as a man and marrying a woman, despite having been declared female at birth. This case is regarded as an important one in the history of prosecution of LGBTQ+ individuals.

== Life ==
Agatha Dietschi was originally from the village of Wehingen, and there, for a time, apparently dressed as a woman and was married to a man. Later, Dietschi appeared at the village of Niedingen by the Danube dressed as a man, using the name Hans Kaiser. Hans Kaiser laboured as a farm worker, and thus became known as Schnitter Hensli (Hans the Reaper). At some point, Kaiser was said to have married a woman with children and then, after leaving the village for a time, to have returned without the wife or children, claiming they had died.

Thereafter, Hans Kaiser married Anna Reuli in 1538 and the couple settled in Freiburg im Breisgau. The couple lived happily until 1547, when Anna Reuli wished to marry her lover Marx Gross, and hoped to have the marriage to Kaiser dissolved. Anna Reuli divulged the secret, and her husband was arrested.

Dietschi was arrested and charged for heresy, suspected of being a homosexual. It was unusual for women to be prosecuted for homosexuality, but when they were, they were charged with heresy just like their male counterparts, which is illustrated by the rare case against Agatha Dietschi. However, as sexual intercourse was defined as penetration, women were more likely to be convicted if they had penetrated each other with a dildo, which happened in the case of Catherine de la Maniere and Francoise de l'Estrage in France in 1537, and against an unnamed woman in Basel the same year. In the case of Agatha Dietschi, witnesses claimed to have seen Ditschi and Reuli involved in sexual activity in a barn, and evidence was presented that Dietschi had manufactured a dildo. However, Marx Gross insisted that Reuli was a virgin, and the court ruled that the dildo in question was useless for penetration.

Dietschi was spared the death penalty, and was instead pilloried, and exiled from the city.

== See also ==
- Katherina Hetzeldorfer
