= Aet Maatee =

Estonian politician

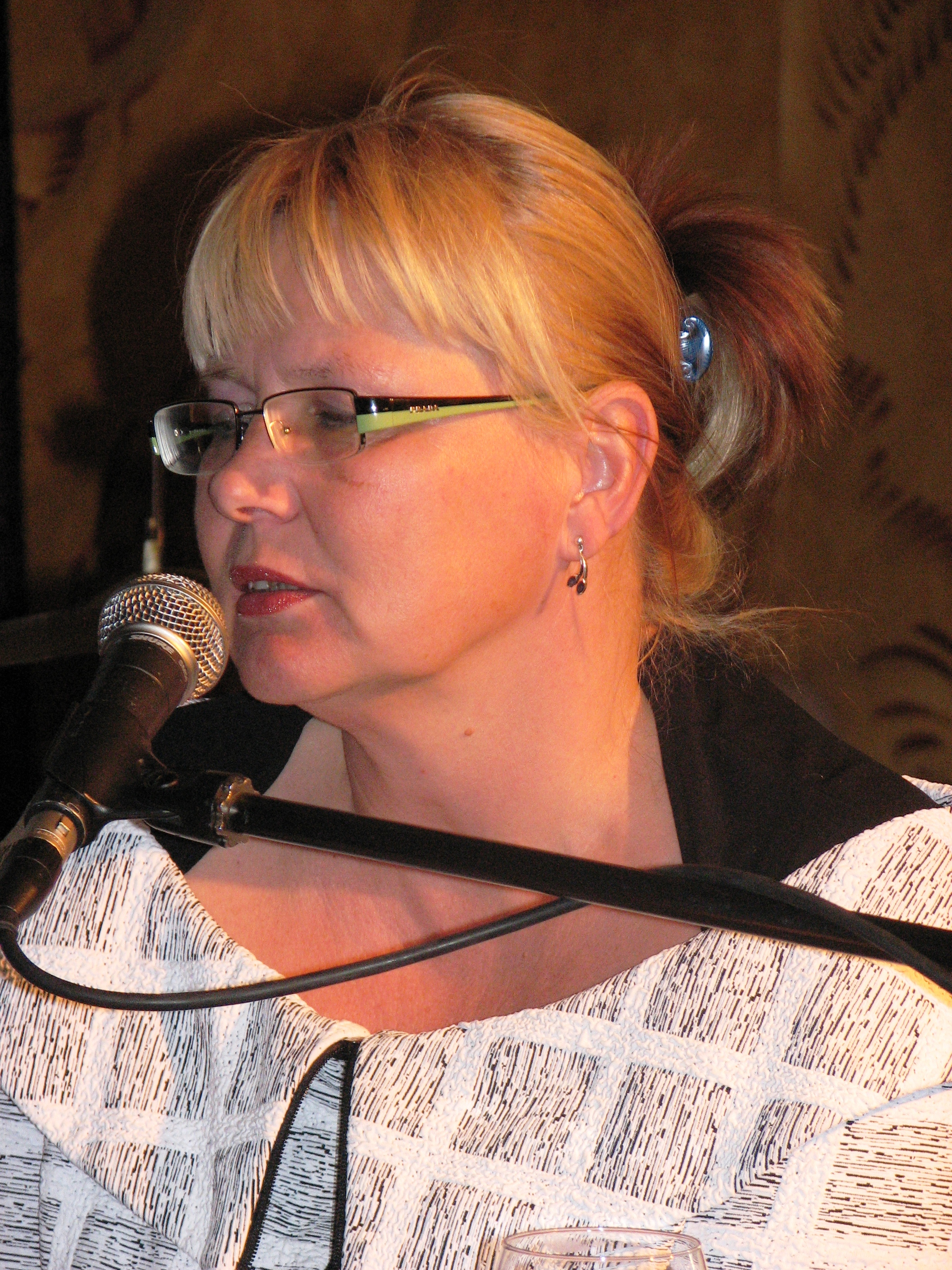
Aet Maatee

Aet Maatee (born 10 November 1961) is an Estonian cultural organizer, long-term director of the Estonian Song and Dance Festival Foundation, director of the Pärnu Museum, and politician. She was a member of the XIII Riigikogu.

She was a member of Social Democratic Party.
