= Agatha Yi Kyong-i =

Korean saint and martyr

Saint Yi Kyong-i Agatha
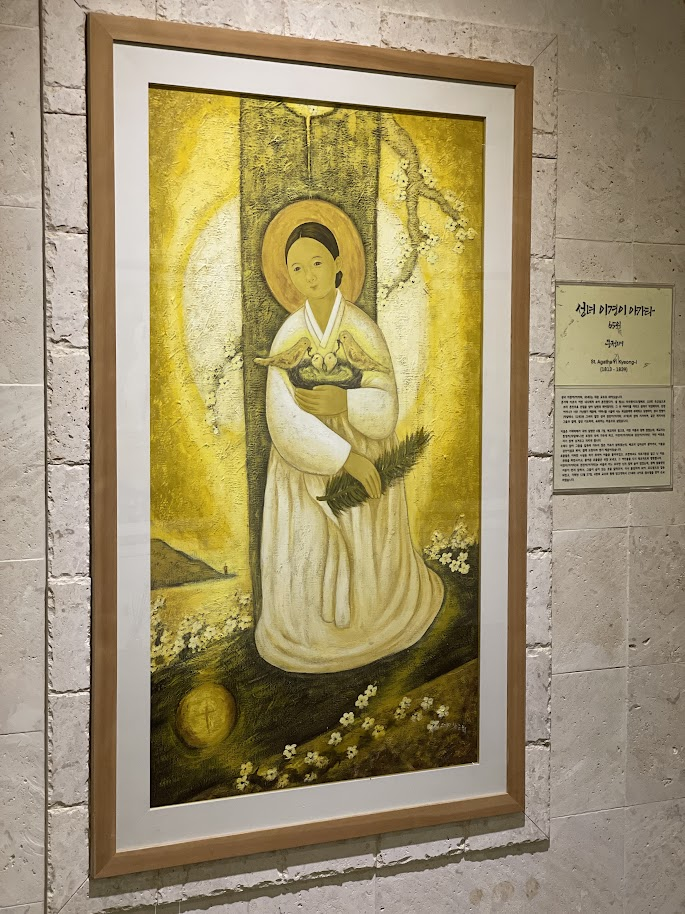
- Born: 1814
- Died: 1840 (aged 25–26); Korea
- Venerated in: Roman Catholic Church
- Beatified: July 5, 1909 by Pius XI
- Canonized: May 6, 1984 by John Paul II
- Major shrine: Danggogae Martyrs' Shrine
- Feast: September 20

St. Agatha Yi Kyong-i (1814–1840) is a Korean saint and martyr.

== Biography ==
She was born in a Catholic family. She married a eunuch; her bishop advised her to separate from her husband, and she went to live with St. Agatha Kwon Chin-i because her mother was too poor to support her. She converted her family to the Christian faith, visited and helped many Catholics, and wanted to be a martyr for her faith. Agatha was arrested with Chin-i and a servant girl, and placed under house arrest. Their guards, "who had pity on them", helped all three women escape. The servant girl, however, was re-captured, and told her captors where the other women were hiding; they were re-arrested and the guards who helped them escape were punished by their superiors. They were severely tortured and beaten, "but they would not give up their faith". At the age of 27, Agatha was beheaded on January 31, 1840, with five other Catholics, including Chin-i, in Danggogae in what is now the Yongsan district of Seoul.

St. Agatha was part of the persecution of Catholics in Korea that took place over the course of 100 years. Up to 10,000 Catholics were martyred for their faith because they were perceived as a threat to local Confucian ideals, over five main waves of persecution. She was executed during "the infamous 1839–1840 Gihae Persecution", with a group of ten prisoners, including St. Mary Yi Seong-rye. Nine of the Danggogae martyrs, including St. Agatha, were canonized by Pope John Paul II in 1984, when he canonized 103 martyrs and French missionaries killed during the waves of persecutions in Korea. There is a shrine dedicated to the martyrs at Danggogae, which honors the third-highest number of martyred saints in Korea.
