= Agat, Myanmar =

Agat
- Location in Burma
- Coordinates: 16°33′52″N 95°18′18″E
- Country: Burma
- Division: Ayeyarwady Division

Population
  - Religions: Buddhism
- Time zone: UTC+6.30 (MST)

Agat is a village in Ayeyarwady Division, Burma.
