= Agathe Aladin =

Haitian artist

- Born: May 25, 1967 (age 58); Jacmel, Haiti
- Known for: Painting

Agathe Aladin (born 1967) is a Haitian artist, known for her paintings in both oil and acrylic. Her paintings include scenes of family, womanhood, everyday life, and Haitian Vodou.

== Early life ==
Agathe Aladin was born on May 25, 1967, in Jacmel, one of several children of Haitian painter Theard Aladin. She spent much of her early life watching and helping her father paint. Upon her father's death in 1993, Agathe began her own paintings, following the style of her father. Painting runs in the Aladin family, as her father and his cousins, Prefete Duffaut and Paulesu Vital, were also painters in Haiti. In addition to learning the craft of painting from her father and other family, she studied with Maurice Vital.

== Biography ==
Aladin paints vodou scenes, family scenes, womanhood scenes, and every day scenes. She is said to call her style of painting "imaginary free." Aladin now lives in Carrefour, Haiti with her husband and three children. Her home was destroyed in the 2010 earthquake, causing Aladin and her family to live for five months under tarps and sheets until tents were provided.

A collection of four oil paintings by Agathe Aladin is held at the Waterloo Center for the Arts, including the oil painting Music in the Countryside (1998), which depicts a woman playing an instrument while wearing a purple headdress and is surrounded by an ox, calf, stream, and hills.

== Notable work ==
- Agoue and La Sirene, 2009, Acrylic on Canvas, 30 inches x 24 inches, Collection of Bill Bollendorf, Pittsburgh, Pennsylvania
- Simbi Birthing the Waters, 1998, Oil on Canvas, 20 inches x 16 inches, Collection of the Waterloo Center for the Arts, Waterloo, Iowa
- Seaside Highway, 1997, Acrylic on Canvas, 30 inches x 20 inches, this painting portrays a location along highway near Jacmel, Haiti.
- The Lovers, 1996, Acrylic on Canvas, 16 inches x 20 inches, this was the one of 25 Haitian paintings from this collection that were exhibited in Life in Bold Colors at Sonoma State University in 2007.

== Resources ==
- Benson, LeGrace. “The Eclectic Ecumenical Religious Expressions of Contemporary Haitian Artists.” In Arts and Religions of Haiti: How the Sun Illuminates Under the Cover of Darkness, 245-246. Kingston, Jamaica: Ian Randle Publishers, 2015.
