= Agatha Bennett =

American artist (1919–2006)

- Born: 1919; Gee's Bend, Alabama, U.S.
- Died: 2006 (aged 86–87)
- Citizenship: American
- Occupations: Artist, quilter

Agatha Bennett (1919–2006) was an American artist. She is associated with the Gee's Bend quilting collective, alongside her mother-in-law, Delia Bennett. Her work is included in the collection of the High Museum of Art.

== Early life and family ==
Bennett was born in Gee's Bend at the Herbert Hall Wilkinson Plantation. She was raised by her grandparents, Emma and Jacob Coleman. She and Rev. Pernell Bennett married in 1940 and raised 14 children together subsistence farming, working for canning factories, and wood mills.

== Quilt maker ==
Bennett was a member of the Gee's Bend quilting collective.

== Legacy ==
Through interviews with her husband, Souls Grown Deep Foundation documented Agatha's personal life and development as a quilter.
