= Agata Różańska =

20th and 21st-century Polish astronomer

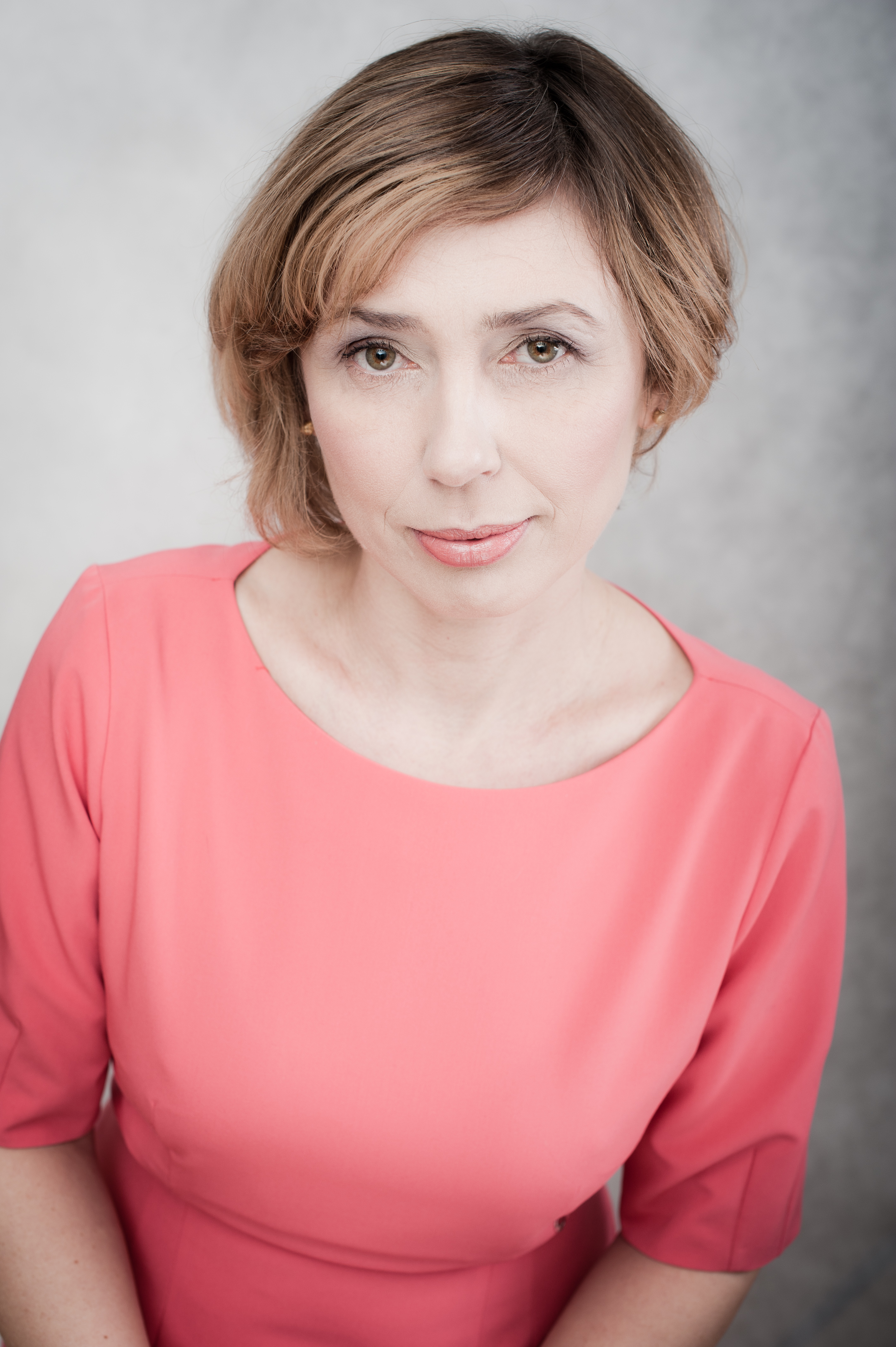
- Agata Różańska (2016)
- Born: 3 October 1968 (age 58); Bydgoszcz, Poland
- Education: University of Warsaw
- Scientific career
- Fields: Astronomer
- Workplaces: Nicolaus Copernicus Astronomical Center

Agata Różańska [aˈɡata ruˈʐaɲska] (born 3 October 1968 in Bydgoszcz, Poland) is a Polish astronomer and astrophysicist. Research Professor at the field of X-ray astronomy. She works on numerical computations of emission processes in astrophysical X-ray sources and their observations.

== Career and research ==
Her areas of research include simulations of radiative transfer through the warm ionized media, through the hot atmospheres of neutron stars and atmospheres of accretion disks around black holes in active galactic nuclei and in X-ray binaries. She started the study of multi-phase regions around supermassive black holes in the centres of galaxies. She is a leader of Polish team of scientist and engineers working on the development of subsystems for the ATHENA (Advanced Telescope for High Energy Astrophysics) - new generation space mission, with a launch foreseen in 2032. She is a member of Polish Astronomical Society, International Astronomical Union and European Astronomical Society. Since 2013, she is the Treasurer of the Polish Astronomical Society. In 2019 she was appointed a member of Space and Satellite Research Committee of the Polish Academy of Sciences for the 2019–2022 term. She was elected a Council member of the European Astronomical Society for the 2020–2024 term. She is an author of public outreach articles, lectures and popular science movies.

== Education ==
Różańska graduated the 5th Secondary school in Bydgoszcz, Poland. Her master's degree in astronomy, she completed at the Faculty of Physics University of Warsaw. PhD in astrophysics titled: Coexistence of the cold and the hot plasma in the vicinity of the black hole she defended in the year 2000, under the supervision of prof. Bożena Czerny. She obtained the habilitation degree for the work titled: The effects of X-ray reprocessing in Active Galactic Nuclei, in 2009. She received the title of professor in 2020. Currently, she works at Nicolaus Copernicus Astronomical Center Polish Academy of Sciences in Warsaw, Poland.

== See also ==
- List of Poles § Astronomy
