= Agatha Welhouk =

Dutch woman who was sued by her father for marrying without his consent

- Born: 1637; South Holland, Netherlands
- Died: 1715; Netherlands
- Spouse: Arnold Bornius (1657–1665; 1670-?)
- Father: Gerahdo Cornelisz Welhouck of Delft

Agatha Welhouk (1637–1715) was the central figure of a court case in the Netherlands, where she and her father, sued each other regarding whether a marriage should be considered legal if it had taken place without the consent of the parent.

Welhouk was the daughter of Mayor Gerahdo Cornelisz Welhouck of Delft and Petronella Adriaansdr.

She married a vicar, Arnold Bornius, without the consent of her father in 1655, for which she was sued by her father in 1657. They were forced to separate in 1658, and Welhouk was sentenced to house arrest after having seen her spouse in 1661. Her marriage was declared illegal in 1665, and then declared legal in 1670. The Welhouk case attracted a lot of attention, and became a reference case which affected the law regarding the guardianship of parents over children until the 19th century.
