= Agat (given name) =

Agat (Russian: Ага́т) is a Russian male first name. While "Agat" is simply a Russification of certain Western European names (all of which derive from the Greek word agathos, which means good, kind), it was also one of the newly created names documented in the 1920s and 1930s, given after agate, a semi-precious stone.
