= Dutch Renaissance and Golden Age literature =

Dutch Renaissance and Golden Age literature is the literature written in the Dutch language between around 1550 and around 1700. This period saw great political and religious changes as the Reformation spread across Northern and Western Europe and the Netherlands fought for independence in the Eighty Years' War.

== Rhetoricians ==
In the middle of the 16th century, a group of rhetoricians (see Medieval Dutch literature) in Brabant and Flanders attempted to put new life into the stereotyped forms of the preceding age by introducing in original composition the new-found branches of Latin and Greek poetry. The leader of these men was Johan Baptista Houwaert (1533–1599), a personage of considerable political influence in his generation. Houwaert held the title of Counsellor and Master in Ordinary of the Exchequer to the Duchy of Brabant. He considered himself a devout disciple of Matthijs de Casteleyn, but his great characteristic was his unbounded love of classical and mythological fancy. His didactic poems are composed in a rococo style; of all his writings, Pegasides Pleyn ("The Palace of Maidens"), a didactic poem in sixteen books dedicated to a discussion of the variety of earthly love, is the most remarkable. Houwaert's contemporaries nicknamed him the "Homer of Brabant"; later criticism has preferred to see in him an important link in the chain of didactic Dutch which ends in Cats.

== Metrical Psalms ==
The stir and revival of intellectual life that arrived with the Reformation found its first expression in the composition of Psalms. The earliest printed collection appeared at Antwerp in 1540, under the title of Souter-Liedekens ("Psalter Songs") and was dedicated to a Dutch nobleman, Willem van Zuylen van Nieuvelt, by whose name it is usually known. This collection, however, was made before the Reformation in the Low Countries really set in. For the Protestant congregations, Jan Utenhove printed a volume of Psalms in London in 1566; Lucas de Heere and Petrus Datheen translated hymns of Clément Marot. Datheen was not a rhetorician, but a person of humble origin who wrote in unadorned language, and his hymns spread far and wide among the people.

== The Revolt ==
=== Battle hymns ===
Very different in tone were the battle songs of liberty and triumph sung a generation later by the victorious Reformers, the Gueux songs. The famous songbook of 1588, Een Geusen Lied Boecxken ("A Gueux Songbook"), was full of ardent and heroic sentiment. In this collection appeared for the first time such classical snatches of Dutch song as "The Ballad of Heiligerlee" and "The Ballad of Egmont and Horne". The political ballads, with their ridicule of the Spanish leaders, form a section of the Boecxken which has proved of inestimable value to historians. All these lyrics, however, whether of victory or of martyrdom, are still very rough in form and language.

=== Marnix of St-Aldegonde ===
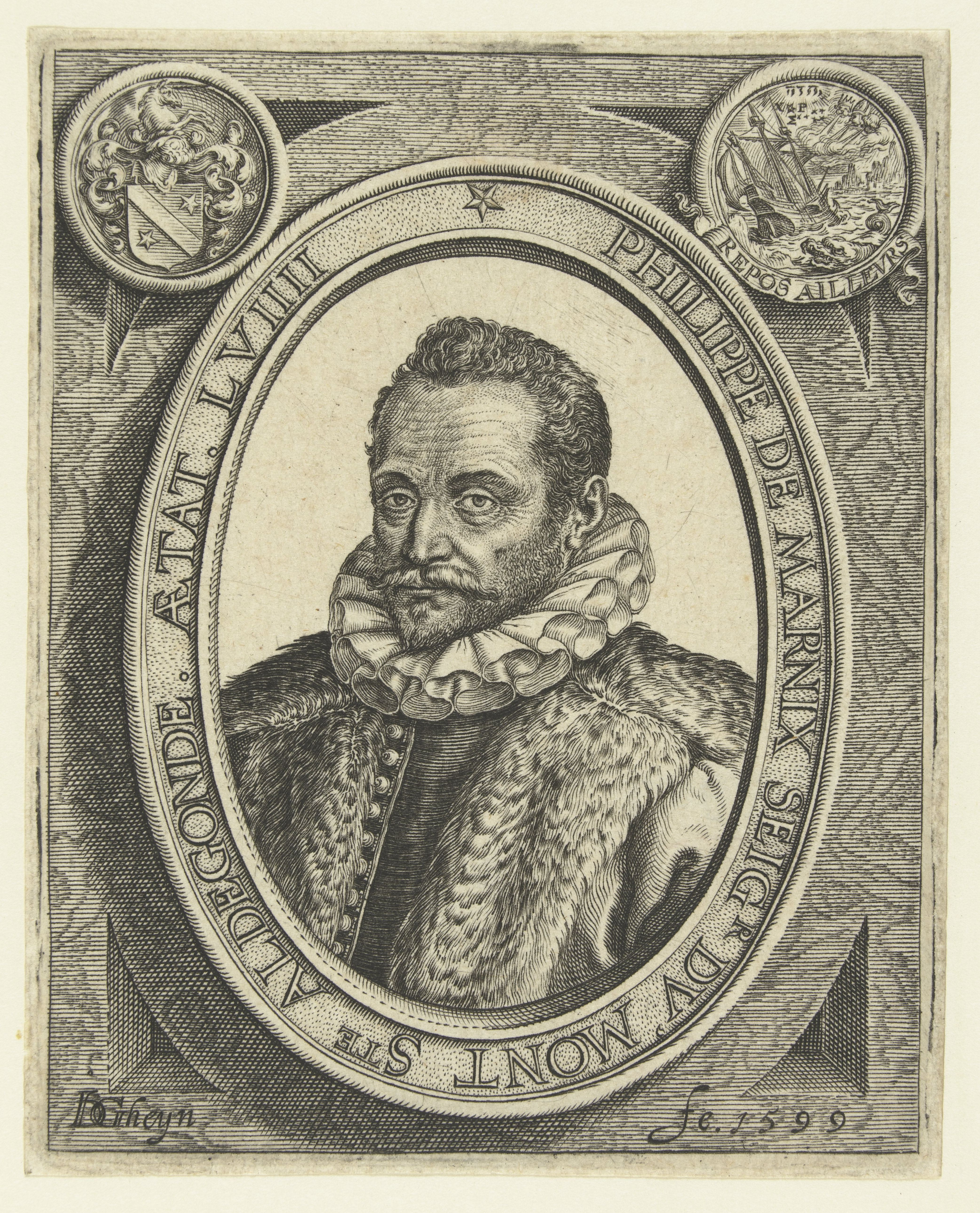
Philips van Marnix.

In Philips van Marnix, lord of Sint-Aldegonde (1538–1598), a personage came forward in the ranks of liberty and reform. He was born at Brussels in 1538, and began life as a disciple of Calvin and Beza in the schools of Geneva. It was as a defender of the Dutch iconoclasts that he first appeared in print in August 1566. He soon became one of the leading spirits in the war of Dutch independence and the intimate friend of the Prince of Orange. The lyrics to Wilhelmus, the Dutch national anthem, an apology of the actions of the Prince of Orange composed around 1568, are attributed to Marnix. In 1569 Marnix completed Biëncorf der Heilige Roomsche Kercke ("Beehive of the Roman Catholic Church"). In this satire he was inspired by François Rabelais, of whom he was a disciple. It is written in prose that is considered to mark an epoch in the language and literature of the Low Countries. Overwhelmed with the press of public business, Marnix wrote little more until in 1580 he published Het boeck der psalmen Davids ("The Book of the Psalms of David"), newly translated out of the Hebrew. He occupied the last years of his life in preparing a Dutch version of the Bible, translated directly from the original. At his death, only Genesis was found completely revised; but in 1619 the Synod of Dort placed the unfinished work in the hands of four theologians.

This translation by Marnix proved the starting point for a new complete translation of the Bible into Dutch. The Synod had been convened to settle a number of politico-theological issues, but also decided to appoint a committee to translate the Bible. Representatives of nearly all provinces participated in the project, which sought to use a language intermediate between the main Dutch dialects to be intelligible to all Dutchmen. With the resulting translation, called Statenvertaling or "States' Translation", an important cornerstone was laid for the standard Dutch language as it appears today.

=== Coornhert ===
Dirck Volckertszoon Coornhert (1522–1590), was the Low Countries' first truly humanist writer. Coornhert was a typical burgher of North Holland, equally interested in the progress of national emancipation and in the development of national literature. He was a native of Amsterdam, but he did not take part in the labours of the old chamber of the Eglantine. Quite early in life he proceeded to Haarlem, becoming pensionary of the town. In 1566 Coornhert was imprisoned for his support of the Reformers, and in 1572 he became secretary to the States of Holland. He practised the art of etching and spent all his spare time in the pursuit of classical learning. In 1585 he translated Boethius, and then gave his full attention to his original masterpiece, the Zedekunst ("Art of Ethics", 1586), a philosophical treatise in prose in which he tried to adapt the Dutch tongue to the grace and simplicity of Michel de Montaigne's French. His humanism unites the Bible, Plutarch and Marcus Aurelius in one grand system of ethics and is expressed in a bright style. Coornhert died at Gouda on October 29, 1590; his works were first collected in 1630.

By this time, the religious and political upheaval in the Low Countries had resulted in 1581 in an Act of Abjuration of Philip II of Spain, a key moment in the subsequent eighty years' struggle 1568–1648. As a result, the southern provinces, some of which had supported the declaration, were separated from the northern provinces as they remained under Habsburg rule. Ultimately, this would result in the present-day states of Belgium and Luxembourg (south) and the Netherlands (north). The rise of the northern provinces to independent statehood was accompanied by a cultural renaissance. The north received a cultural and intellectual boost whereas in the south, Dutch was to some extent replaced by French and Latin as the languages of culture.

== Literature of the Dutch Golden Age ==
At Amsterdam two men took a very prominent place thanks to their intelligence and modern spirit. The first, Hendrick Laurensz. Spieghel (1549–1612) was a humanist, less polemical than Coornhert. His chief contribution to literature was his Twe-spraack van de Nederduytsche Letterkunst ("Dialogue on Dutch Literature"), a philological exhortation urging the Dutch nation to purify and enrich its tongue at the fountains of antiquity. That Spieghel was a Catholic prevented him perhaps from exercising as much public influence as he exercised privately among his younger friends. The same may be said of the man who in 1614 first collected Spieghel's writings and published them in a volume together with his own verse. Roemer Visscher (1547–1620) proceeded a step further than Spieghel in the cultivation of polite letters. He was deeply tinged with a spirit of classical learning. His own disciples called him the Dutch Martial, but he was at best little more than an amateur in poetry, although an amateur whose function it was to perceive and encourage the genius of professional writers. Roemer Visscher stands at the threshold of the new Renaissance literature, himself practising the faded arts of the rhetoricians, but pointing by his counsel and his conversation to the naturalism of the great period.

It was in the salon at Amsterdam which Visscher's daughters formed around their father and themselves that the new school began to take form. The republic of the United Provinces, with Amsterdam at its head, had suddenly risen to first rank among the nations of Europe and it was under the influence of so much new ambition that the country asserted itself in a great school of painting and poetry.

The intellectual life of the Low Countries was concentrated in the provinces of Holland and Zeeland, while the universities of Leiden, Groningen, Utrecht, Amsterdam, Harderwijk and Franeker were enriched by a flock of learned exiles from Flanders and Brabant. Visscher realised that the path of literary honour lay not along the utilitarian road cut out by Jacob van Maerlant and his followers, but in the study of beauty and antiquity. In this he was aided by the school of ripe and enthusiastic scholars who began to flourish at Leiden, such as Drusius, Vossius and Hugo Grotius, who themselves wrote little in Dutch but chastened the style of the rising generation by insisting on a pure and liberal Latinity.

Out of that generation a few great men in Dutch literature arose: Vondel, Hooft, Cats, and Huijgens. In this period a quickening of the broad farcical humour is to be noticed which had been characteristic of the Dutch nation from its commencement. These are noted as glorious in the annals of the Dutch republic. In the house of Roemer Visscher the tragedies of Vondel, the comedies of Bredero and the odes of Huygens were read the first time. Of the daughters of Visscher, Tesselschade (1594–1649) wrote lyrics; she also translated works of Tasso. Through their accomplishments, Visscher's daughters attracted all the most gifted youths of the time to his house.

=== P. C. Hooft ===
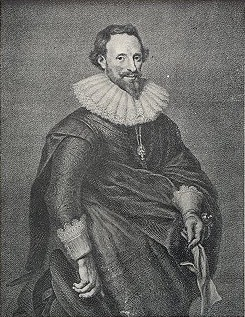
P.C. Hooft.

Of this Amsterdam school, the first to emerge into public notice was Pieter Corneliszoon Hooft (1581–1647). His Achilles and Polyxena (1598) displayed ease in the use of rhetorical artifices of style. In his pastoral drama of Granida (1605) he proved himself a pupil of Guarini. In tragedy he produced Baeto and Geraard van Velsen; in history he published in 1626 his Life of Henry the Great, while from 1628 to 1642 he wrote his masterpiece, the Nederduytsche Historiën ("History of the Netherlands"). Hooft was a purist in style. In his poetry, especially in the lyrical and pastoral verse of his youth, he is full of Italian reminiscences both of style and matter; in his noble prose work he has set himself to be a disciple of Tacitus. Hooft is considered one of the greatest historians, not merely of the Low Countries, but of Europe. His influence in standardising the language of his country can hardly be overrated. The literary circle founded by Roemer Visscher later centered around Hooft, in whose castle at Muiden they regularly convened, and after which they were later called Muiderkring or "Circle of Muiden".

=== Bredero ===
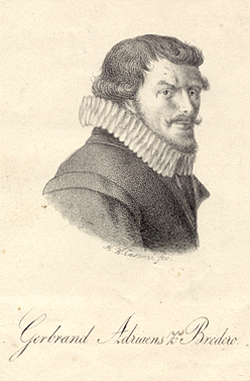
Gerbrand Adriaensz Bredero.

Very different from the long and successful career of Hooft was the brief life of one of the most successful comic dramatist that the Low Countries have produced. Gerbrand Adriaensz Bredero (1585–1618), the son of an Amsterdam shoemaker, knew no Latin and had no taste for humanism; he came out of the rich humour of the people. Bredero entered the workshop of the painter Francisco Badens, but accomplished little in art. His life was embittered by a love for Tesselschade, to whom he dedicated his plays, and whose beauty he celebrated in a whole cycle of love songs.

His ideas on the subject of drama were at first a development of the medieval abele spelen (see Medieval Dutch literature), but in 1612 he struck out a new and more characteristic path in his Klucht van de koe ("Farce of the Cow"). From this time until his death he continued to pour out comedies, farces and romantic dramas, in all of which he displayed a rough genius not unlike that of Ben Jonson, his immediate contemporary. Bredero's last and best piece was De Spaansche Brabanber Jerolimo ("Jerolimo, the Spanish Brabanter"), a satire upon the exiles from the south who filled the halls of the Amsterdam chambers of rhetoric with their pompous speeches and preposterous Burgundian phraseology. Bredero was closely allied in genius to the dramatists of the Shakespearian age, but he founded no school and stands as a solitary figure in Dutch literature. He died on August 23, 1618, of complications caused by pneumonia.

=== The Prince of Poets ===
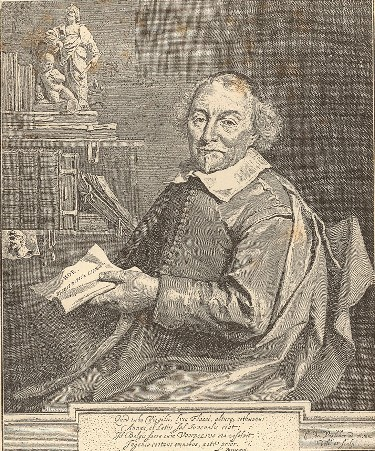
Joost van den Vondel.

The first work of one of the best-known of all Dutch writers, Joost van den Vondel (1587–1679), was Het Pascha ("The Passover", 1612), a tragedy on the Exodus of the people of Israel. It was written in alexandrines, in five acts, and with choral interludes between the acts. He would go on to write all of his plays in this fashion, but for a number of years after his debut wrote no original material at all, instead opting to translate du Bartas. The short and brilliant life of Bredero, his immediate contemporary and greatest rival, burned itself out in a succession of dramatic victories, and it was not until two years after the death of that great poet that Vondel appeared before the public with a second tragedy. Another five years later, in 1625, he published what seemed an innocent study from the antique, his tragedy of Palamedes, or Murdered Innocence, but which was a thinly veiled tribute to Johan van Oldebarnevelt, the Republic's Grand Pensionary who had been executed in 1618 by order of stadtholder Maurice of Nassau. Vondel became in a week the most famous writer in Holland and for the next twelve years, until the accession of stadtholder Frederick Henry, Vondel had to maintain a hand-to-hand combat with the Calvinists of Dordrecht. This was the period of his most stinging satires; Cats took up weapons on behalf of the Counter-Remonstrants and a war of pamphlets in verse raged.

Vondel, as the greatest playwright of the day, was asked in 1637 to write the first-night piece for the opening of a new and soon leading public theatre in Amsterdam. On the January 3, 1638, the theatre was opened with the performance of a new tragedy out of early Dutch history and to this day one of Vondel's best-known works, Gysbreght van Aemstel. The next ten years Vondel supplied the theatre with heroic Scriptural pieces, of which the general reader will obtain the best idea if we point to Jean Racine. In 1654 Vondel brought out what most consider the best of all his works, the tragedy of Lucifer, from which it is said Milton drew inspiration. Vondel is the typical example of Dutch intelligence and imagination at their highest development.

=== Colonial Literature ===
The Republic's colonies, of which the Dutch East Indies were the most important, started to produce writers as well, the first of which was Abraham Alewijn (b. 1664), a comedy playwright who lived in Java and whose plays were produced in Batavia. Another writer from the colonies was Willem Godschalk van Focquenbroch (1640–1670), who lived and worked from 1668 in the Dutch possession of Elmina in present-day Ghana. His comedy Min in het Lazarus-huys ("Love in the Madhouse", 1672) was very popular in the 17th and 18th centuries.

In the North American colony of New Netherland, poems in Dutch were composed and published by Jacob Steendam and Pieter Corneliszoon Plockhoy.

=== Jacob Cats ===
While most of the writers of Holland clustered around the circle of Amsterdam, a similar school arose in Middelburg, the capital of Zeeland. The ruling spirit of this school was Jacob Cats (1577–1660). In this voluminous writer the genuine Dutch habit of thought, the utilitarian and didactic spirit reached its zenith of fluency and popularity. During early middle life he produced the most important of his writings, his didactic poems, the Maechdenplicht ("Duty of Maidens") and the Sinne- en Minnebeelden ("Images of Allegory and Love"). In 1624 he moved from Middelburg to Dordrecht, where he soon after published his ethical work called Houwelick ("Marriage"); and this was followed by an entire series of moral pieces. Cats is considered somewhat dull and prosaic by some, yet his popularity with the middle classes in Holland has always been immense.

=== Constantijn Huygens ===
A versatile poet was the diplomat Sir Constantijn Huygens (1596–1687), perhaps best known for his witty epigrams. He threw in his lot with the school of Amsterdam and became the intimate friend and companion of Vondel, Hooft and the daughters of Roemer Visscher. Huygens had little of the sweetness of Hooft or of the sublimity of Vondel, but his genius was bright and vivacious, and he was a consummate artist in metrical form. The Dutch language has never proved so light and supple in any hands as in his, and, he attempted no class of writing, whether in prose or verse, that he did not adorn by his delicate taste and sound judgment.

=== Philosophy ===
Two Dutchmen of the 17th century distinguished themselves very prominently in the movement of learning and philosophic thought, but the names of Hugo Grotius (1583–1645) and Baruch Spinoza (1632–1677) belong more to philosophy and politics than literature.

== Summary ==
The period from 1600 to 1650 was a blossoming time in Dutch literature. During this period the names of great genius were first made known to the public, and the vigor and grace of literary expression reached their highest development. It happened, however, that three men of particularly commanding talent survived to an extreme old age, and under the shadow of Vondel, Cats and Huygens there sprang up a new generation which sustained the great tradition until about 1680, when decline set in.

== See also ==
- Basic Library of Dutch Literature
- Canon of Dutch Literature
- Renaissance in the Netherlands
- For more background information on the political and cultural background against which Dutch Renaissance and Golden Age literature was composed, see the articles Eighty Years War, Dutch republic, William I, Prince of Orange, Maurice of Nassau, Frederick Henry, Prince of Orange and Peace of Westphalia (politics), and Dutch Golden Age (culture).
