= Theodore Rodenburgh =

17th-century Dutch diplomat and playwright

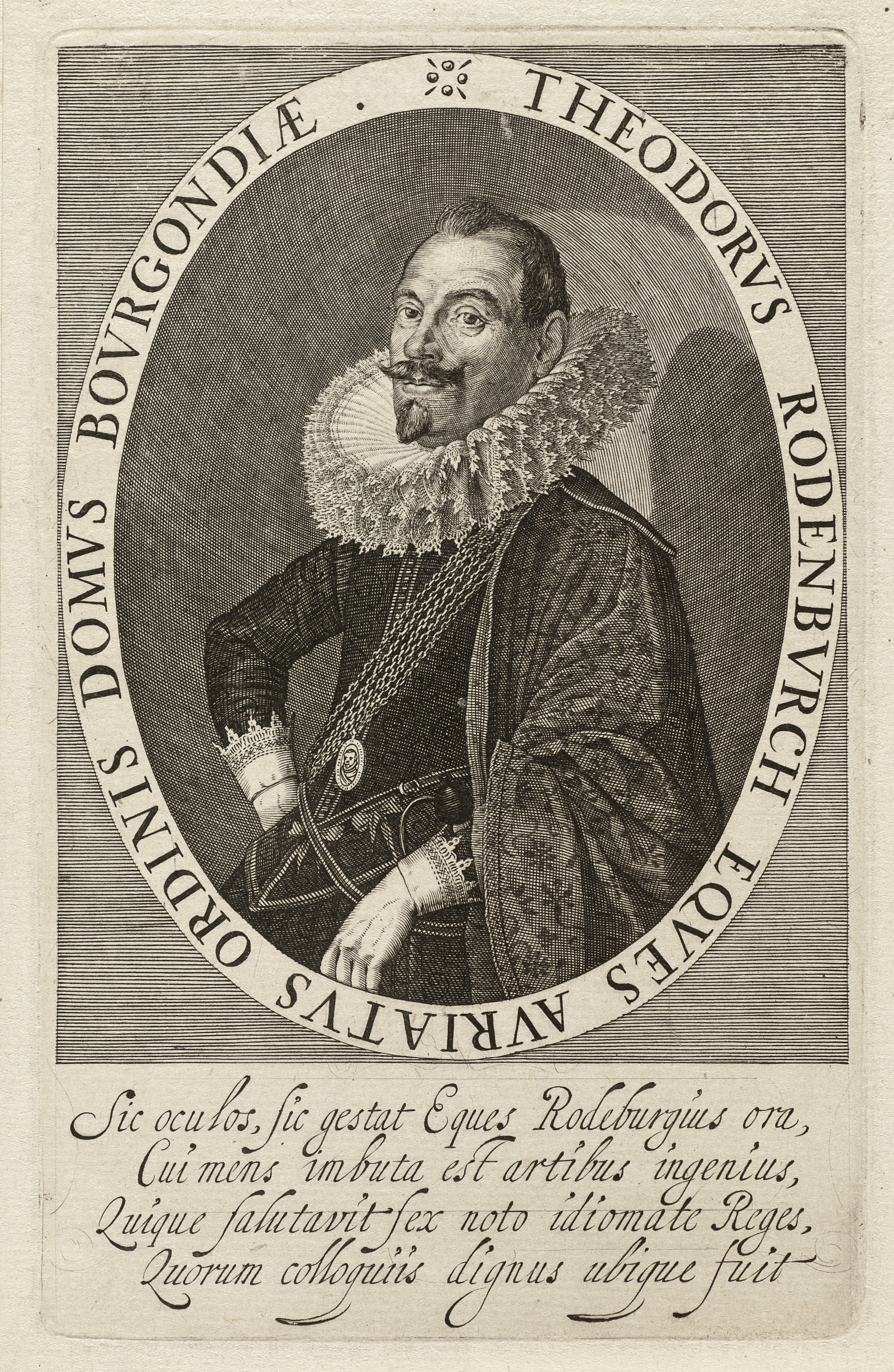
- Portrait of Theodore Rodenburgh, diplomat and playwright, dressed in Spanish fashion
- Baptized: 29 January 1574, Antwerp
- Died: 1644
- Occupation(s): Diplomat, playwright
- Era: Dutch Golden Age

Theodore Rodenburgh (baptised 29 January 1574, Antwerp - 1644) was a diplomat and playwright of the Dutch Golden Age. His first name is sometimes spelled Theodoor, and occasionally the nick-name Dirk is seen; his last name is sometimes spelled Rodenburg or Rodenberg.

He was well-travelled and spoke several languages. He states that he studied in Italy and Portugal, and spent time in the French court. For several years he was a trade representative in London for cities of the Hanseatic League, although the dates are unclear: P.E.L. Verkuyl putting him there from December 1602 to March 1607, and Nigel Smith favoring the dates "1601 until after June 1610".

He was an envoy to the court of Philip III of Spain in Madrid from 1611 to 1613, where he likely attended performances of comedias. He was the first to adapt Spanish comedias into Dutch; four of these adaptations were staged, then subsequently printed in 1617-1618.

He was appointed chairman of "The Eglantine" chamber of rhetoric in 1617, shortly after the exit of playwrights Samuel Coster, Pieter Corneliszoon Hooft, and Gerbrand Bredero who formed the competing First Dutch Academy. In support of The Eglantine, Rodenburgh published the Eglentiers Poëtens Borst-Weringh, a discussion of poetics based largely on Sir Philip Sidney's Apologie for Poetrie and Thomas Wilson's Arte of Rhetorique, but also influenced by Lope de Vega's Arte nuevo de hacer comedias en este tiempo (New Art of Writing Plays at This Time).

The first part of King Otto III was published in 1616, and the second and third parts in 1617, but whether it was ever performed is unknown.

Although his plays were very popular in his lifetime, his literary reputation quickly fell into disrepute and neglect, due in part to his use of techniques which were deemed insufficiently classicist. These were not blunders on Rodenburgh's part, but the results of his conscious emulation of Lope de Vega who embraced variety in emotion, plot, character, location, time, and meter ... a far cry from the rationalism and unities of time, place, and plot demanded by neoclassical writers and theorists.

== Adaptations ==
- Casandra Hertoginne van Borgonie, en Karel Baldeus (published 1617) — a tragicomedy, based on Lope de Vega's El perseguido ("The Pursued")
- Hertoginne Celia en Grave Prospero (published 1617) — a comedy, based on Lope de Vega's El molino ("The Miller")
- Jalourse studentin (alternatively entitled Ialoerse Studenten) (published 1617) — a comedy, based on Lope de Vega's La escolástica celosa
- ’t Quaet sijn meester loondt (published 1618) — a comedy, based on Gaspar Aguilar's La venganza honrosa
- Wraeck-gierigers treurspel (published 1618) — a tragedy, based on Thomas Middleton's Revenger's Tragedy
