= Theatre of Van Campen =

Coordinates: 52.3693°N 4.8842°E

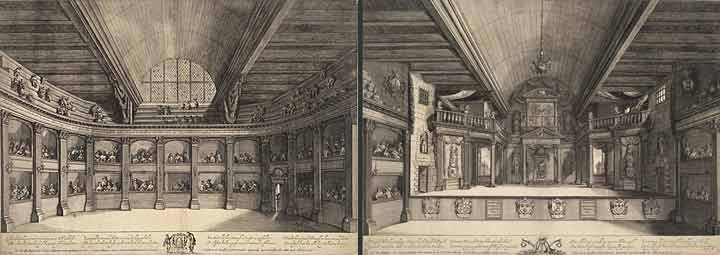
Engravure of the Playhouse Van Campen in 1658 by Salomon Savery

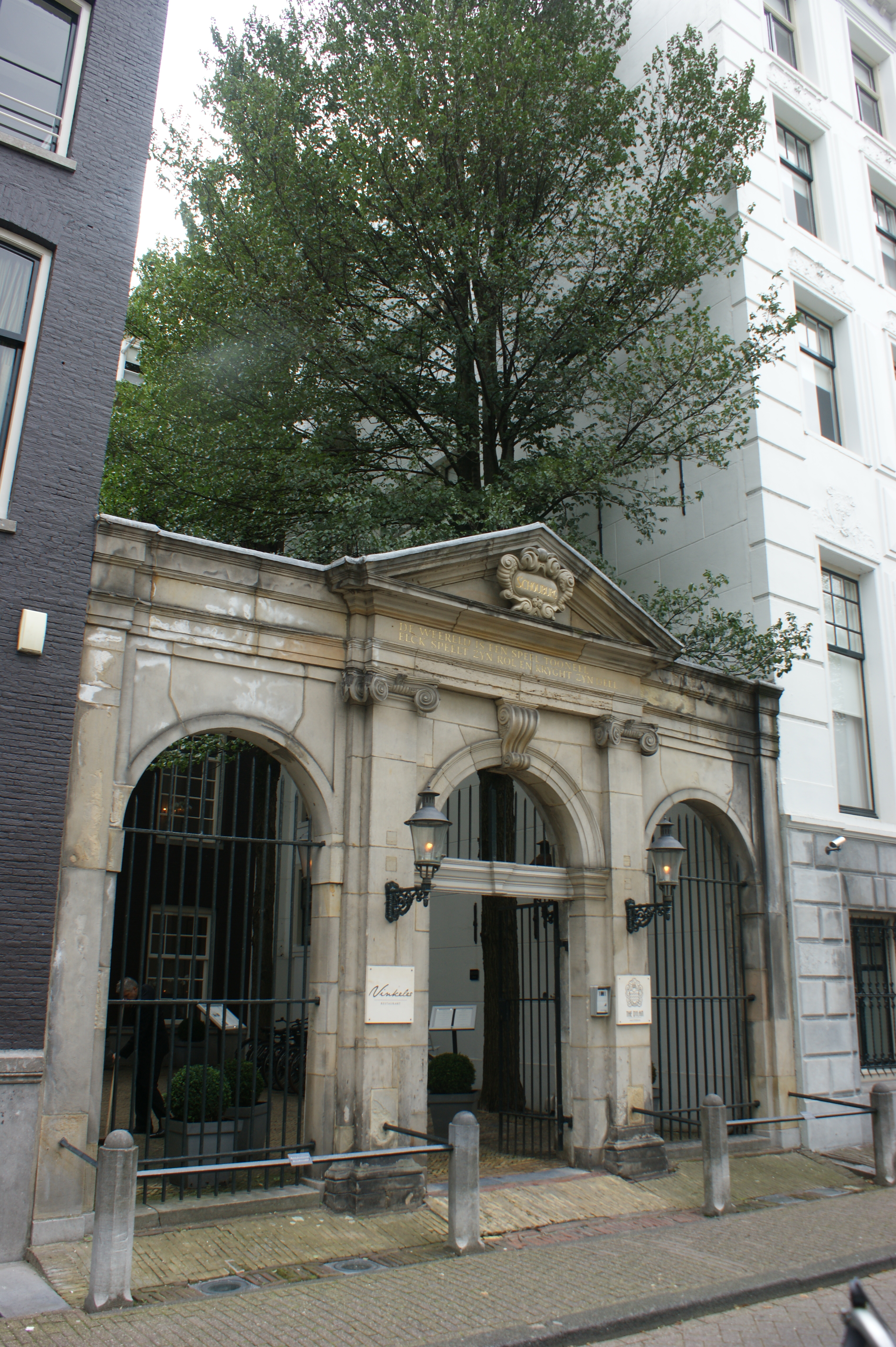
Keizersgracht 384 in Amsterdam, the old entrance gate to the theatre

The Theatre of Van Campen (Dutch: Schouwburg van Van Campen, pronounced [ˈsxʌubʏr(ə)x fɑɱ vɑŋ ˈkɑmpə(n)]) (Note: In isolation, van is pronounced [vɑn].) was a theatre located at Keizersgracht 384 in Amsterdam. It was the first city theatre, based on the Teatro Olimpico in Italy. Since 1999 the building has been occupied by "The Dylan" hotel.

The theatre was built in 1637, by Jacob van Campen, who coined the word Schouwburg for it. It replaced the Duytsche Academy of Samuel Coster previously on the site, originally set up to broaden access to science by putting on lectures in the national vernacular rather than Latin (although other activities also took place, such as painting competitions). Coster, together with playwright Bredero, had had this Academy built as a simple wooden building, to the Italian model, in 1617.

Both Coster and Bredero came from the tradition of Rederijkers, and both were members been of the Rederijker "In Liefde Bloeyende". These societies developed in the early 17th century and, through their study of poetic texts, marked the beginnings of modern theatre in the Netherlands.

Amsterdam was in the midst of her Golden Age, and gradually the possibility a permanent theater building began to be debated. Van Campen, known as an architect and the designer of the Royal Palace, designed a simple permanent theatre, again according to the contemporary Italian example from that time, to replace the Academy. This theatre was due to be opened on 26 December 1637 with Gijsbrecht van Aemstel, a play specially written for the occasion by Vondel. Vondel had also written the text in the architrave of the theatre's entrance:

De weereld is een speeltoneel
Elck speelt zijn rol en krijght zijn deel
(The world is a theatre,
Everyone plays his role and gets his part)

This entrance still survives from the original building.

The Calvinist kerkeraad (church council) of the municipality, however, attempted to stop the theatre opening, but were only temporarily successful, for the theatre was in the end still opened on 3 January 1638, with Vondel's play.

The theater of Van Campen served until 1664, when it became clear it was too small and ill-keeping with the Baroque architecture of the 1660s. The theatre temporarily closed at the outbreak of the Second Anglo-Dutch War and the new building, Schouwburg van Vingboons - twice as large as the old one and adapted to the requirements of that time - finally opened May 26, 1665. This theatre burned in 1772 after a rope caught fire after a performance.
