= Jan Six van Chandelier =

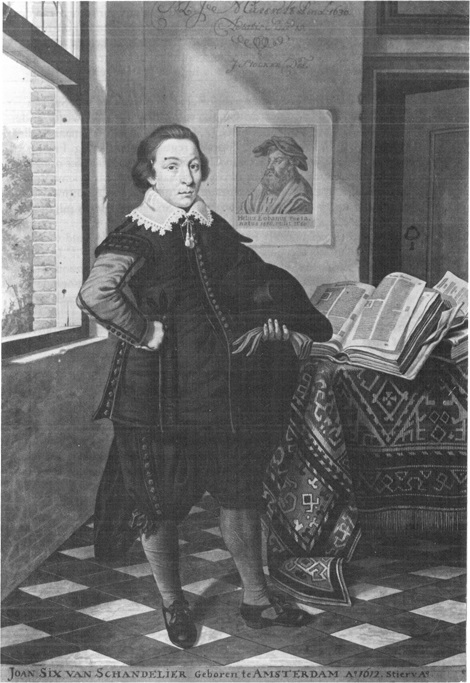
- Jan Six van Chandelier.
- Born: 19 February 1612; Amsterdam
- Died: 16 February 1695 (aged 82); Amsterdam

Jan, Joan, Joannes or Johan Six van Chandelier (1612 – 1695) was a Dutch Golden Age poet from Amsterdam who travelled to Spa, France, Spain, Italy, and England. His collected works were republished in 1991.

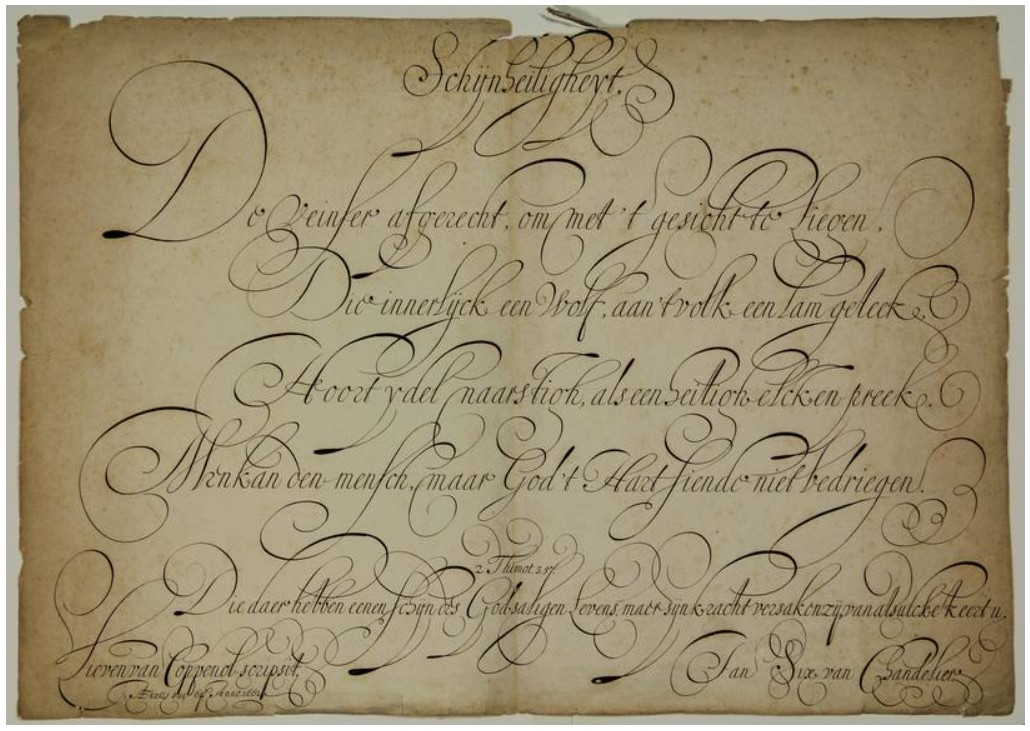
A poem by Jan Six van Chandelier in 1662, written by calligrapher Lieven Willemsz Coppenol

Chandelier was born in Amsterdam as the oldest of 10 children and became a dried goods merchant. For his health, he travelled to Spa in 1650 and for his work he travelled further, writing poems wherever he was. Though his poetry was not his main occupation, he was appreciated by contemporaries who mentioned his works. He was friends with H.L. Spiegel and Anslo. He also wrote a 'confession' to the playwright Jan Six, regent of the heerlijkheid of Vromade and Oudscheepen for his Muiderberg, which is a reference to his friend P.C. Hooft, who lived at Muiderslot and is known for the Muiderkring of writers.

Chandelier died in Amsterdam on 16 February 1695.

== Works ==
- 's Amsterdammers winter, 1650
- Spa-gedichten, 1656
- Poësy, 1657 (listed as a key text in the Canon of Dutch Literature)
- Davids Psalmen, 1674
- Erkentenisse, aan den eedelen heer Joan Six, heer van Vromaade, Oudscheepen, voor synen Muiderberg, 1676
