= Egelantier =

Chamber of rhetoric in Amsterdam, Netherlands

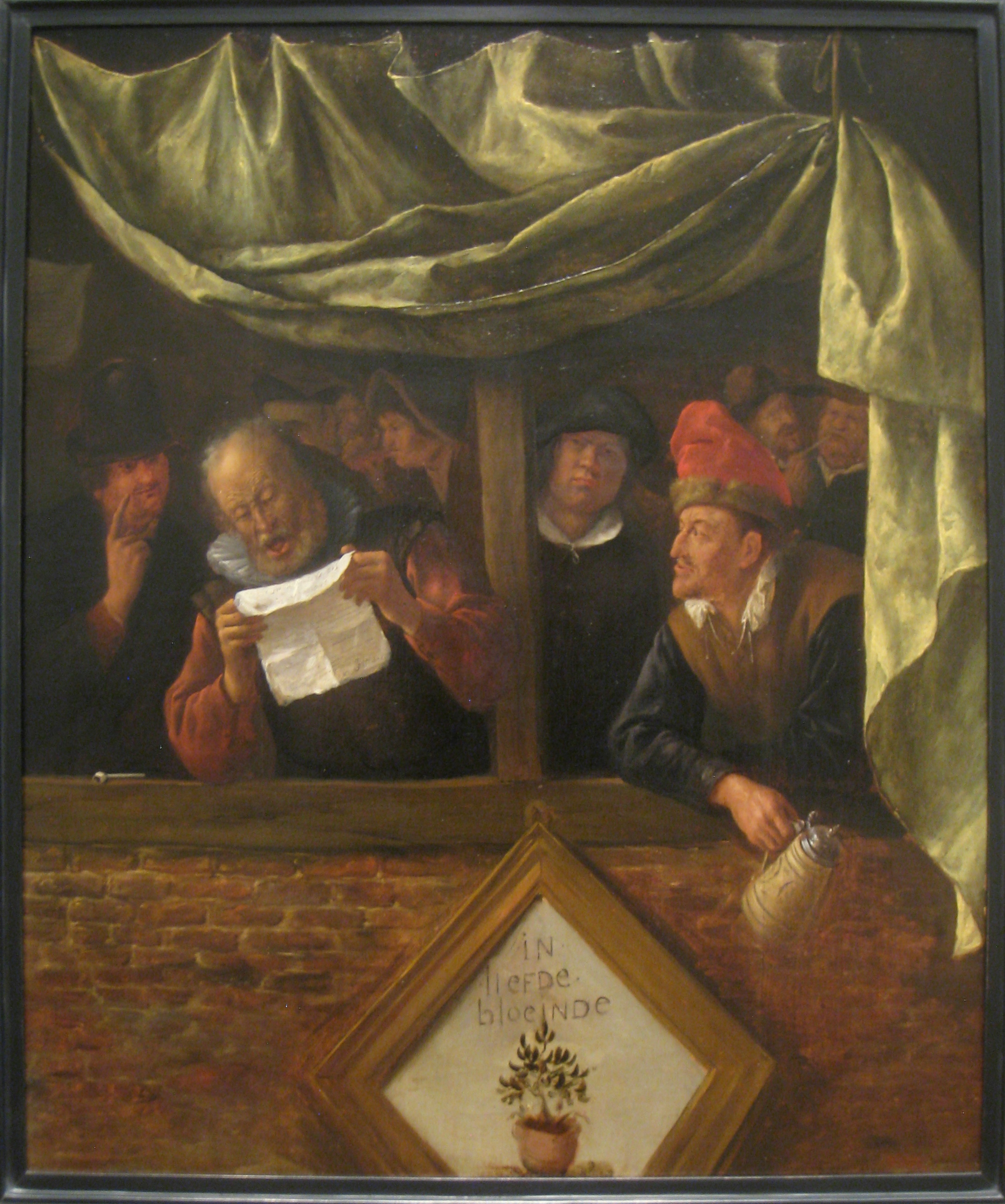
The Rhetoricians, circa 1655, by Jan Steen. The painting depicts a rederijker reading his poem, while hanging over the balcony the blason of his chamber of rhetoric can be seen; in this case the Amsterdam society "Egelantier", whose symbol was an Eglantine rose and whose motto was "In Liefde Bloeiend".

De Eglantier (Sweet Briar or Eglantine Rose) (spelling variations: Egelantier and Eglentier) was a chamber of rhetoric in Amsterdam that arose in 1517 or 1518, possibly as a continuation of older chambers of rhetoric. It is one of the most famous chambers of rhetoric. Its insignia consisted of a thriving Eglantine Rose ("Wild Rose", a symbol of love) in the form of a cross from which a Christ Figure was hanging. The corresponding slogan was "In Love, Flourishing". The name derives from a romantic reference to the poem Beatrijs, where the lovers met by the wild rose. One of the most important leaders of the chamber was Hendrik Laurenszoon Spiegel. Other prominent members were Laurens Reael, Roemer Visscher and Dirck Volckertszoon Coornhert.

== History ==
Much of what is known today about this society comes from the city and guild archives, where it is first mentioned in the 1490s. In 1518 it was mentioned as the "old" social drama society of the city, when it received an annual grant from the city. In the 1520s they participated in several city festivities and produced a play on the story of Pyramus and Thisbe.

The society was popular throughout the latter half of the 16th century and many noted artists were members, though it received little patronage from the city, not even during the joyous entry of Charles V in 1549. Scholars have put this down to the reformist nature of the plays and poems produced during this period, which made political patronage dangerous.

During the Dutch Revolt, the chambers of rhetoric were closed altogether by the Spanish Governor of the Netherlands, the Duke of Alba, but in 1578 the Eglantier was re-established as a result of the Alteration of Amsterdam, in which the Catholic city government was overthrown. After the Fall of Antwerp in 1585 the influx of many gifted poets from the south caused the Eglantier to grow in numbers, which also caused the creation of competing chambers of rhetoric, such as Het Wit Lavendel in 1598 (where, amongst others Joost van den Vondel was active), after which the Eglantier became known as the 'Old Chamber'. After 1610, there were internal difficulties in the Eglantier, and in 1617 Samuel Coster and a group of members broke away and founded the chamber of rhetoric Duytsche Academie. After this departure, the Eglantier appointed Theodore Rodenburgh chairman. But in 1630 Het Wit Lavendel and the Duytsche Academie merged and only two years later, on July 7, 1632, the burgomasters of Amsterdam merged this chamber of rhetoric with the Eglantier into a new chamber of rhetoric, named the Amsterdamsche Kamer, but in sources it also appears under the names De Vergulden Byekorf, Bloeyende Eglantier and Academie, with the motto "Through fervor in love, flourishing". Not every rhetorician agreed with the merger, and Jan Harmensz. Krul founded the Musijckkamer in 1634, which however went bankrupt a year later, in 1635. The Amsterdamsche Kamer was led in its early years by Willem Dircksz. Hooft, Steven Vennecool, Heereman Dircksz. Coorenkind, Johan Meurs and Meyndert Voskuyl. In 1637, the first theater in Amsterdam, the Schouwburg of Van Campen, was founded through the chamber of rhetoric. Not much is known on further events of the chamber of rhetoric. A list of leaders of the chamber is known from 1664 (one year before the construction of the 'New Theatre'), including Cornelis Withenoon, Jan Vos, Tobias van Domselaer, Jacob van der Poel and Cornelis de Vries.

== Publications ==
- In 1602 the songbook Den Nieuwen Lusthof
- In 1610 Den Bloemhof
- In 1615 Apollo
