= Chandelier (surname) =

Chandelier is a French surname. Notable people with the surname include:

- Jan Six van Chandelier (1612–1695), Dutch Golden Age poet from Amsterdam
- Paul Chandelier (1892–1983), French footballer
