= Anna Visscher =

Dutch artist (c. 1583–1651)

Anna Roemers Visscher (c. 2 February 1583 – 6 December 1651) was a Dutch artist, poet, and translator.

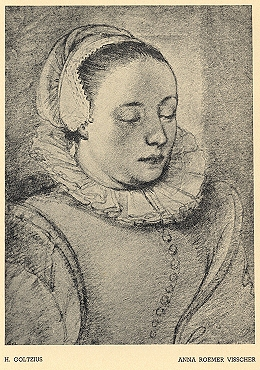
Drawing with imaginary title Anna Roemers Visscher

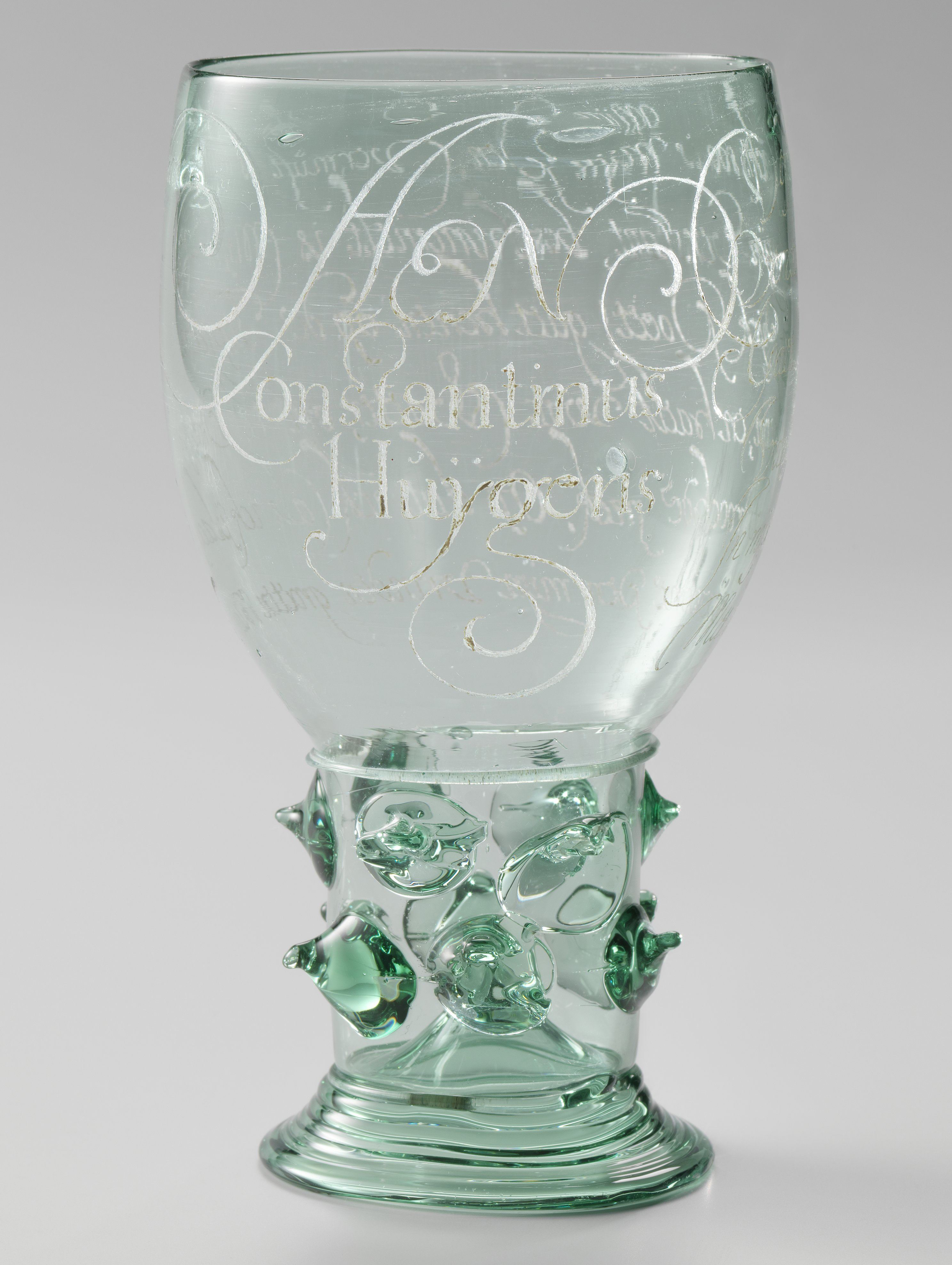
Anna Roemers Visscher: Rummer with an engraved poem on Constantijn Huygens, 1619, Rijksmuseum BK-1983-15

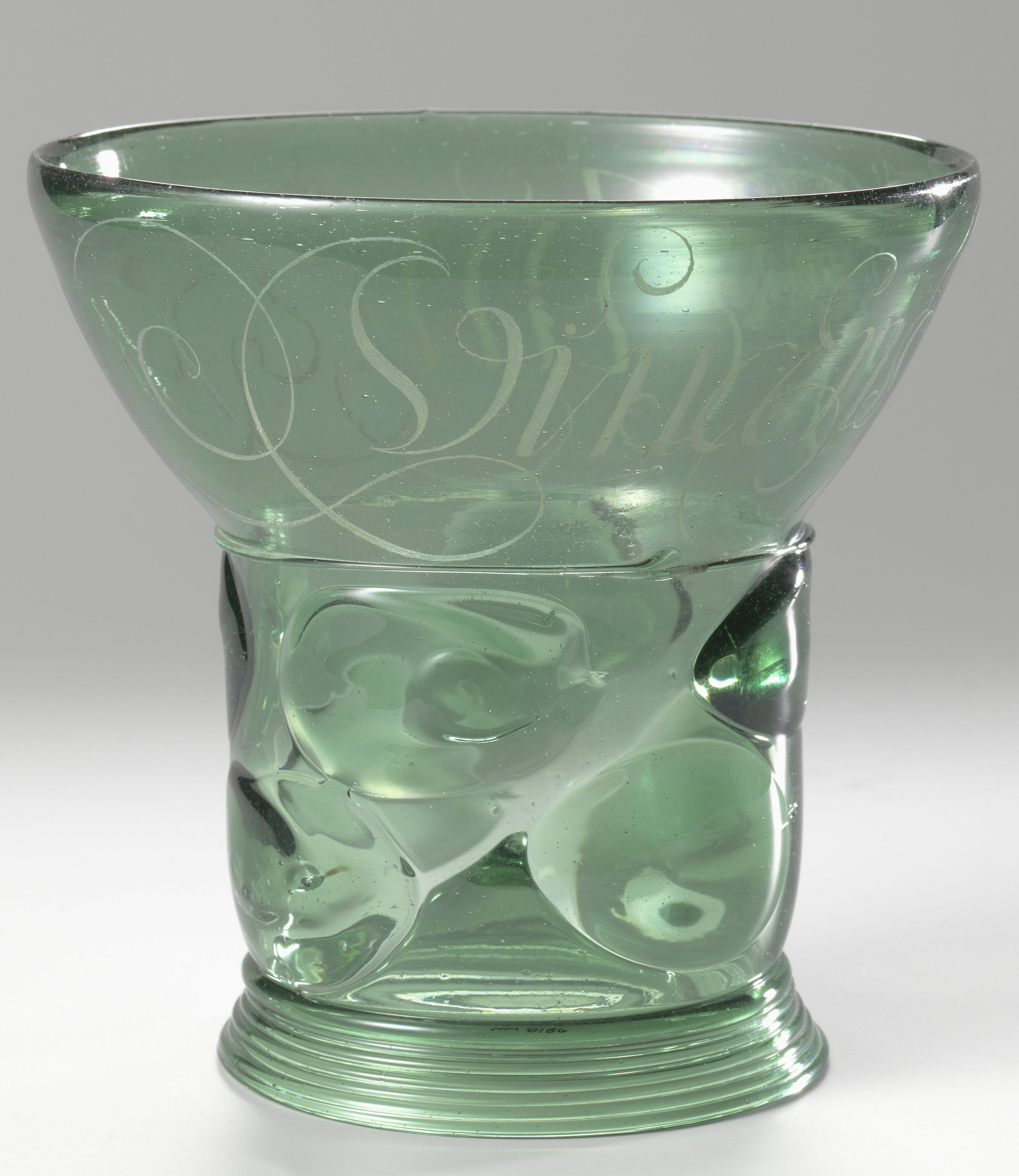
Berkemeyer tumbler engraved by Visscher in 1646

== Biography ==
Anna Roemers Visscher was the eldest daughter of Amsterdam merchant and poet Roemer Visscher and the sister of Maria Tesselschade Visscher. Her family's economic and social status in Amsterdam enabled Visscher to be schooled in languages, calligraphy, embroidery, drawing, painting, glass engraving and other arts.

Visscher married Dominicus Booth van Wesel in 1624. In 1646, they moved with their two sons Roemer and Johan to Leiden.

Visscher lived during the Renaissance when women poets were often praised for who they were more than for their literary work. She was amongst the group of artists, writers and musicians who formed the Muiderkring or Muiden Circle. She was highly admired by the artistic elite such as P. C. Hooft, Jacob Cats, Joost van den Vondel, Constantijn Huygens and others. They called her a muse, the second Sappho, a fourth grace and more, and often dedicated works to her. Jacob Cats, for example, dedicated Maagdeplicht (The Duties of a Maiden) to Visscher. The Flemish painter Peter Paul Rubens dedicated an engraving of his Susanna and the Elders, executed by Michel Lasne (ca. 1617–18) under Rubens's supervision, to Anna Visscher; the inscription praises her virtue. A second engraving, executed by Lucas Vorsterman (1620) after another of Rubens's Susanna and the Elders, carries the same dedication from Rubens to Visscher.

Visscher is particularly regarded for her diamond-point glass engraving. Additionally, she had an apparent interest in emblem books, as she translated into Dutch thirteen epigrams from Georgette de Montenay's Emblèmes, ou devises chrestiennes of 1584 Manuscripts Catalogue. She also contributed poetry to the 1618 emblem book, Silenus Alcibiadis, Sive Proteus K. ter Laan, Letterkundig woordenboek voor Noord en Zuid · dbnl by Jacob Cats. She was a contemporary and friend of Anna Maria van Schurman.

Visscher died in Alkmaar, at the home of her sister Maria.
