= Maria Tesselschade Visscher =

Dutch artist (1594–1649)

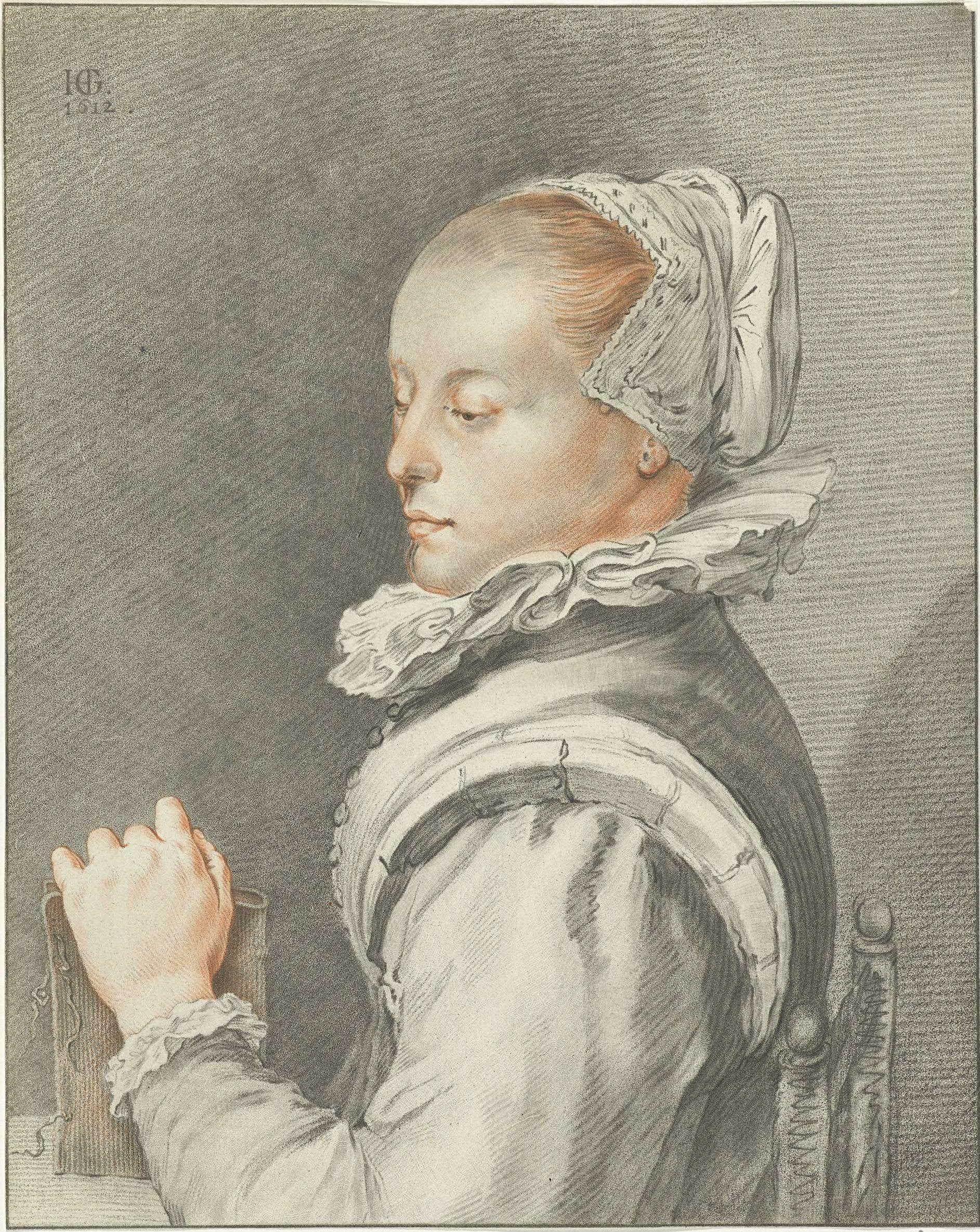
- Portrait of Visscher, 1770 copy of a 1612 original by Hendrick Goltzius
- Born: Maria Tesselschade Roemers Visscher; 25 March 1594; Amsterdam, Dutch Republic
- Died: 20 June 1649 (aged 55)
- Occupations: Poet; engraver
- Movement: Dutch Golden Age
- Spouse: Allard Crombalch (m. 1623; died 1634)
- Father: Roemer Visscher
- Relatives: Anna Visscher (sister)
- Elected: Muiderkring

Maria Tesselschade Roemers Visscher (25 March 1594 – 20 June 1649), also called Maria Tesselschade Roemersdochter Visscher (Dutch pronunciation: [maːˈrijaː ˈtɛsəlˌsxaːdə ˈrumərzˌdɔxtər ˈvɪsər]), was a Dutch poet and glass engraver.

== Life ==
Tesselschade was born in Amsterdam, the youngest of three daughters of poet and humanist Roemer Visscher. She was given the name Tesselschade ("Damage on Tessel"), because her father lost ships near the Dutch island Texel on Christmas Eve 1593, three months before her birth, to remember that 'worldly wealth could be gone instantly.'

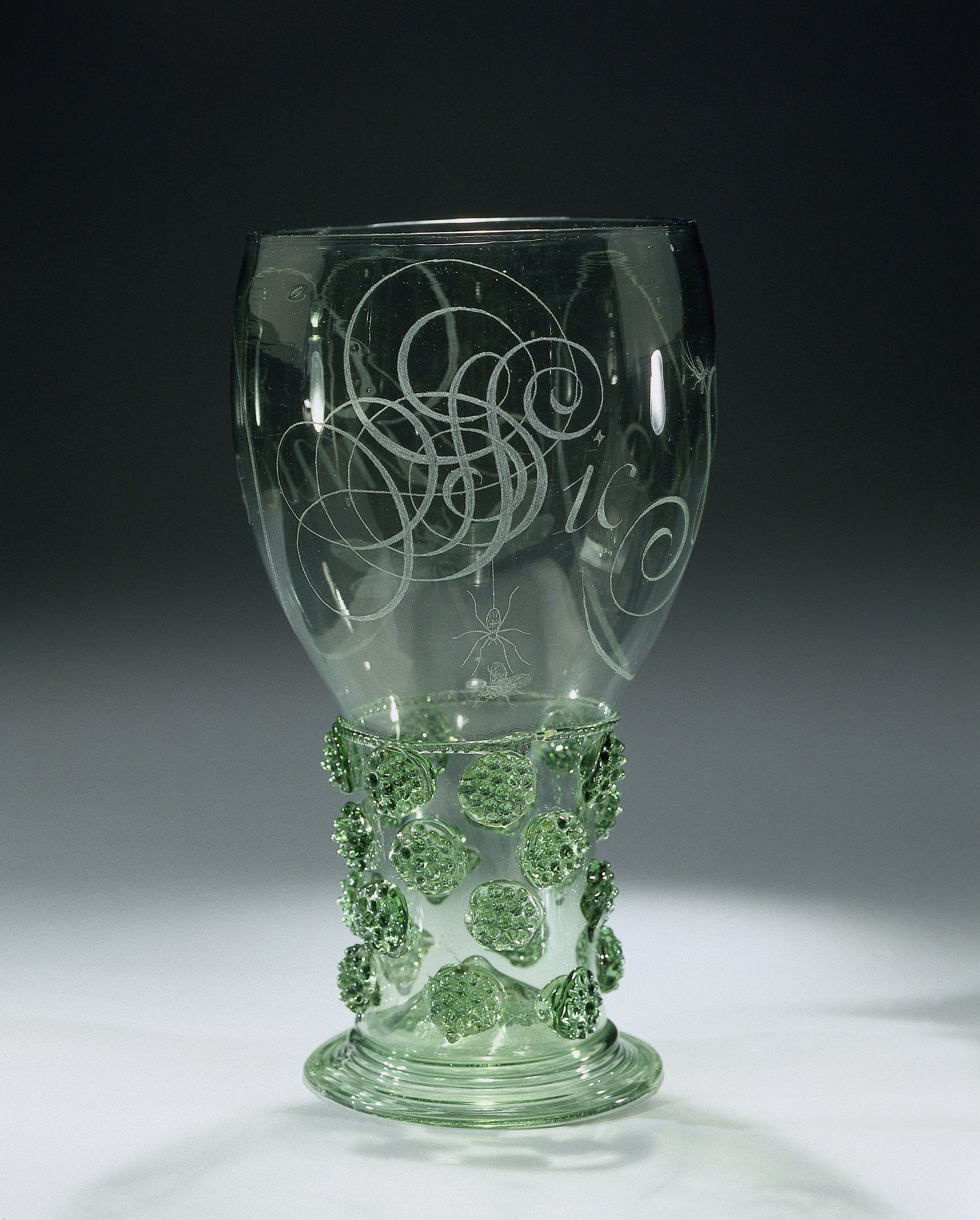
Engraved rummer attributed to Maria Tesselschade Roemers Visscher

She and her sister, Anna, were the only female members of the Muiderkring, the group of Dutch Golden Age intellectuals who met at Muiden Castle. She is often characterised as a muse of the group and attracted the admiration of its members, such as its organiser Hooft, Huygens, Barlaeus, Bredero, Heinsius, Vondel and Jacob Cats.

In their correspondence, she is described as attractive, musically talented, and a skilled translator and commentator from French and Italian. They also praised her skill at singing, painting, carving, glass engraving and tapestry work.

The Rijksmuseum Amsterdam has an example of her engraving work, a römer drinking glass engraved with the motto Sic Soleo Amicos ("this is how I treat my friends").

In 1623, she married a ship's officer, Allard Crombalch. After he died in 1634, Huygens and Barlaeus proposed marriage to her, offers which she rejected.

== Legacy ==
In remembrance of Tesselschade there are several streets named after her, such as Tesselschadestraat and Tesselschadelaan in Alkmaar, Eindhoven, Amsterdam, Zwolle, Leiden and Leeuwarden.
