= Roemer Visscher =

Dutch merchant and underwriter

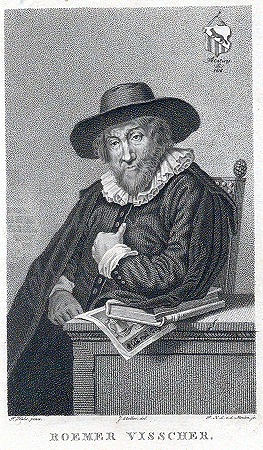
Imaginary portrait of Roemer Visscher

Drawing of the coat of arms of Roemer Visscher

Roemer Pieterszoon Visscher (1547 – 19 February 1620) was a successful Dutch merchant, the first Dutch underwriter and writer of the Dutch Golden Age.

== Life ==
Visscher was born in and lived in Amsterdam and was an important and central figure of the cultural scene there and member of the rederijkerskamer De Eglantier with as slogan "In liefde bloeiende" ("Blossoming in love"). Other members of this scene were the Dutch writers P.C. Hooft, Bredero and Vondel. Vondel called Visschers house "het saligh Roemers huys" ("delightful house of Roemer"), because artists of all kinds visited his house on the Gelderse Kade in Amsterdam, varying from painters to poets. Roemer was the father of three daughters Maria Tesselschade Visscher, Gertruid, and Anna Visscher.

== Works ==
The humanistic and moralistic content of his works belongs to the period of the Renaissance, although the form was more conservative and characteristic to the rederijkers. Visscher was a specialist in the epigram, but he also wrote emblemata. The emblemata is a genre in which pictures are accompanied by one or two rhyming sentences. An example of the emblemata is Visschers Sinnepoppen. One emblema is called "Elck wat wils" which is still a common expression in Dutch, meaning "To each his own".

Among his works are:

- T'loff vande mutse, ende van een blaewe scheen (1612)
- Brabbeling (1614)
- Sinnepoppen (1614)
