= Granida =

Play by Pieter Corneliszoon Hooft

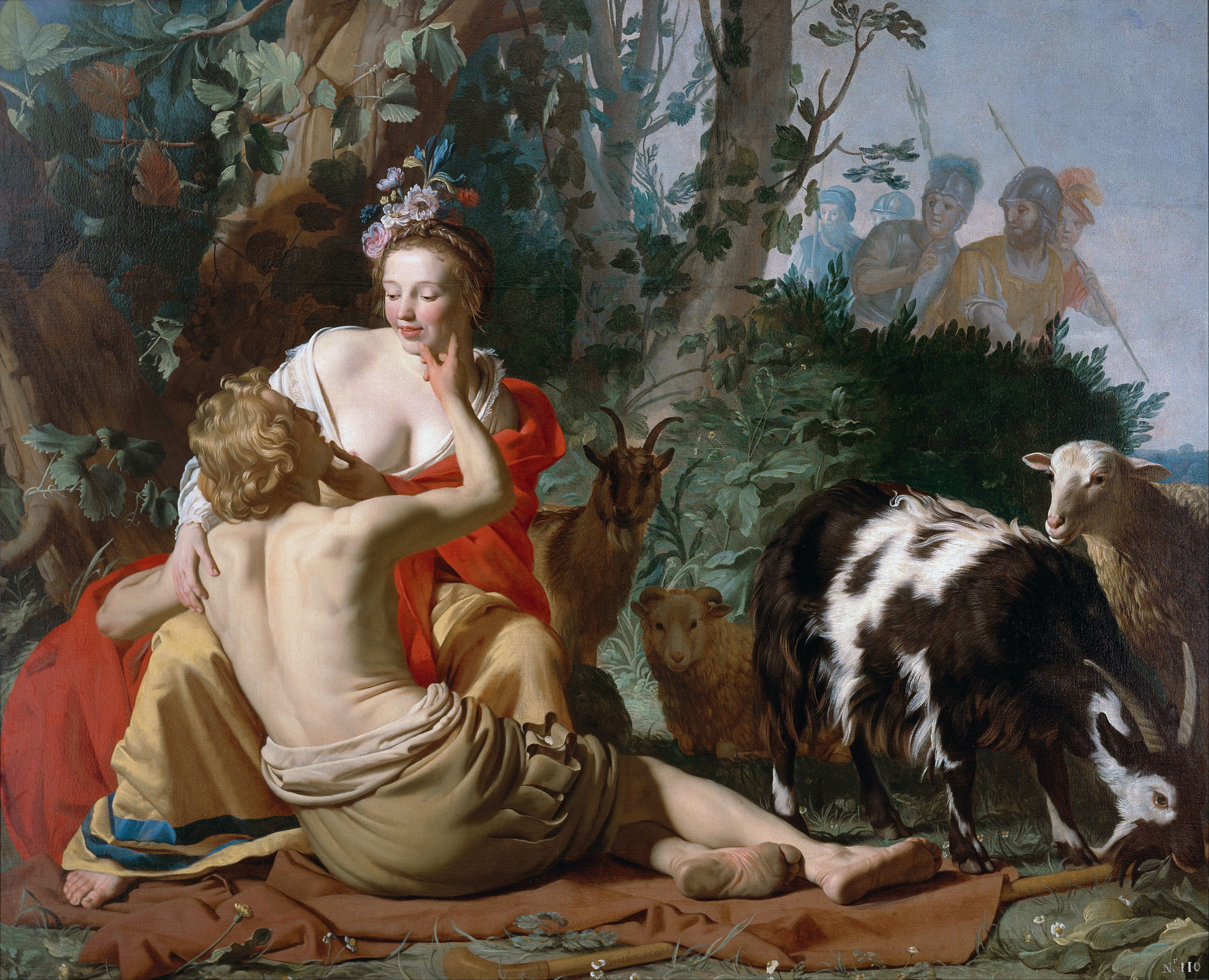
Gerard van Honthorst, Granida and Daifilo, 1625

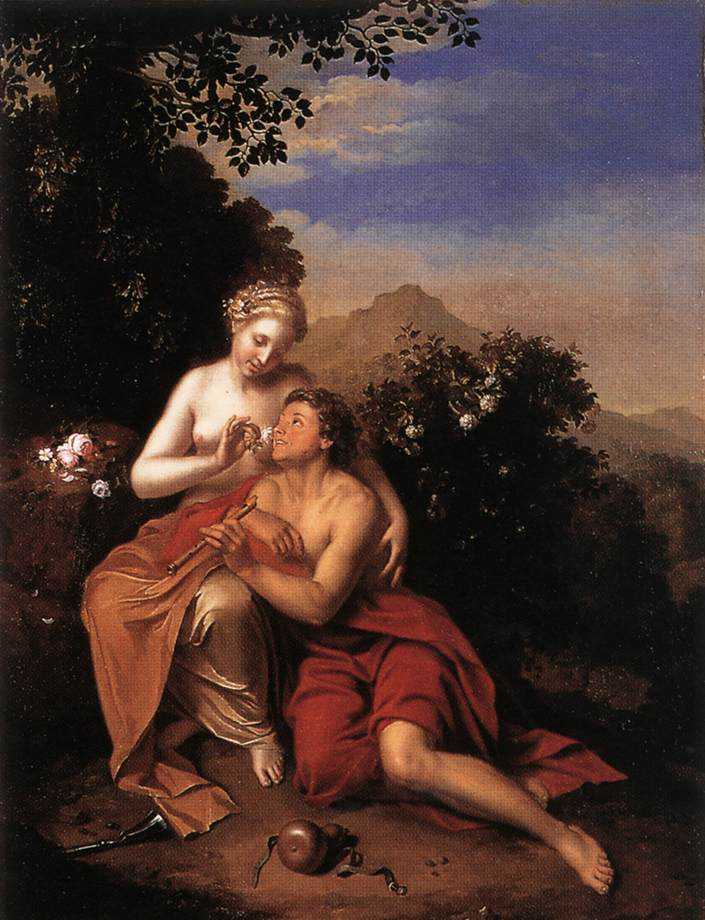
Pieter van der Werff, Granida and Daifilo (1711)

Granida is a Dutch language pastoral play by Pieter Corneliszoon Hooft, written 1603–1605 and published in 1615.

It was one of the most popular plays of the Dutch Renaissance and Golden Age literature and the subject of many Dutch paintings.
