= Lieven Willemsz van Coppenol =

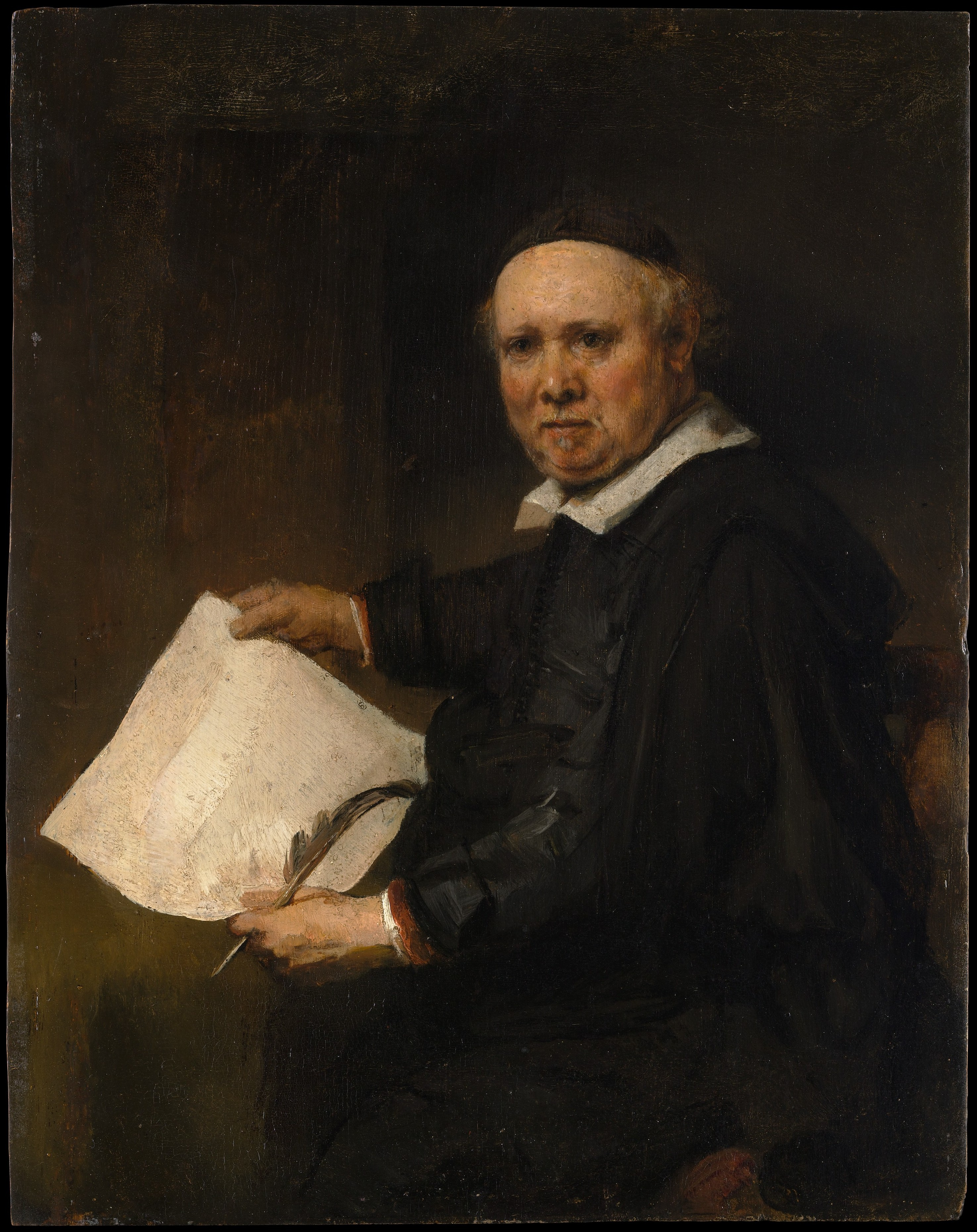
- Portrait of Lieven Willemsz van Coppenol by Rembrandt in 1658
- Born: ca 1599

Lieven Willemsz van Coppenol (ca. 1599 – after June 1671) was a Dutch calligrapher and graphic designer best known today for his portrait and etchings by Rembrandt.

He was born in Leiden as the son of Willem Willemsz. van Coppenol (ca 1570-1636) and Engeltie Willemsdr (ca 1570-1646), who temporarily moved to Leiden but decided for unknown reason to return to Haarlem. His grandfather, a Mennonite came from Thielt (Flanders) and fled to Haarlem in 1579. His father, "Maitre Guillaume", was a French schoolmaster between 1611 and 1630 but became blind. By 1619 Lieven had moved to Amsterdam and married Maritje or Mayke Teunis van Essen, a widow with four children, both Mennonites. She was 20 years older and ran a private school, nowadays Singel 234. The couple had two sons called Lieve and Pieter, born in 1623 and 1624. (For obvious reasons all the births are not registered.)

His wife died in 1643 and Lieven remarried in 1644 to Grietje Andries Schaepherder; in September he sold the house (and the school) for 18,000 guilders to his neighbor, David Rutgers, a mennonite silk trader. When his son Lieve married he was living at Nieuwendijk. When his son Pieter married, who became a bailiff in Naarden, he was again living at Singel. In 1650 the curious writer suddenly went mad, and was kept tied on bed.

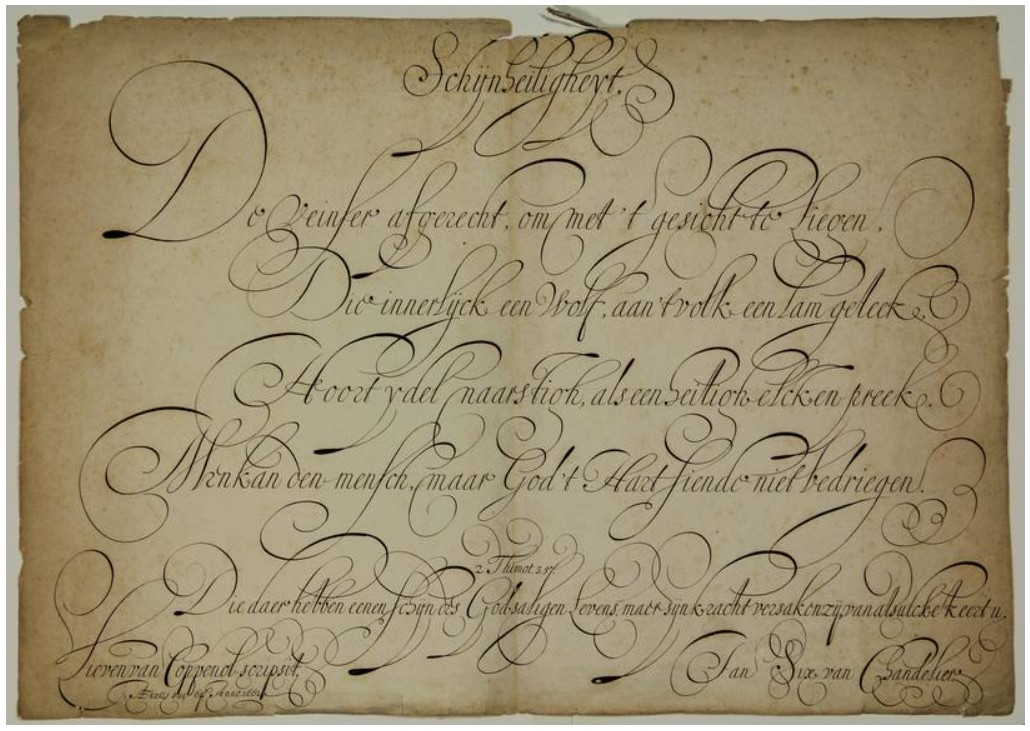
A poem by Jan Six van Chandelier in 1662, calligraphied by Coppenol

Lieven regularly commissioned portraits of himself and then asked prominent poets as Vondel and Jacob Cats to write accompanying laudatory poems. In 1656 he was invited by the mennonite deacons explaining his pub crawls and brothel visits. In 1657 Constantijn Huygens wrote some of these verses, one of them in Latin. Coppenol lived at Molenpad near Keizersgracht, where his wife died in May 1661. Coppenol started an affair with Jannetje Blocq, to whom he had made promises of marriage. She went to the court and when they came to an agreement in 1669 he didn't have to marry her.

He had several poems written in his honor, presumably as a return favor for writing the poems of poets on wall decorations and engraved plates. Several of his writing examples have been preserved. His "schoonschrift" as calligraphy was called was recorded for various objects, most notably a poem in the Amsterdam town hall that was written by Cornelia Pluvier, a poet married to the still-life painter Willem Kalf. Besides teaching, he travelled to clients to sell his work, pulling a hand cart with writing examples for inspiration. His son Lieven Coppenol, who managed the belongings of his father, was buried June 1671 in Westerkerk.
