= Muiderkring =

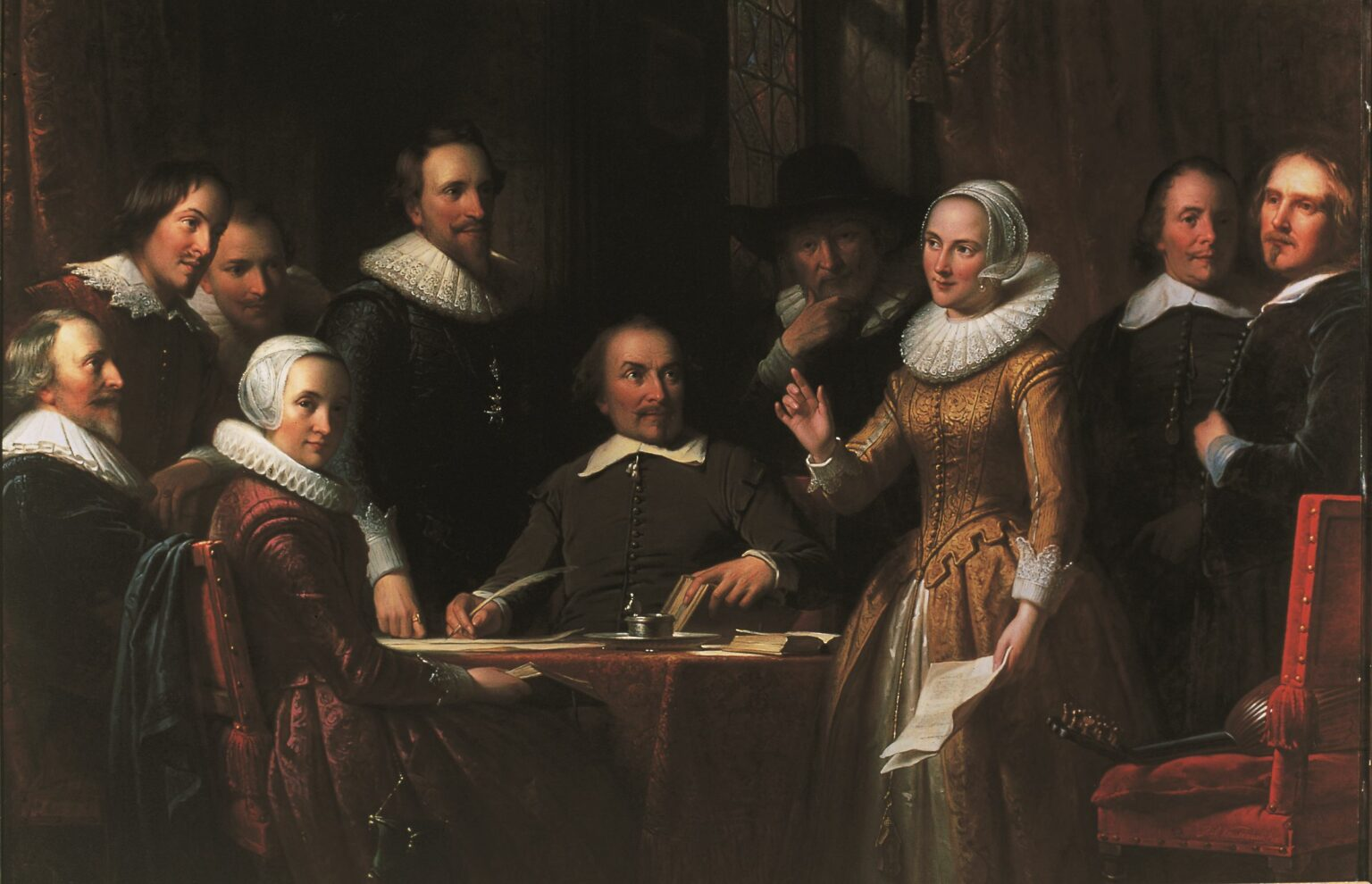
The artists of the Muiden Circle painted by Jan Adam Kruseman (1852)

The Muiderkring (Muiden Circle) was the name given to a group of figures in the arts and sciences who regularly met at the castle of Muiden near Amsterdam during the first half of the 17th century, or the Golden Age of the Dutch Republic. The central figure of the Muiderkring was the poet Pieter Corneliszoon Hooft; Constantijn Huygens, Dirck Sweelinck, Vondel, Bredero and the poet sisters Anna Visscher and Maria Tesselschade Visscher were also considered part of the group.

Some music connected with the circle was recorded by the Utrecht ensemble Camerata Trajectina in 1994.
