= Farce of the Cow =

Dutch play by Gerbrand Bredero

De klucht van de koe or The Farce of the Cow is a Dutch farce from 1612 written by Gerbrand Bredero.

== Plot ==
A farmer is tricked by a con man: the con man asks the farmer to sell him a cow because he urgently needs money. However, the swindler stole this cow from the farmer. And while the farmer sells his own cow to another farmer, the thief has food and drink brought in at an inn. The farmer comes to the inn with the money from the sale and is treated by the swindler, who then leaves without paying. To prevent it from being told how he fell into the trap, the farmer eventually also has to pay the outstanding bills of the inn.
