= Hendrik Laurenszoon Spiegel =

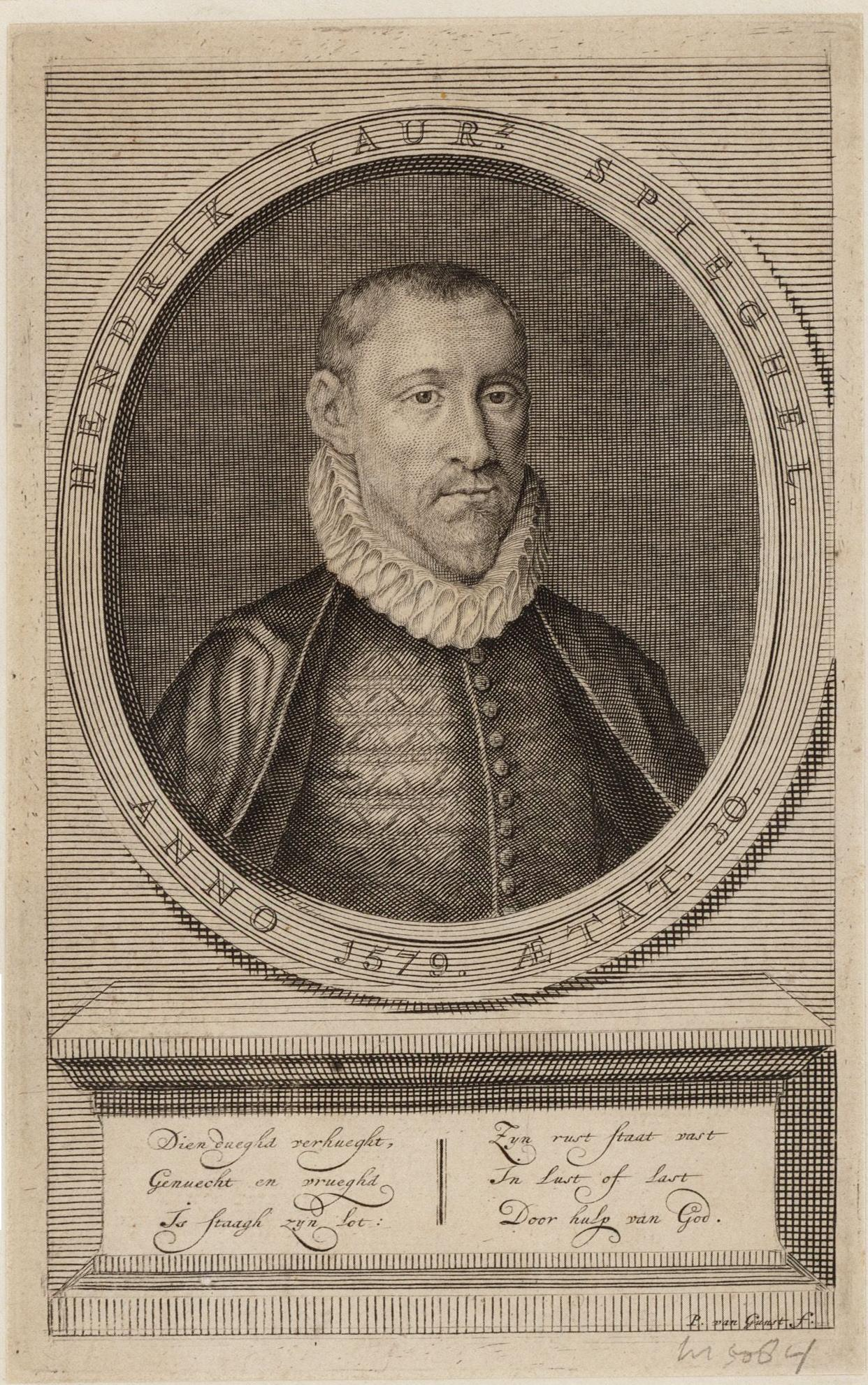

Hendrik Laurenszoon Spiegel (11 March 1549 – 4 January 1612) was one of the most important writers and thinkers from Amsterdam in the second half of the sixteenth century.

Spiegel was born in Amsterdam and is seen as a forerunner to the Golden Age of Vondel, Hooft and Huygens. He is the strongest candidate for the unknown author of the first book on Dutch grammar, the Twe-spraack (Twe-spraack vande Nederduitsche letterkunst), which appeared in 1584. (In the past it was thought to be by his friend, Dirck Volckertszoon Coornhert.)

He was a rederijker and founding member of the rhetorician's chamber called the Egelantier. On ethics, he wrote "Hertspiegel" (a summary of a more complex work), and a short play, "Numa", on the Roman king Numa Pompilius.

His sister Geertrui married the Alkmaar regent Pieter Adriaansz Pauw, his sister Mary was one of the founders of the Amsterdam Maagdenhuis, a Catholic girl's orphanage, and his brother Jan became one of the first regents of Amsterdam after the Alteratie. Spiegel was married twice, first to Bregtje van der Berg and Dieuwertje van Marken. When his children contracted chicken pox, his wife kept him away because he had not had it in his youth, but he could not bear being separated from them and thus became ill and died of the chicken pox in Alkmaar, aged 62. His daughter Geertrui married the Amsterdam lawyer Ysbrand van der Hem, and his sons were later the founders of the Amsterdam regency families Backer and Lestevenon.

== Bibliography ==
- A. Verwey, Hendrick Laurensz. Spieghel, Groningen 1919.
- J.F. Buisman, De ethische denkbeelden van Hendrik Laurensz. Spiegel, Wageningen 1935.
- K. Kooiman, Twe-spraack vande Nederduitsche letterkunst, Groningen 1913.
- G.R.W. Dibbets (ed.), Twe-spraack vande Nederduitsche letterkunst (1584), Assen/Maastricht 1985.
- Bostoen, Kaars en bril: de oudste Nederlandse grammatica, z.p., z.j. [1985].
