= Samuel Coster =

Dutch doctor

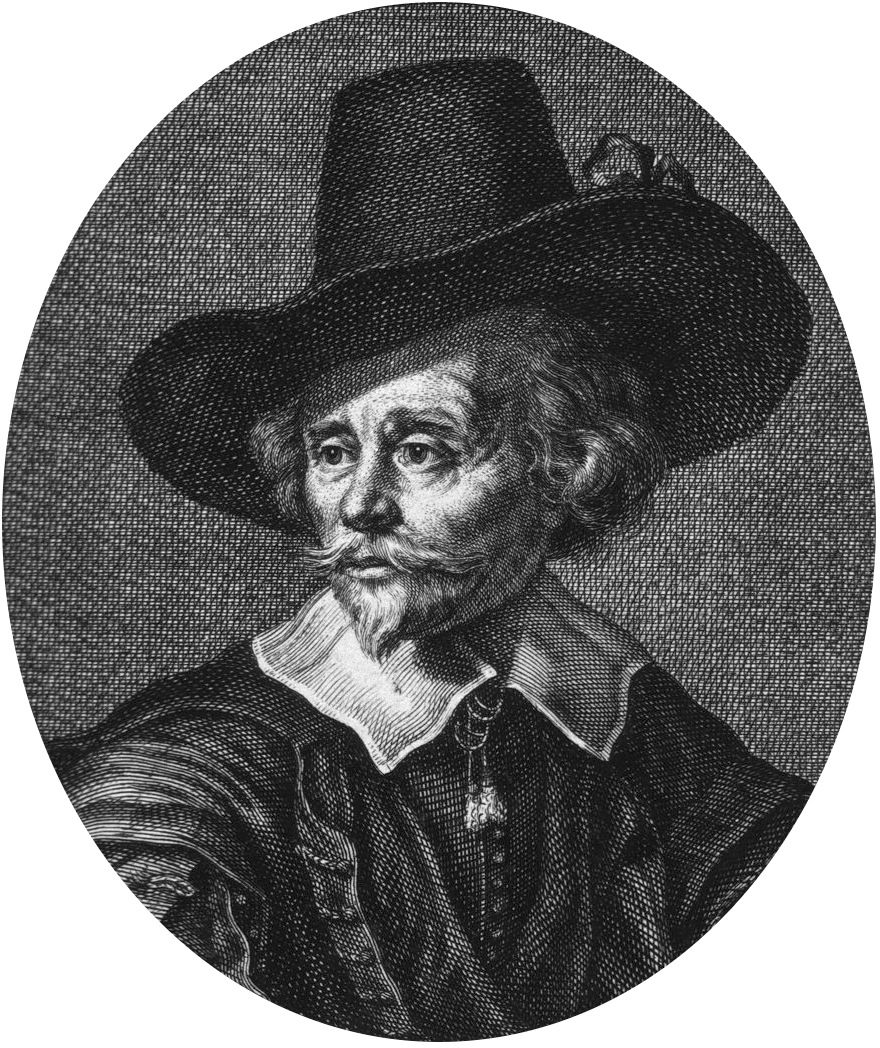
Samuel Coster

Samuel Coster (1 September 1579, Amsterdam – 1665) was a Dutch playwright.

Coster was the fifth child of Adriaen Lennaertz, sexton and carpenter, and Aeltgen Jansd. By around 1605, he was a member of the Amsterdam rederijkerskamer "De Eglantier". Presumably he was helped into the society by rich friends, but then got himself to Leiden University in 1607. He began as a student of the humanities, but he graduated in 1610 as a doctor in medicine. He was appointed a physician at the Hospital on his return to Amsterdam.

Coster for 10 years played a leading role in the literary life of Amsterdam, making his name in the theatre. "Teeuwis de boer" (Teeuwis the farmer), a comedy in all probability already written during his years in Leiden, was in 1612 put on by "De Eglantier". Inspired by the national anthem, Coster laid out in it comical motives and characters: a voluptuous man married with an old woman, a farmer opposite a city-dweller, a bragging Westfaals talking with a bald nobleman, and a sly and knowing French lawyer. In 1613 the "Spel van Tiisken vander Schilden" (Play of Tiisken vander Schilden) appeared, at first anonymous but later attributed to Coster on the basis of stylistic resemblance with other works of his.

The first 'classical' tragedy in Dutch has been written also by Coster: "Ithys", probably put on by "Eglantier" in 1615. Although largely in the pastoral style, it is an extremely bloody drama, take from one of the cruellest episodes in Ovid's Metamorphoses: the story of Tereus and Procne.

Around 1615, the "De Eglantier" began to break up, with pressures from old versus new, Dutch versus foreign, self-praise versus critical talent. Hooft's attempts to reconstruct it came to nothing. The final break came in 1617, when a small group of talented members led by Coster, Hooft and Bredero split off to found the 'Duytsche Academy'. The intention was to practice not only poetry and theatre, but also to organize scientific research lectures in Dutch, unlike the universities of Leiden, Franeker, Harderwijk and Groningen, which gave their classes at that time in Latin.

In November 1617, a new classical drama of Coster was performed: "Iphigenia". The drama was a disguised criticism of the current religious disputes and fanatical drive of the Calvanistic preachers, making these preachers protest to the mayor of Amsterdam and getting him to declare (wrongly) that the Academie was anticlerical. Successful productions of plays like Bredero's "Spaanschen Brabander" and Hooft's "Warenar" could do nothing to change this.

The death of Bredero in August 1618, combined with tragic political events that very same month and the execution of Oldenbarnevelt in May 1619, limited the Academy's chances.

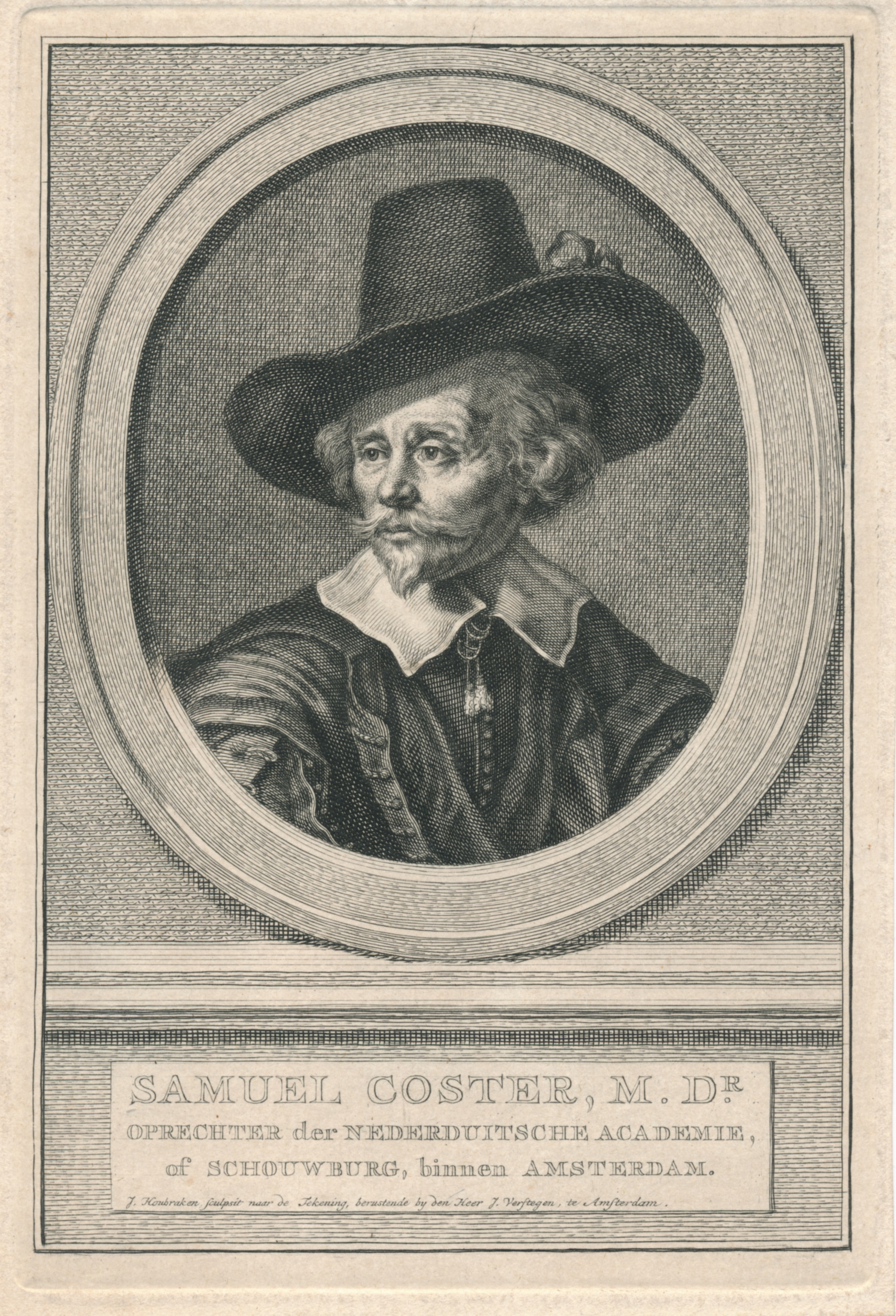
Samuel Coster, 18th century engraving by Jacobus Houbraken

Due to his medical work, that took up much of his time, Coster published little in later years, besides revising and reprinting his earlier works. He remained friendly with the aforenamed Amsterdam literary circles, and so the Academy's objectives were finally realised in 1632 and 1637, with the foundation of the Athenaeum Illustre and the new Theater – not founded by Coster himself, but by a younger generation realizing his aims.

== Works ==
- Boere-klucht van Teeuwis de Boer, en men Juffer van Grevelinckhuysen (1612, 1e druk 1627)
- Ithys (1615)
- Spel van de rijckeman (1615)
- Warenar (1617, samen met P.C. Hooft)
- Iphigenia (1617)
- Isabella (tekst tot vers 362 van Hooft) (1619)
- Polyxena (1619)
- Duytsche Academi (1619), gelegenheidsspel
- Ghezelschap der Goden vergaaert op de ghewenste bruyloft van Apollo (1618)
- Nederduytsche Academijs Niemant ghenoemt, niemant gheblameert (1620)
