= First Dutch Academy =

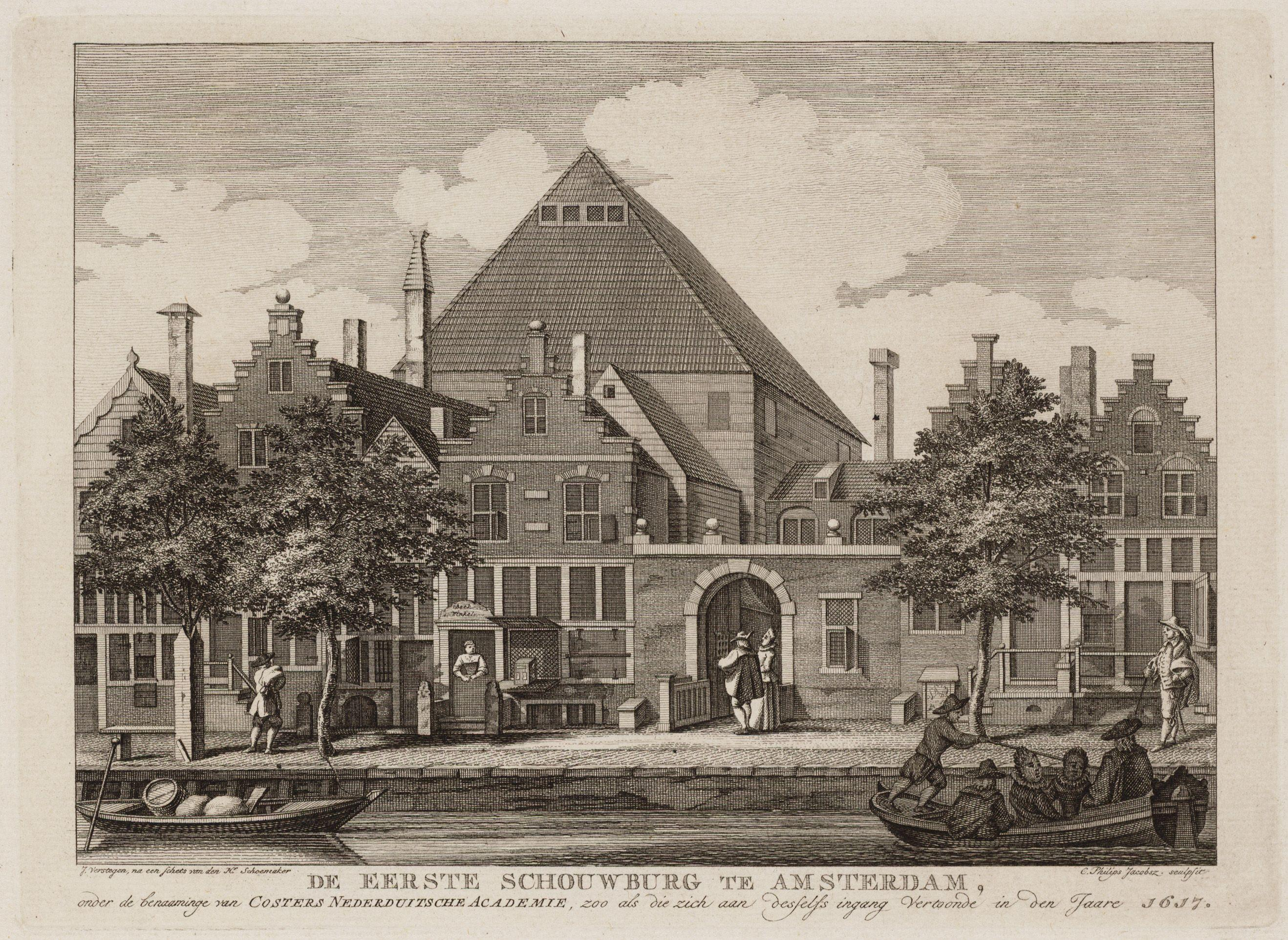
An image of the First Dutch Academy

The First Dutch Academy (Dutch: Eerste Nederduytsche Academie) was an institution set up by Samuel Coster (with the important support of Bredero and Hooft) in Amsterdam. The institution was set up to offer better theatre than the old rederijkerskamers could then manage. Another (perhaps more important) aim was to offer higher education to common people.

The academy was inaugurated on 23 September 1617 with 'Apollo' by Suffridus Sixtinus, and the tragedy "Vande moordt begaen aen Wilhelm van Orangien" (the murder of William of Orange) by Gijsbert van Hoghendorp. This all occurred in a wooden building. The coat-of-arms of the academy consisted of a beehive under an eglantine with the word "IJver" ("zeal") as a motto.

Calvinistic preachers of that time put pressure on the new institution to close. The theatre did not give in, particularly since its first two professors were Mennonites (Sibrant Hanses Cardinael in Arithmetic and Jan Thonis in Hebrew).

In 1631, Vondel wrote his "Vraghe van d'Amsterdamsche Academi aan alle poëten en dichters" (Questions of the Amsterdam Academics to all poets), provoking further vehement Calvinist reactions. Finally the 'Oeffenschool', that was meant to go with the academy, was founded. The Athenaeum Illustre was later set up in the city, but here no teaching was presented in the native language.

The main figures of the academy wrote comedy and farce:

- Coster: Teeuwis de boer en Tysken vanden Schilde
- Bredero: Lucelle, De Koe, Symen, De Meulenaer, Het Moortje, Spaansche Brabander
- Hooft: Warenar
