= Gerbrand Bredero =

Dutch poet and playwright (1585–1618)

Gerbrand Adriaenszoon Bredero
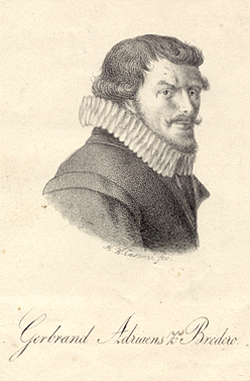
- Portrait of Bredero by H.W. Caspari after an engraving by Hessel Gerritsz
- Born: Gerbrand Adriaenszoon Bredero; 16 March 1585; Amsterdam, Dutch Republic
- Died: 23 August 1618 (aged 33); Amsterdam, Dutch Republic
- Occupations: Poet, playwright
- Writing career
- Language: Dutch
- Literary movement: De Egelantier

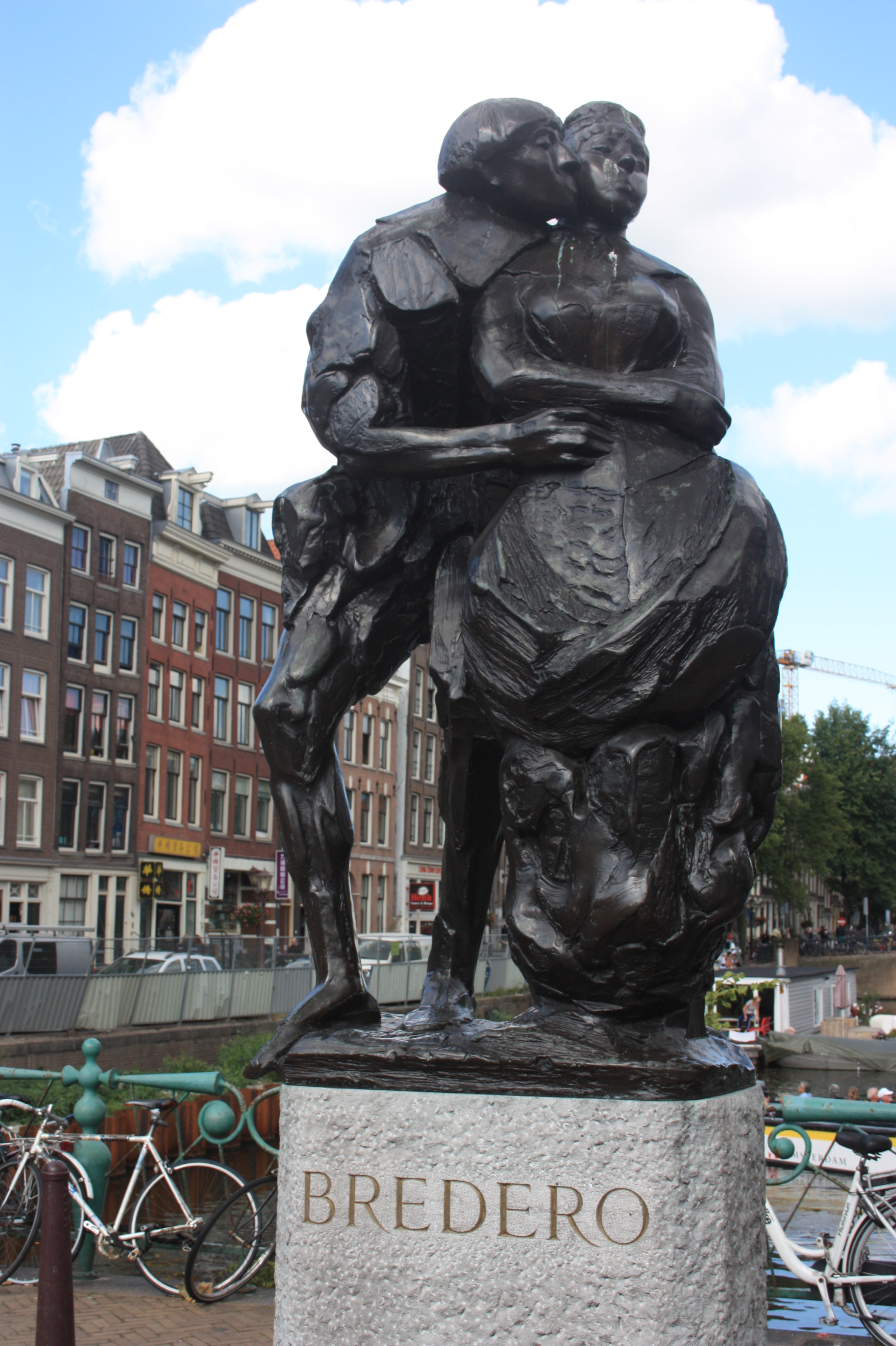
Memorial to Bredero, Amsterdam

Gerbrand Adriaenszoon Bredero (16 March 1585 – 23 August 1618) was a Dutch poet and playwright in the period known as the Dutch Golden Age.

== Life ==
Gerbrand Adriaenszoon Bredero was born on 16 March 1585 in Amsterdam in the Dutch Republic, where he lived his whole life. He called himself "G.A. Bredero, Amstelredammer", and sometimes he is called Breero or Brederode. He was the third child of Marry Gerbrants and Adriaen Cornelisz Bredero, who was a shoemaker and a successful real estate agent. Bredero was born in the Nes, nowadays number 41, and in 1602 he and his family moved to a house on Oudezijds Voorburgwal, now number 244, which his father had bought. Bredero lived in this house for the rest of his life. Both houses are now restaurants in Amsterdam's famous red light district.

At school Bredero learned French and possibly also some English and Latin. Later he was educated as an artist by the Antwerp painter Francesco Badens, but none of his paintings have survived. In 1611 he became a member of the rederijkerskamer d'Eglantier, where he was an active member and became friends with Roemer Visscher and P.C.Hooft. Together with Hooft he joined Costers Nederduytsche Academie. Around this time he wrote the play "De Spaanschen Brabander Jerolimo".

The only public position Bredero achieved was as vaandrig or standard bearer of the civic guard. On 23 August 1618, at the age of 33, Bredero suddenly died, shortly after he had recovered from pneumonia that he had contracted after falling through ice. He never married.

== Plays ==
- Rodd'rick ende Alphonsus (first performed in 1611)
- Griane (first performed in 1612)
- Klucht van de Koe
- Klucht van de Molenaer
- Moortje (first performed in 1615)
- Lucelle (first performed c. 1616)
- Spaanschen Brabander (Spanish Brabanter; first performed in 1617)
