= Pieter Corneliszoon Hooft =

Dutch historian and writer (1581–1647)

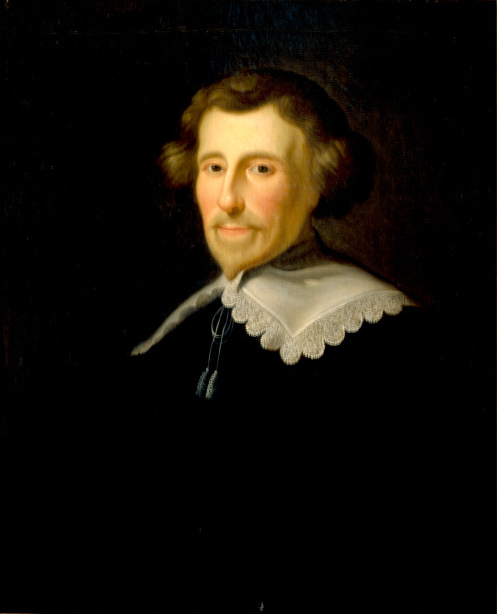
P.C. Hooft

Pieter Corneliszoon Hooft (Dutch pronunciation: [ˈpitər kɔrˈneːlɪsoːn ˈɦoːft]; 16 March 1581 – 21 May 1647) - Knight in the Order of Saint Michael - was a Dutch historian, poet and playwright who lived during the Dutch Golden Age in literature.

== Life ==
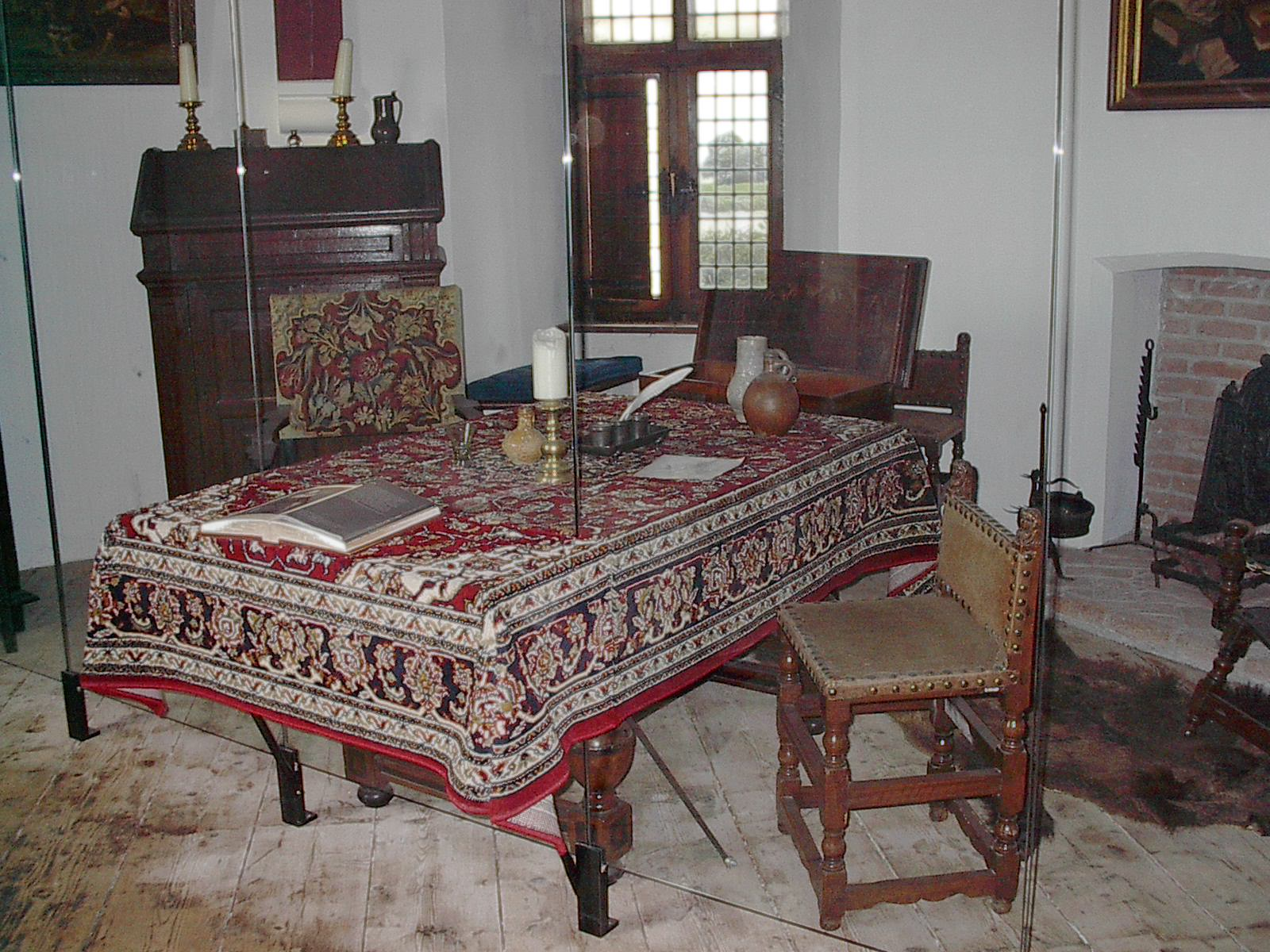
Working table of Pieter Corneliszoon Hooft

Pieter Corneliszoon Hooft, often abbreviated to P.C. Hooft (pronounced [ˈpeː ˈseː ˈɦoːft]), was born in Amsterdam as scion of the patrician Hooft family and son of burgemeester (mayor) Cornelis Hooft. He was also uncle to statesmen and burgomasters Cornelis and Andries de Graeff.

In 1598, in preparation for his career as a merchant, his father sent him to France and Italy, but Pieter Corneliszoon Hooft was more interested in art and was deeply impressed by the Italian Renaissance.

In 1609, he was appointed bailiff of Muiden and the Gooiland. He founded the Muiderkring, a literary society located at his home, the Muiderslot, the castle of Muiden, in which he got to live due to his appointment as sheriff of Muiden. Among the members were the poets and playwrights Constantijn Huygens, Maria Tesselschade, G.A. Bredero and Joost van den Vondel, as well as the Portuguese singer Francisca Duarte. Hooft, Bredero, and Vondel were also founders of the First Nederduytsche Academy.

== Work ==
Hooft was a prolific writer of plays, poems and letters, but from 1618 onwards he concentrated on writing a history of the Netherlands (Nederduytsche Historiën), inspired by Roman historian Tacitus. His focus was primarily on the Eighty Years' War between the Netherlands and Spain and though he tried to be as impartial as possible, he did succeed.

As a poet, he was influenced by his Renaissance contemporaries in France and Italy.

=== Plays ===
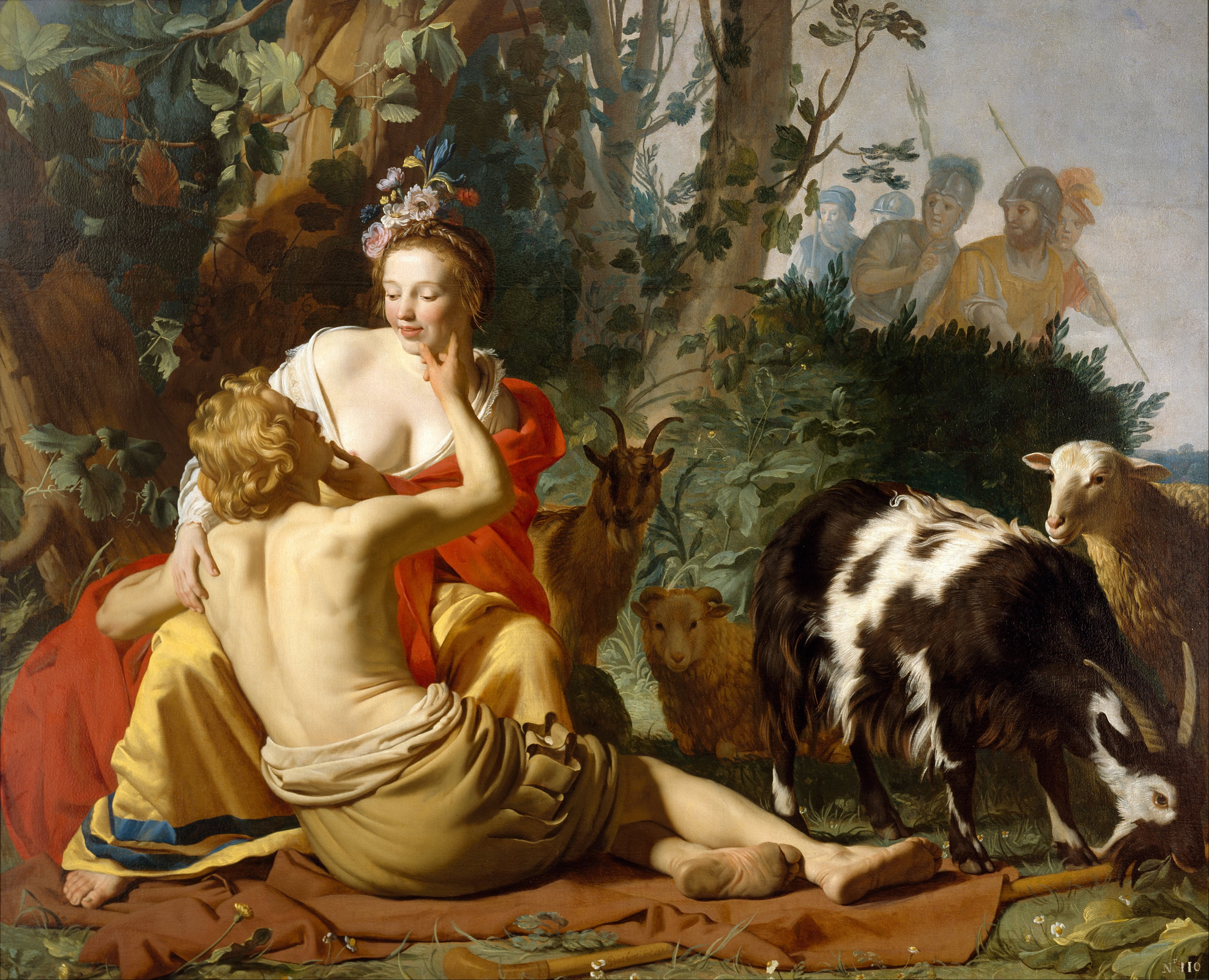
Granida (and Daifilo) by Gerard van Honthorst

- Geeraerdt van Velsen ( 1613)
- Achilles en Polyxena (1614)
- Theseus en Ariane (1614)
- Granida (1615)
- Warenar (1616)
- Baeto, oft oorsprong der Holanderen (1626)

=== Poems ===
- Emblemata amatoria: afbeeldingen van minne (1611)

=== History ===
- Nederduytsche Historiën (1642-1656)

== Present-day legacy ==
In present-day Amsterdam, Pieter Corneliszoon Hooft gives his name to P.C. Hooftstraat, the city's main destination for expensive designer clothes shopping. The south-western end of P. C. Hooftstraat runs into the city's main park, the Vondelpark, named for his friend Joost van den Vondel (see Life above). In many other Dutch cities, there are other streets named after Hooft, many of them also called P. C. Hooftstraat or Pieter C. Hooftstraat.

In 1947, 300 years after P.C. Hooft died in The Hague, a literary prize in his name was instituted by the Dutch government. An independent foundation annually awards the prize. Initially it was awarded for specific works, but in recent years it is awarded based on the entire collection of a writer.

== Gallery ==
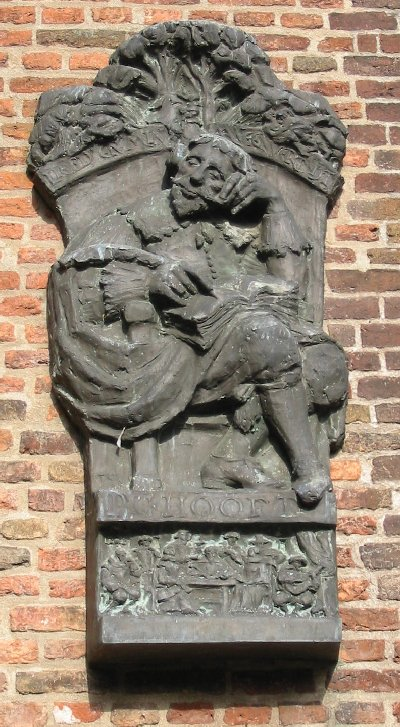
Sculpture of P.C. Hooft in the castle Muiderslot

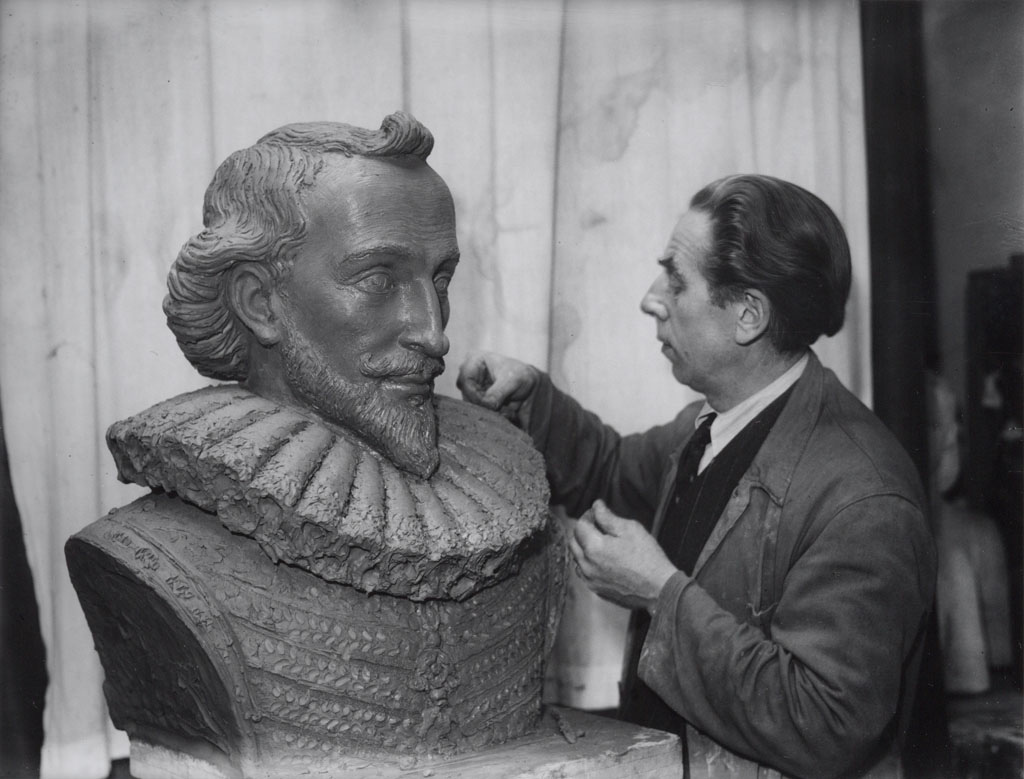
Sculptor Frits Sieger with bust of P.C. Hooft. Amsterdam; 22 March 1947

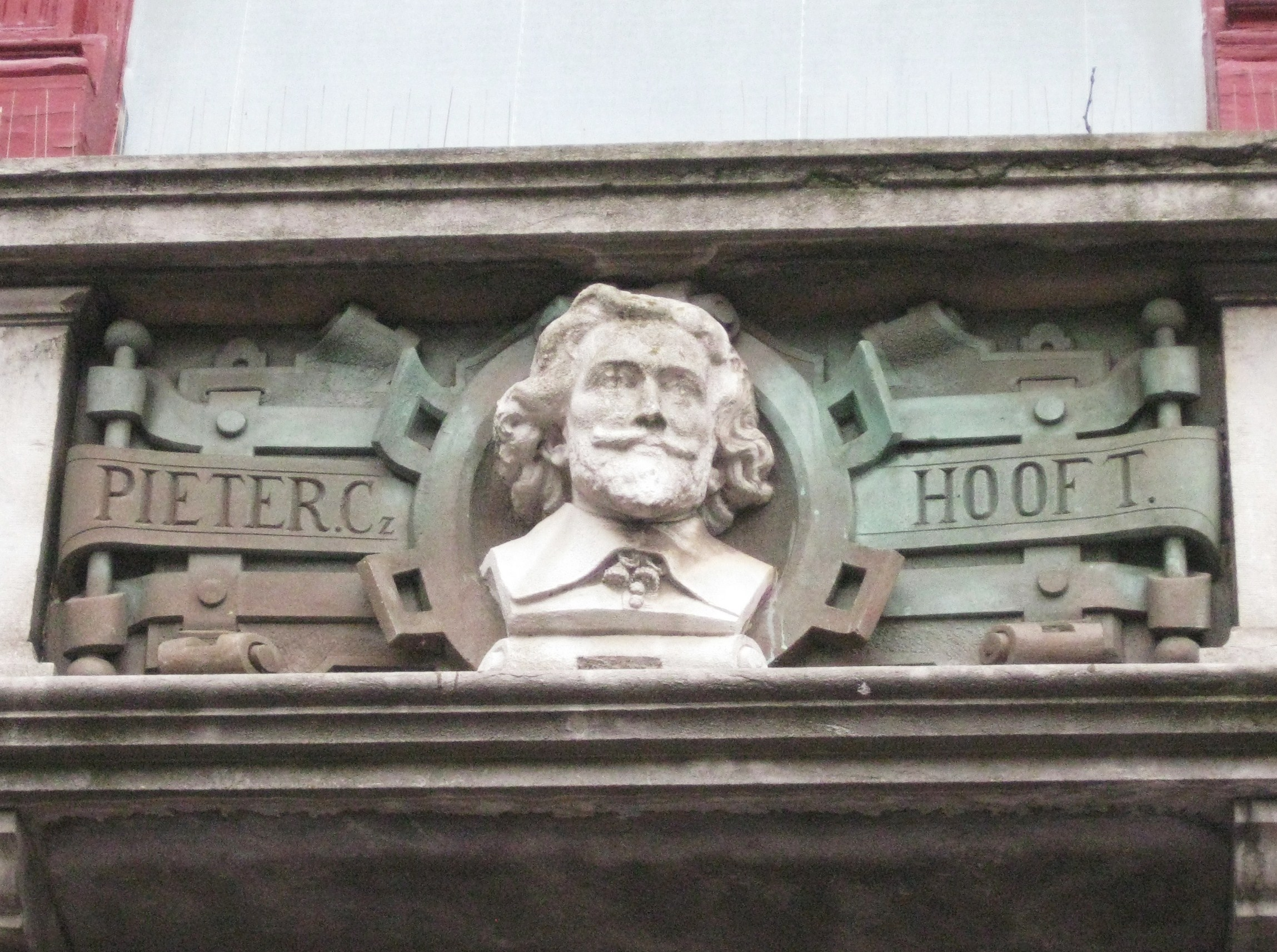
Gable stone of P.C. Hooft above his former house.Eduard Colinet, 1881
