= List of chambers of rhetoric =

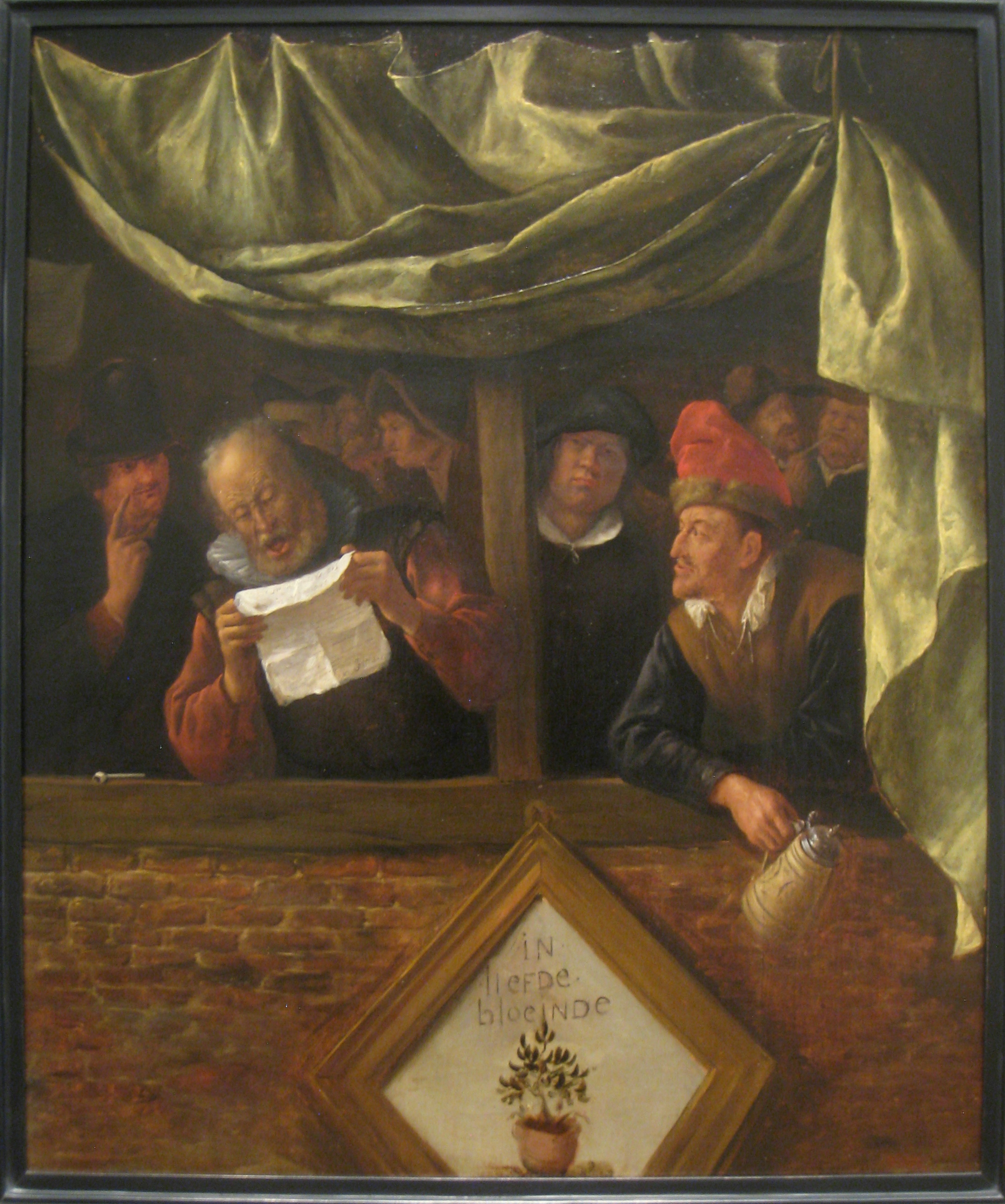
The Rhetoricians, circa 1655, by Jan Steen. The painting depicts a rederijker reading his poem, while hanging over the balcony the blason of his chamber of rhetoric can be seen; in this case the Amsterdam society "Egelantier", whose symbol was a wild rose (egelantier) and whose motto was "In Liefde Bloeiend".

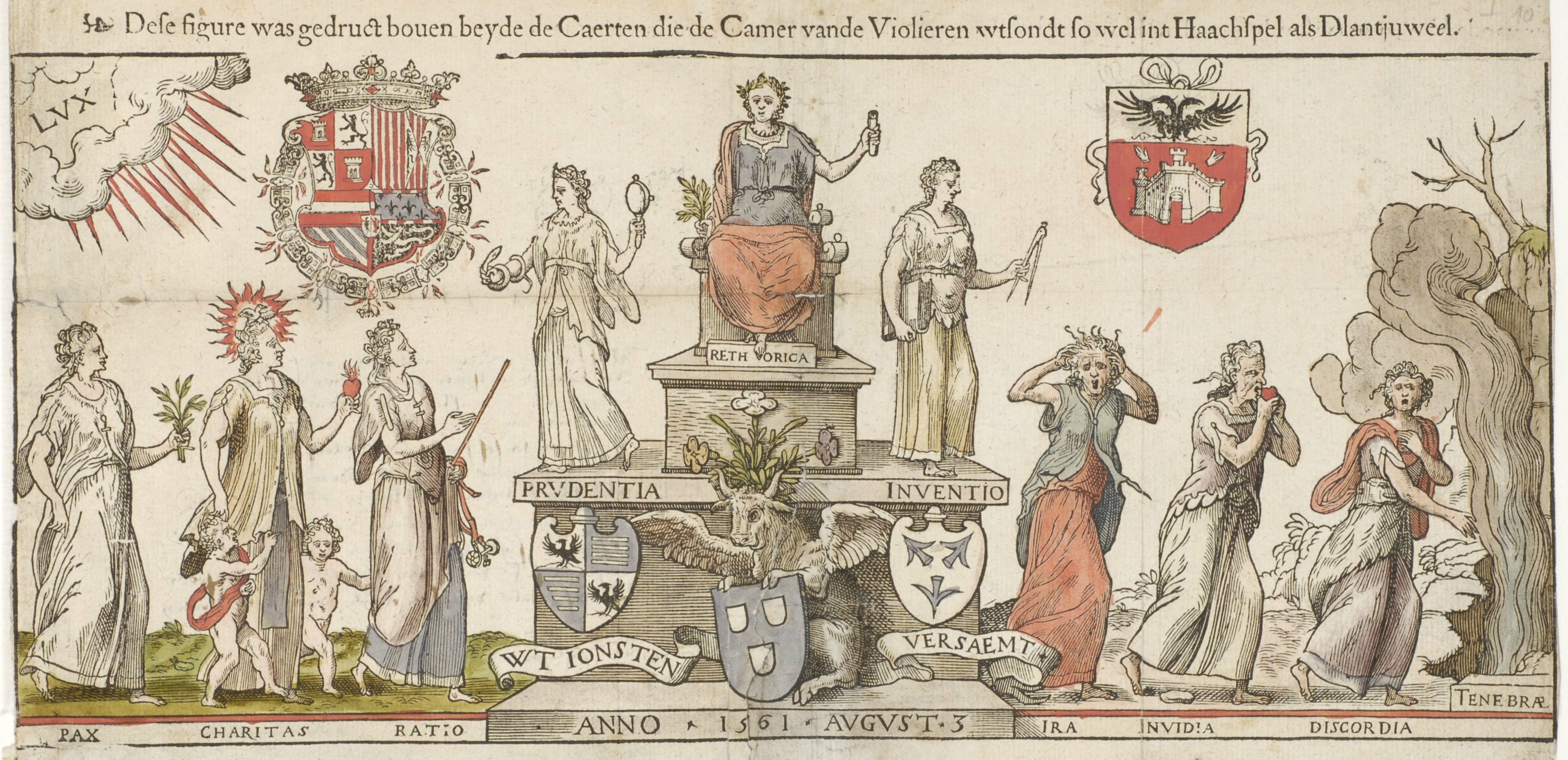
Printed invitation to other chambers of rhetoric by the Antwerp Violieren, for a landjuweel event, lasting 19 days, in 1561

A chamber of rhetoric was a civic society for the promotion of poetry, drama and eloquence. They also maintained literary contact between different towns, partly through competitions in which chambers from other places were invited to compete, producing a shared literary culture across different jurisdictions. Growing from medieval confraternities that performed mystery plays and miracle plays for feast days and civic festivals, they were widespread in the Low Countries during the Renaissance period, with some survivals and revivals in subsequent periods down to the present day. They were often named after flowers or patron saints.

The following list, arranged by the town, city, liberty or lordship in which a chamber was active, is incomplete.

== Aalst ==
- Barbaristen
- Catharinisten

== Aarschot ==
- Tervenbloesel

== Amsterdam ==
- Egelantier
- Wit Lavendel

== Antwerp ==
- Goudbloem
- Olyftack
- Violieren

== Arendonk ==
- Heilig Groetsel

== Asse ==
- Barbaristen

== Bergen op Zoom ==
- Jonge Vreugdebloem

== Breda ==
- Jonge Distelbloem
- Vreugdendal

== Bruges ==
- Drie Santinnen
- Heilige Geest

== Brussels ==
- Den Boeck
- Corenbloem
- Lelie
- Mariacransken
- Violette

== Damme ==
- Annunciatie

== Diest ==
- Christusogen
- Lelie

== Dunkirk ==
- Sint-Michiel

== Enghien ==
- Sint-Anna

== Geel ==
- Bremblomme

== Ghent ==
- Balsemblomme
- Fonteine
- Sint-Agnete
- Sint-Barbara

== Goes ==
- Nardusbloem

== Gouda ==
- Goudbloem

== Haarlem ==
- Trou moet Blycken
- Witte Angieren
- Wyngaertranken

== Hasselt ==
- Roose
- de Roode Roos
- Sint-Anna

== Helmond ==
- Vlasbloem

== 's-Hertogenbosch ==
- Barbaristen
- Catharinisten
- Jonge Lauwerieren
- Moyses bosch
- Passiebloem
- Sint-Agatha

== Hoboken ==
- Leliken van Calvarien

== Leiden ==
- Oranjelelie

== Leffinge ==
- Altoos Doende

== Lier ==
- Jenettebloem

== Leuven ==
- Lelie
- Peterseliepoot
- Roose

== Maastricht ==
- Jonge Goudbloem

== Mechelen ==
- Lisbloem
- Peoene

== Mol ==
- Lindebloem

== Mons ==
- réthoriciens de Notre-Dame

== Nieuwpoort ==
- Doornenkroon

== Ninove ==
- Witte Waterroose

== Oudenaarde ==
- Jonge Retorike
- Pax vobis
- Het kersouwken (Pamele)

== Tienen ==
- Fonteine

== Tongeren ==
- Witte Lelie

== Tournai ==
- Puy d'amours

== Turnhout ==
- Heybloemken

== Valenciennes ==
- Notre Dame du Puy

== Vilvoorde ==
- Goudbloem

== Ypres ==
- Achtervroets
- Getrouw van herten
- Lichtgeladen
- Morianen
- Roziers
- Vreugdenaars

== Zoutleeuw ==
- Lelikens uten Dale

== Sources ==
- Prudens van Duyse, De rederijkkamers in Nederland, 2 vols. (Ghent, 1900–1902)
- A. A. Keersmaekers, Geschiedenis van de Antwerpse Rederijkerskamers in de jaren 1585–1635 (Aalst, 1952)
- Jan Thieullier, ed., De schadt-kiste der philosophen ende poeten waer inne te vinden syn veel schoone leerlycke blasoenen, refereynen ende liedekens gebracht ende gesonden op de Peoen-camere binnen Mechelen (Mechelen, Henry Jaye, 1621)
- Anne-Laure Van Bruaene, Het Repertorium van rederijkerskamers in de Zuidelijke Nederlanden en Luik 1400-1650 (online publication, 2004)
