= Faydherbe =

Faydherbe or Fayd'herbe is a surname. Notable people with the surname include:

- Antoon Faydherbe (died 1653), Flemish sculptor
- Hendrik Faydherbe (1574–1629), Flemish sculptor and gilder, and poet
- Lucas Faydherbe (1617–1697), Flemish sculptor and architect
- Maria Faydherbe (1587–1643), Flemish sculptor
