= Hendrik Faydherbe =

Flemish sculptor, gilder and poet

- Born: 1574; Mechelen
- Died: 30 April 1629 (aged 54–55)
- Education: apprentice to Melchior d'Assonville
- Known for: alabaster sculpture
- Movement: Baroque
- Spouse: Cornelia Franchoys

Hendrik Faydherbe or Henri Fayd'herbe (1574–1629) was a Flemish sculptor and gilder, and poet, who lived and worked in Mechelen, in the Southern Netherlands.

== Life ==
Faydherbe was born in Mechelen in 1574, the son of Antoon Faydherbe, a brewer, and at the age of fifteen was apprenticed to Melchior d'Assonville in Mechelen's Guild of Saint Luke. He was awarded the freedom of the craft on 17 July 1599 and until 1604 ran his own workshop in Mechelen. Then hard times forced him to seek employment in Antwerp. By 1620 he was back in Mechelen, where he was "factor" of the chamber of rhetoric (poetry and drama guild) the Peoene. Two of his poems, signed with the pen name Selden rust (Seldom rest) were included in De Schadt-kiste der philosophen ende poeten (Mechelen, Henry Jaye, 1621), a volume recording the performances at a poetry and performance competition hosted by the Peoene in 1620. He died on 30 April 1629.

His son, Lucas Faydherbe, was an influential baroque sculptor and architect, and his brother Antoon Faydherbe and sister Maria Faydherbe were also sculptors.
