= Jan Thieullier =

Flemish poet

- Citizenship: Mechelen
- Spouse: Maayke Schitterincks
- Children: Wilhelmus Thieullier
- Writing career
- Pen name: Troost U in Godt
- Language: Dutch
- Years active: 1617–1621
- Period: Baroque
- Genres: drama, verse
- Subject: pastoral tragedy
- Notable work: Porphyre en Cyprine (1621)
- Literary movement: chamber of rhetoric

Jan Thieullier (active in the early 17th century) was a Flemish poet, residing in Mechelen, about whom very little is known.

== Life ==
Thieullier was a silversmith who has been said to have been born in Mechelen, but the evidence for this is unclear. In January 1617 he was dean of the Mechelen chamber of rhetoric the Peoene (the Peony). On 24 May 1619 his son, Wilhelmus, was baptized in St. Rumbold's Cathedral. As dean of the Peoene Thieullier was one of the organisers of the blazoenfeest (a rhetoric competition) hosted in Mechelen on 3 May 1620. Participants in the competition came from as far afield as Gouda and Haarlem.

As part of the event, a play was performed which Thieullier had written for the occasion: Porphyre en Cyprine. This was the first pastoral tragedy in the Netherlandish tradition of "rhetorical" drama. It was printed in 1621.

== Works ==
Porphyre en Cyprine treur-spel verthoont by de redenrijcke gulde die Peoen binnen Mechelen (Mechelen, Henry Jaye, 1621). Available on Google Books.

Thieullier also wrote commendatory verses for Richard Verstegan's Neder-Duytsche Epigrammen (Mechelen, Henry Jaye, 1617) and for Willem van Nieuwelandt's Claudius Domitius Nero (1618) and Poema vanden mensch (1621).
