= Henry Jaye =

English Catholic exile and printer in the Low Countries

- Died: 1643
- Other names: Henry Gay, Hendrick Jaey
- Occupation: printer
- Years active: 1617–1639
- Era: handpress
- Employer: City of Mechelen
- Notable work: The Primer, or Office of the Blessed Virgin Marie (1615); De Schadt-kiste der philosophen ende poeten (1621)
- Criminal charge: Slandering James I of England
- Spouse: Catharina vande Zetten

Henry Jaye (died 1643) was an English Catholic exile in the Southern Netherlands. He became printer to the city of Mechelen.

== Life ==
The earliest record of Jaye is in 1606, when the English ambassador in Brussels, Sir Thomas Edmondes, had him summoned before Jean Richardot in an attempt to have him punished by the authorities in the Low Countries for slandering James I of England. He had allegedly spoken "certain very lewd and infamous words against his Majesty", namely:

A pockes of god of the kinge of Ingland yf you terme him kinge I hope to see him hanged, he is none of my prince nether doe I knowledge him to be my prince. Nether a trewe anoyntted Prince nor never was or shalbe.

In 1607 Jaye opened an account with the Plantin Office as a bookseller in Brussels. By 1609 he was married to Catharina vande Zetten, a daughter (or perhaps step-daughter) of Pieter Simons, and by November 1610 they were living in Mechelen, where their daughter was baptized in St Rumbold's Cathedral.

His first known publication is The Lyf of the Mother Teresa of Jesus (1611) – the first English translation of the autobiography of Teresa of Avila, by Michael Walpole. This was printed for him in Antwerp, but by 1612 he was operating his own press in Mechelen. In 1613 he printed the codification of the customary law of the city and lordship of Mechelen – Costumen, usancien ende styl van procederen der stadt, vryheyt ende jurisdictie van Mechelen, which he reprinted in 1633.

In 1619 he printed the statutes and procedures of the Great Council of Mechelen, the highest court of appeal in the Spanish Netherlands, Ordonnances, statuts, stil, et manière de procéder faictes, & décretées par le roy nostre sire, pour le grand conseil, and in the 1630s a number of sentences and decisions of the same court.

In 1620 a performance poetry competition was held in Mechelen between a number of chambers of rhetoric (civic drama guilds). Jaye printed the competing poems and rebuses under the title De Schadt-kiste der Philosophen ende Poeten.

It is not clear when he was appointed printer to the city, but he was using that title on his imprints from the later 1630s. He died in 1643.

== Device ==
One of his printing devices was a tower on a rocky island, with the motto Turris fortitudinis nomen domini (The name of the lord is a tower of strength).

== Publications ==
- 1611: The Lyf of the Mother Teresa of Jesus (printed in Antwerp for Henry Jaye) – the autobiography of Teresa of Avila
- 1613: John Alberto Buronzo (in fact Nicolo Berzetti), The practice of meditating with profit
- ----: Costumen, usancien ende styl van procederen der stadt, vryheyt ende iurisdictie van Mechelen – a re-edition of the 1535 codification of the customary law of the city and liberty of Mechelen, available on Google Books
- 1614: By de Eertzhertogen: Onser rentmester van onse domeynen des landts van Mechelen
- ----: Thomas Wright, Quatuor Colloquia – available on Google Books
- 1615: The Primer, or office of the Blessed Virgin Marie – a translation of the Tridentine Primer
- 1616: Manuductions to the pallace of truth
- ----: Thomas a Kempis, The following of Christ, translated by Anthony Hoskins
- 1617: Regnerus Bruitsma, Iatricum votum in publicae salutis
- ----: Plausus in sacerdotale Iubilaeum illustrissimi ac reverendissimi Dni. D. Matthiae Hovii Archiepiscopi Mechliniensis: acclamati a iuventute Collegii Mechliniensis Societatis Iesu – a celebration of the 50-year jubilee of the priestly ordination of Mathias Hovius, held at the Jesuit college in Mechelen
- ----: R. V. (Richard Rowlands), Neder-duytsche epigrammen op verscheyden saecken – a volume of epigrams, available on Google Books
- 1618: Rules of the English sodalitie of the Immaculate Conception of the most glorious Virgin Mary Mother of God
- ----: Theodoricus. Tragedie a representer par la jeunesse du College de la Société de Jesus à Malines le xi de Septembre l'an 1618
- ----: Peter of Alcantara, Instructie om wel te mediteren, translated by Jan Snellinck
- ----: Juan Castaniza, Den Gheestelycken Strydt, Met reden ghenoemteen Gulden Tractaetken vande volmaecktheyt
- 1619: An abstracte of the life and martirdome of Mistres Margaret Clitherowe – a life of Margaret Clitherow
- ----: Ordonnances, statuts, stil, et manière de procéder faictes, & décretées par le roy nostre sire, pour le grand conseil de Sa Maiesté, le 8 jour d'aougst 1559 – the statutes and procedures of the Great Council of Mechelen
- 1620: Copye vuyt den Mandemente, aen-gaende den Statuten onlanckx gemaekt
- ----: Andrew Cryghton, A treatise of Antichrist
- ----: William Paterson, The Protestants theologie
- ----: (Thomas Worthington), The second part of an Anker of Christian Doctrine
- ----: J. de Bonilla, Een cort tractaet, daer inne verclaert wort hoe nootsaeckelijcken dat de vrede der zielen is – available on Google Books
- 1621: Apologia ofte Bescherm-redenen teghen het kekelen van de onredelijcke vyanden, ende oock de tegenraeders, van de Berghen van Bermherticheyt – a verse justification for the low-interest loan banks founded by Wenceslas Cobergher in Brussels and elsewhere, available on Google Books
- ----: Antonio de Molina, Spiritual exercises (reprinted 1623)
- ----: De Schadt-kiste der philosophen ende poeten – available on Google Books
- ----: R. V. (Richard Rowlands), De spiegel der Nederlandsche elenden – available on Google Books
- ----: Jan Thieullier, Porphyre en Cyprine treur-spel verthoont by de redenrijcke gulde die Peoen – a tragedy staged by the chamber of rhetoric Peoene in Mechelen on 3 May 1620, available on Google Books
- 1622: Jean Martini, Het leven van den H. P. Franciscus Xaverius, apostel van Indien, ende Japonien, priester der Societeydt Iesu – a life of St Francis Xavier
- 1623: Antonio Fonseca, De epidemia febrili grassante in exercitu regis catholici in inferiori palatinatu, anno 1620 et 21 – an account of the epidemic that decimated the Army of Flanders in the Palatinate campaign of 1620–1621, available on Google Books
- ----: The application of the lawes of England for Catholike priesthood, and the Sacrifice of the Masse
- ----: A Toung-combat, lately happening, between two English soldiers
- 1624: Het heijligh Leven ende seer wonderlycke wercken van den heylighen Vader Petrus van Alcantara
- 1625: Statuta omnium curiarum ecclesiasticarum provinciae Mechliniensis – available on Google Books
- ----: Adrianus Huberti, Manuale pro directionequarumdam Confraternitatum
- 1628: Literae aethiopicae scriptae ab ipsomet patriarcha aethiopiae R.P. Alphonso Mendez, societatis Iesu Doctore Theologe, & in Academia Eborensi quondam professore kalendis Iunij 1626
- ----: Jaerlijcken brief van Japonien van het jaer 1624 – a Dutch translation of the Jesuit annual letter from Japan for 1624, available on Google Books
- 1633: Regnerus Bruitsma, Nova-antiqua schola salerna
- ----: Godefridus Vereycken, Tractatus de cognitione et conservatione sui
- 1634: Copie de la sentence donnée contre le comte Henry de Bergh à Malines le 13 de mars 1634 – the sentence pronounced upon Hendrik van den Bergh for his part in the Conspiracy of Nobles
- 1635: Robert Bellarmine, An ample Declaration of the Christian Doctrine, translated by R. H.
- ----: Copie des Arrests rendus au grand Conseil de sa Majesté le 2. de May 1635, contre le Prince d'Espinoy, & Charles de Pienne, available on Google Books
- 1636: Copie de l'arrest contre le Conte de Hennin
- 1638: Joannes Wachtendonck, Vita, passio, et miracula S. Rumoldi archiepiscopi Dublinensis, Apostoli Mechliniensis & martyris
- 1639: Joannes Wachtendonck, Het leven 't lyden ende mirakelen vanden H. Rombout, a Dutch translation of the previous by Franchoys vanden Bossche
- ----: Gloriosus B. Matris Theresæ de Subacto Mundo Triumphus
- ----: Arrest du Grand Conseil du roy, rendu contre le comte d'Egmont. Le xv. Juillet 1639
- ----: Joannes Antonius a Gurnez, Vita et martyrium S. Liberti Malinatis – a life of Libert of Saint-Trond, available on Google Books
