= Violieren =

Coordinates: 51.2203°N 4.4059°E

The Gillyflower
- De Violieren
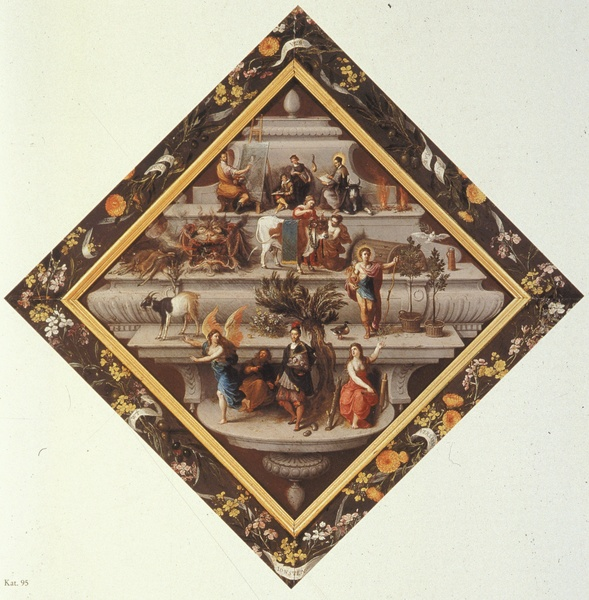
- Poem as rebus on a shield, 1681, Royal Museum of Fine Arts of Antwerp. Painted for the Violieren by the painters Hendrick van Balen, Jan Brueghel the Elder, Frans Francken II, and Sebastian Vrancx
- Merged into: Olyftack (1660)
- Formation: around 1480
- Dissolved: 1762
- Type: Chamber of rhetoric
- Official language: Dutch
- Honorary president: Hooftman
- Chairman: Prince
- Executive officer: Deken
- Executive assistants: Oudermans
- Key people: Accoustrementmeester (properties master); Breuckmeesters (responsible for collecting membership fees); Busmeester (responsible for collecting alms for sick or "decayed" members); Princen van personagiën (casting directors)
- Staff: personagiën, confreers
- Volunteers: liefhebbers

The Violieren (wallflower or gillyflower) was a chamber of rhetoric that dates back to the 15th century in Antwerp, when it was a social drama society with close links to the Guild of Saint Luke. It was one of three drama guilds in the city, the other two being the Goudbloem and the Olyftack. In 1660 the Violieren merged with former rival Olyftack, and in 1762 the society was dissolved altogether.

== History ==
Much of what is known today about Antwerp's chambers of rhetoric comes from the city and guild archives. According to a note by the year 1480 in the early records of the Guild of St. Luke, the chamber's first victory was at a "Landjuweel" (a rhetoric competition open to contenders from throughout the Duchy of Brabant) in Leuven that took place that year. Their motto was "Wt ionsten versaemt"(united in friendship). From 1490, the chamber received an annual grant from the town of Antwerp. In 1493 they participated in a major contest in Mechelen and in 1496 they hosted their own "Landjuweel" in Antwerp.

The society was popular throughout the 16th century and many noted artists were members. The French Wikipedia includes a list of the deans.

== The 1561 Landjuweel ==
In 1561 a large competition of 13 chambers of rhetoric in the Duchy of Brabant was organised by De Violieren in Antwerp. The competition called 'landjuweel' in Dutch ('jewel of the land') was held at 7-year intervals between 1515 and 1541. But because of the public turmoil in the Low Countries there was an interruption of 20 years before De Violieren, which had won the last landjuweel, organised another edition of the competition. A landjuweel involved performances of drama, processions, tableaux vivants and recitations of poetry. An estimated 5,000 participants from twelve cities traveled to Antwerp for the 1561 event.

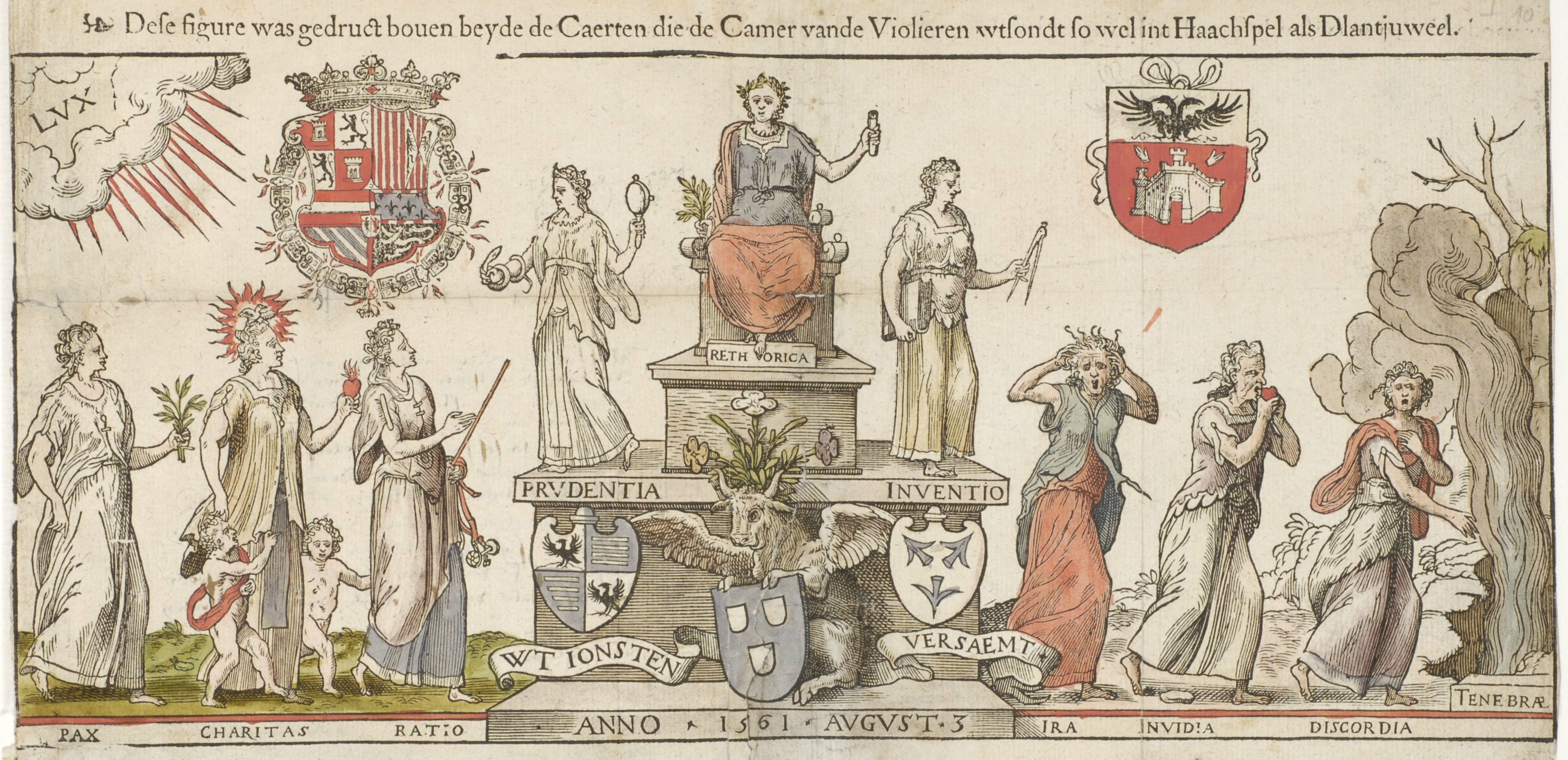
Printed invitation to other chambers of rhetoric by the Antwerp Violieren, for the 1561 Landjuweel

Willen van Haecht who was at the time the factor (poet in title) of De Violieren wrote the invitations and introductory material for the 1561 landjuweel. This material was intended as a sort of mission statement for the event and gave it a political, literary and economic framing. In the 1561 competition the participating chambers were required to provide a solution for the issues of peace, knowledge and community in every part of the competition. The invitation and moralities of the competition, as well as other poetic works, were published in 1562 under the title Spelen van sinne, vol scoone moralisacien, vvtleggingen ende bediedenissen op alle loeflijcke consten with a preface by van Haecht. The Caerte or invitation letter for the landjuweel was written by van Haecht in the form of a poem of 13 stanzas of 11 lines (rhyme scheme AABAABBCBBC) and starting and ending with the motto of De Violieren which was Vvt ionsten versaemt (gathered in a spirit of goodwill).

The prologue to the actual plays written by van Haecht describes how Rhetorica has been sleeping in the protective lap of Antwerp where it was discovered by three nymphs. The first two plays performed prior to the actual start of the landjuweel were by the hand of van Haecht. The first play called Oordeel van Tmolus tusschen Apollo en Pan, deals with the mythological theme of the judgement of Midas. Midas had ruled in favour of Pan in a musical performance competition between Apollo and Pan. As punishment Apollo had transformed Midas' ears into ass' ears. Midas tried to hide his ears from god but failed to do so. Apparently, the author wanted to produce a Renaissance work, while drawing his material from classical mythology. However, in the second part of the play, it turns into medieval sotterny (farce). Van Haecht also wrote the second preliminary play that was called the Prologue in which he extolled the virtue of unity. Van Haecht also wrote the farewell piece, Oorloff oft Adieu, and the closing piece of another theatre competition held at the same time as the landjuweel referred to as haagspel. In the farewell piece, he advances the thesis that the decadence of Rome and that of other ancient empires should not be attributed to the disbelief or rejection of God, but to the decline of the arts.

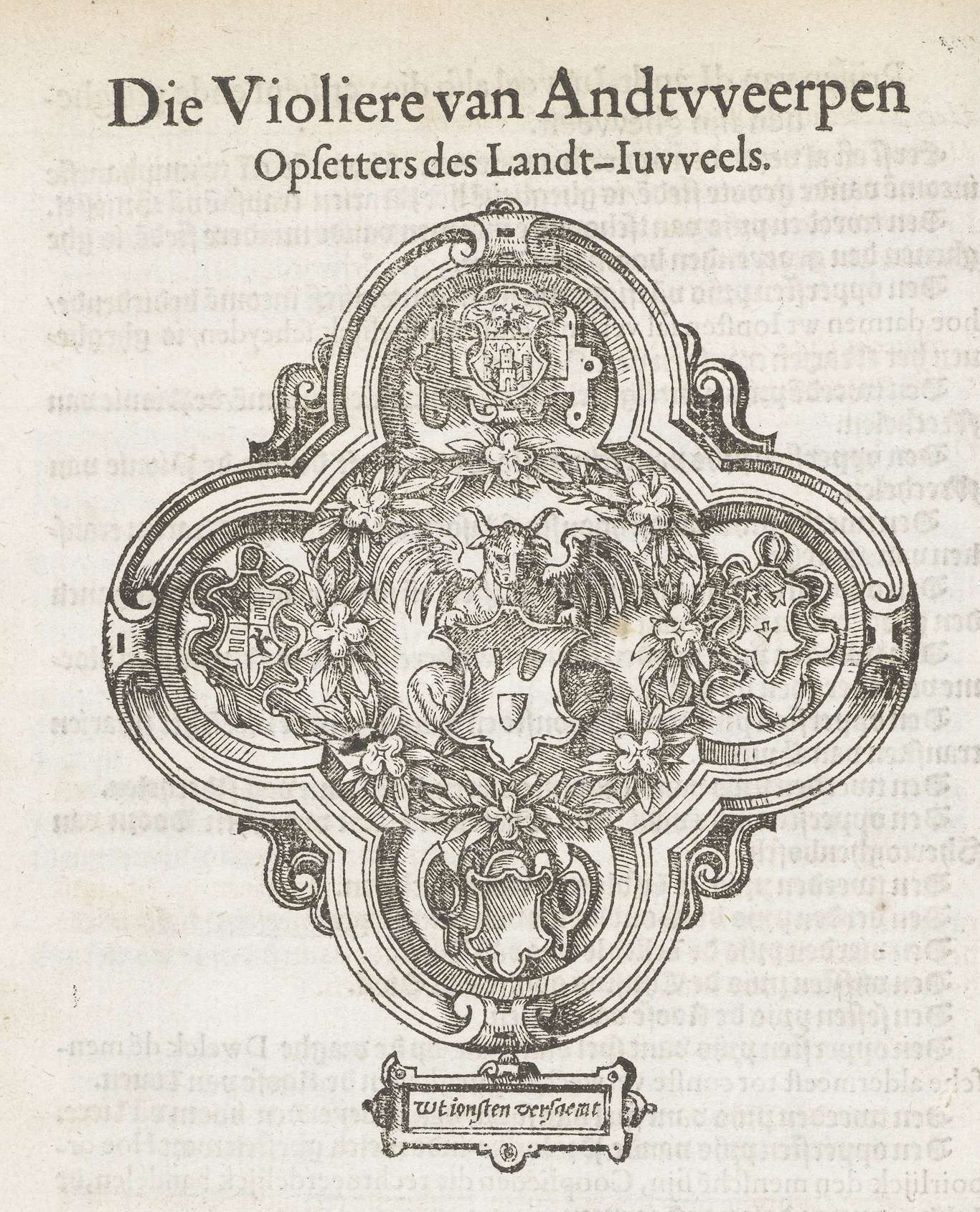
The emblem of the Violieren van Antwerpen for the Landjuweel

In the Royal Library of Belgium is kept a bundle of documents referred to as the Landjuweel van Antwerpen, 1561 (catalogue number II 13.368 E (RP)). It is made up of all kinds of loose papers of different sizes without folio, some of which are printed while others are handwritten. The date 1561 is incorrect, since a chorus dated to 1578 is included. This heterogeneous collection of papers, a number of which are related to the landjuweel of 1561, was likely bundled by Willem van Haecht. He added the following pieces written by himself: a chorus on Om datmen vianden moest voor vrienden houwen (Because one has to treat enemies as friends) (1576), a chorus on Godt slaet en geneest, den droeuen hy blijde maeckt (God hits and heal and makes the sad happy) and a chorus on De rijcke weet qualijck hoe daerme te moey is (The rich do not understand how tired the poor are). The last page of the bundle of papers has about 20 verses, probably from a chorus on Betrout in Godt, Hy en sal v niet verlaten (Trust in god and he will not leave you).

=== After 1585 ===
There were occasional major productions, usually to celebrate particular events. In 1585 the Violieren participated in the triumphal entry into Antwerp of Alexander Farnese, Duke of Parma. During the 1590s there were no regular public performances, and for much of the decade meetings were prohibited by decree, but after 1600 members and sympathisers of the guild again began to meet weekly for dramatic and rhetorical exercises. On 16 June 1610 they performed a play on the main market square to celebrate the ratification of the Twelve Years' Truce. During the Truce, a representative of the Violieren attended a rederijkersfeest (festival of rhetoric) held in Amsterdam on 7 July 1613, organised by the Amsterdam chamber Wit Lavendel (White lavender), and in 1617 the chamber hosted its own competition in Antwerp. The constitutions of the chamber, dating back to 1480, were revised in 1619.

A rhetoric competition drawing participants from across the Low Countries was hosted by the Peoene (Peony) in Mechelen on 3 May 1620. Members of the Violieren carried off first prize for best rhyming rebus, first prize for best painted rebus, second prize for strongest line, and first prize for best performance in song.

In 1624 the chamber put on a new play by Willem van Nieuwelandt, Aegyptica, and they performed again the same year when Wladislaw, Prince of Poland was festively received in the city on his way to view the siegeworks at Breda. In 1625 the city celebrated the success of the siege, with the Violieren performing at the celebrations. At the joyous reception in Antwerp of Cardinal-Infante Ferdinand of Austria, in 1635, the Violieren provided two performances of Perseus en Andromida: one on a stage in the main market place, and another just for the prince's entourage at St. Michael's Abbey, Antwerp.

== Organisation ==
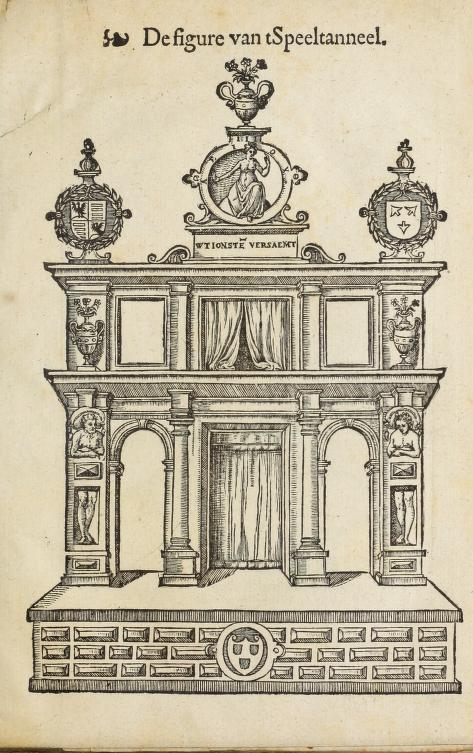
Stage of the 1561 Landjuweel

The leading officers of the chamber were the hooftman, prince, dean, and 2 oudermans ("seniors"). The hooftman (headman) was an honorary president, a non-participating patron, who audited the chamber's accounts and mediated disputes between members. He was elected for a term of three years. The prince, who chaired the actual running of the organisation, was also elected for three years. The dean, who did the actual work of administering the guild, assisted by the two seniors, was elected for a term of two years, as were the seniors.

Other officers were the casting directors (princen van personagiën), the properties master (accoustrementmeester), the breuckmeesters who collected members' fees, and the busmeesters who organised collections for sick or "decayed" members. The social functions of the chamber, like those of a guild, included attending the funerals of deceased members, providing wedding presents to members who married, and providing support for sick or impoverished members. The guild employed a facteur to carry messages, collect or deliver prizes, and convey congratulations, and a knaap to do odd jobs, notify members of funerals or of extraordinary meetings, tidy the hall, and act as doorman during performances.

By the 17th-century, the chamber enjoyed the services of semi-professional actors (personagiën) who did not pay membership fees, were provided with free food and drink at rehearsals and performances, received 6 florins for attending the funerals of guild members, and were exempt from militia duty. They worked under the direction of the princen van personagiën. The fee-paying members, or confreers, enjoyed not only freedom from militia duty but the full range of social provision that the guild provided. It was also possible to pay entrance fees, rather than membership fees, as a "sympathiser" (or liefhebber), without enjoying the full rights of guild membership.
