= Landjuweel =

Type of theatre award based on old Flemish shooting contest tradition

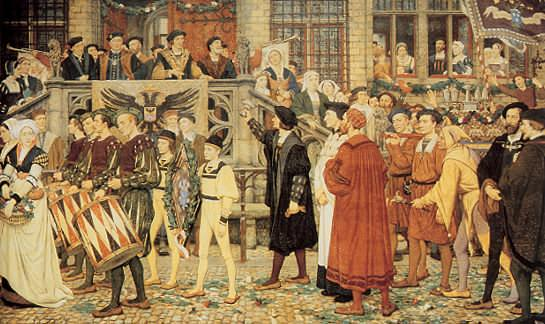
This painting, created in 1899 by Edgard Farasyn for the Salle des Pas-Perdus of the Antwerp City Hall, is an imagined representation of the procession of the Violieren chamber of rhetoric, winner of the 1539 Landjuweel grand prix in Ghent.

Landjuweel (lit. "jewel of the land") is the highest award for an amateur theatrical troupe in Belgium. It has its historical origin in the contests of the same name among the chambers of rhetoric from different cities in the Low Countries.

== History ==
=== 13th-14th century ===
The Landjuweel started out as a cycle of seven shooting matches between the Schutterij guilds in Brabant, who used the opportunity to practice the handling of arms. The upper classes of the country spectated the shootings. Occasionally sovereigns like William the Silent and Charles V also took part in the matches.

A landjuweel match was held every three years. The winner of each landjuweel had to organize the next landjuweel. The winner of the seventh landjuweel had to start a new cycle.

The winner of the first landjuweel received one silver bowl, and they would have to make two silver bowls for the match next year. The winner of the second landjuweel had to have three silver bowls made for the next game, and so on until the seventh match.

=== 15th-16th century ===
In the 15th century, literary societies known as "chambers of rhetoric" emerged in the Low Countries, and some of them retained their original constitution, at least in part, until the end of the 18th century. Their members were from the middle and upper classes. The rhetoricians cultivated the art of poetry through friendly competitive festivities sometimes held privately for the chamber and sometimes open to the public. Soon, these activities gave rise to urban festivals, celebrated in many major cities in the Low Countries. The literary contests within the festivals were transformed into local or regional rituals that lasted for days and even up to three weeks, and often with endorsement from the municipal authorities. The chambers held these competitions in taverns, theaters, or public assembly spaces.

The first recorded festival was held in Brussels in 1394. Many of the later festivals were also documented, including one in Oudenaarde in 1413; Veurne in 1419; Dunkirk in 1426; Bruges in 1427 and in 1441; Mechelen in 1427, and L'Écluse in 1431. The name landjuweel and the system of the additional silver bowls were adopted by the Brabant Chambers of rhetoric. In each festival, the winner would be selected from works in either French or Dutch, depending on the vernacular language of the host city. Some festivals accepted works in both languages during the competition. This was the case in Ghent in 1439.

==== Participants ====
Chambers from both northern and southern parts of the Low Countries participated in the festivals. For instance, the landjuweel of Antwerp in 1496 featured participants from Reimerswaal, a town in the county of Zeeland; and from Amsterdam, a town in the county of Holland. Under the feudal system, competitions for rhetoricians from Flemish municipalities continued to take place under French rule. For instance, a chamber based in Bailleul, Jong van Zinnen (Les Jeunes Cœurs), organized a landjuweel in 1769, attracting thirteen societies to participate in presenting the Tragedy of Mithridates. The thirteen chambers were from the following towns: Steenvoorde, Ypres, Alveringem, Polincove, Lo, Flêtre, Bergues, Roeselare, Hondschoote, Diksmuide, Nouvelle-Église, Strazeele and Poperinge.

==== Themes ====
A question or questions for each landjuweel were asked by the organizing chamber of rhetoric. Participating chambers were tasked with answering this question in verse. These questions were resolved by the facteurs, and usually had a moral or political purpose. The competitions were sometimes open for poems; at other times, prizes were awarded for songs. However, major competitions would often ask for complete theatrical performances as the response.

==== Organization ====
The name of the prize would change based on the host location. For competitions organized in cities, the prize would be referred to as landjuweel (lit. "the jewel of the land"), whereas competitions organized in towns or communes would have their prize called haagjuweel (lit. "the jewel of the hedge").

The landjuweel later evolved into a series of theatrical competitions organized by the chambers of rhetoric. The rhetorical guilds of the Low Countries were invited to take part. The chambers would compete against each other in demonstrations of literary skill, processions, tableaux vivants, charades, and drama and poetry competitions. The chamber that won the previous landjuweel would be the superintendent of the festival. The works were divided into two categories: esbattement (farce) and spel van sinne (morality play), and a jury made up of representatives from the chambers themselves determined the best work in each category.

==== Cycles ====
Two landjuweel cycles are known from the rhetoricians. The first ran from about 1475 to 1510, and included documented landjuweels held in the following cities:

- Leuven in 1478 and 1480;
- Mechelen in 1492, in which the then duke Philip the fair attempted to subject the chambers to ecclesiastical censorship;
- Antwerp in 1496, in which the Amsterdam chamber of Egelantier participated and won the prize of two silver bowls;
- Lier in 1500;
- Leuven in 1505;
- Reimerswaal in 1507, the first landjuweel to be held in the north. Only seven of the Zeeland chambers of rhetoric participated.
- Herentals in 1510, in which only chambers from Brabant participated.

For the second cycle, the cities that hosted each landjuweels are listed below:

- Mechelen in 1515;
- Leuven in 1518;
- Diest in 1521 and 1541;
- Brussels in 1532;
- Mechelen in 1535;
- Antwerp in 1561.

The morality plays from the last landjuweel cycle were printed in 1562. Only Brabant chambers participated in the second cycle, including chambers from the following places: Antwerp, Brussels, Mechelen, Leuven, 's-Hertogenbosch, Breda, Bergen op Zoom, Diest, Lier, Leau, Vilvoorde and Herentals. The competitions were interrupted by the wars between the Habsburg Netherlands and France. Growing suspicion by authorities towards the chambers of rhetoric and their rehtorical goals further disrupted landjuweels.

==== Counter-Reformation ====
After the Fall of Antwerp in 1585 and the Counter-Reformation that followed, landjuweel and other literary activities were limited by the government. The chambers of rhetoric and other literary societies largely disbanded or evolved during the 16th century. As outspoken writers of the Low Countries, many rhetoricians were considered dangerous by the authorities and considered to possess both bad faith and questionable morals. A poster, promulgated in 1593 under the governor Peter Ernst I von Mansfeld-Vorderort, ordered the rhetorical activities to be suspended "since their representations offend the chaste ears". In 1601, another edict required all plays to be reviewed by censors in order to prevent sacred topics from being treated lightly. Rhetorical activities and competitions were only allowed to be organized following the signing of Twelve Years' Truce. The De Peoene chamber of Mechelen organized a competition of heraldry in 1620, for which its facteur, Hendrik Faydherbe, wrote an esbattement. The nature of the chambers was notably condemned twice more in the 17th century, first by Isabella Clara Eugenia in 1631 and later by the Bishop of Ghent Antoine Triest in 1650.

=== 20th-21st century ===
The landjuweel was reinstated in 1922 by King Albert I, with the help of Herman Teirlinck, as the most prestigious award for a Flemish amateur theater company.

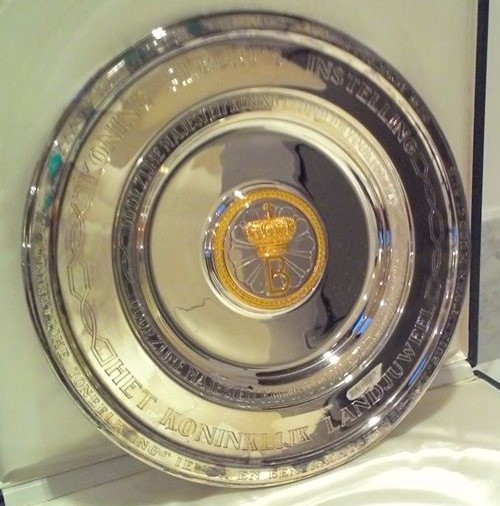
The tradition of awarding a silver bowl was reintroduced by King Boudouin in the early 1950s and given to the winner of the annual theater festival "Landjuweel" until 2012

In practice, a cash prize is offered to the winning group while the bowl is kept in the Sterckshof Silver Museum in Deurne. The bowl can also be seen on the Suikerrui in Antwerp.

The landjuweel prize was awarded for the last time in 2012. Subsequently, a new concept was developed in which high-quality productions were selected during a preliminary judging round and invited to participate in the Landjuweel Festival. Since 2016, the Landjuweel Festival takes place in a different city each year.

Cities that hosted Landjuweel Festival since 2016
Year	City	Note
2016	Mechelen	
2017	Ostend	
2018	Genk	
2019	Brussels	
2020	Sint-Niklaas	Cancelled due to the COVID-19 pandemic

== The jewel ==
The current Landjuweel is a silver bowl with a diameter of 70 cm (2 ft 4 in) and a weight of 8 kg (18 lb). Inscribed are the Coat of arms of Belgium, coats of arms for the Flemish provinces and the blazons of the following chambers of rhetoric:

- Bruges: "De Heilige Geest" (The Holy Ghost)
- Ghent: "De Fonteine van de Heilige Drievuldigheid" (The Fountain of the Holy Trinity)
- Antwerp: "De Violier" (The Gillyflower)
- Limburg: "De Oliftak" (The Olive Branch) of Sint-Truiden, "De Goudbloem" (The Gold Flower) of Borgloon, "De Witte Lelie" (The White Lily) of Tongeren, "De Rode Roos" (The Red Rose) of Hasselt, "De Korenblowm" (The Cornflower) of Bilzen
- Brussels: "Het Mariakranske" (The Mariakranske)

== Galleries ==
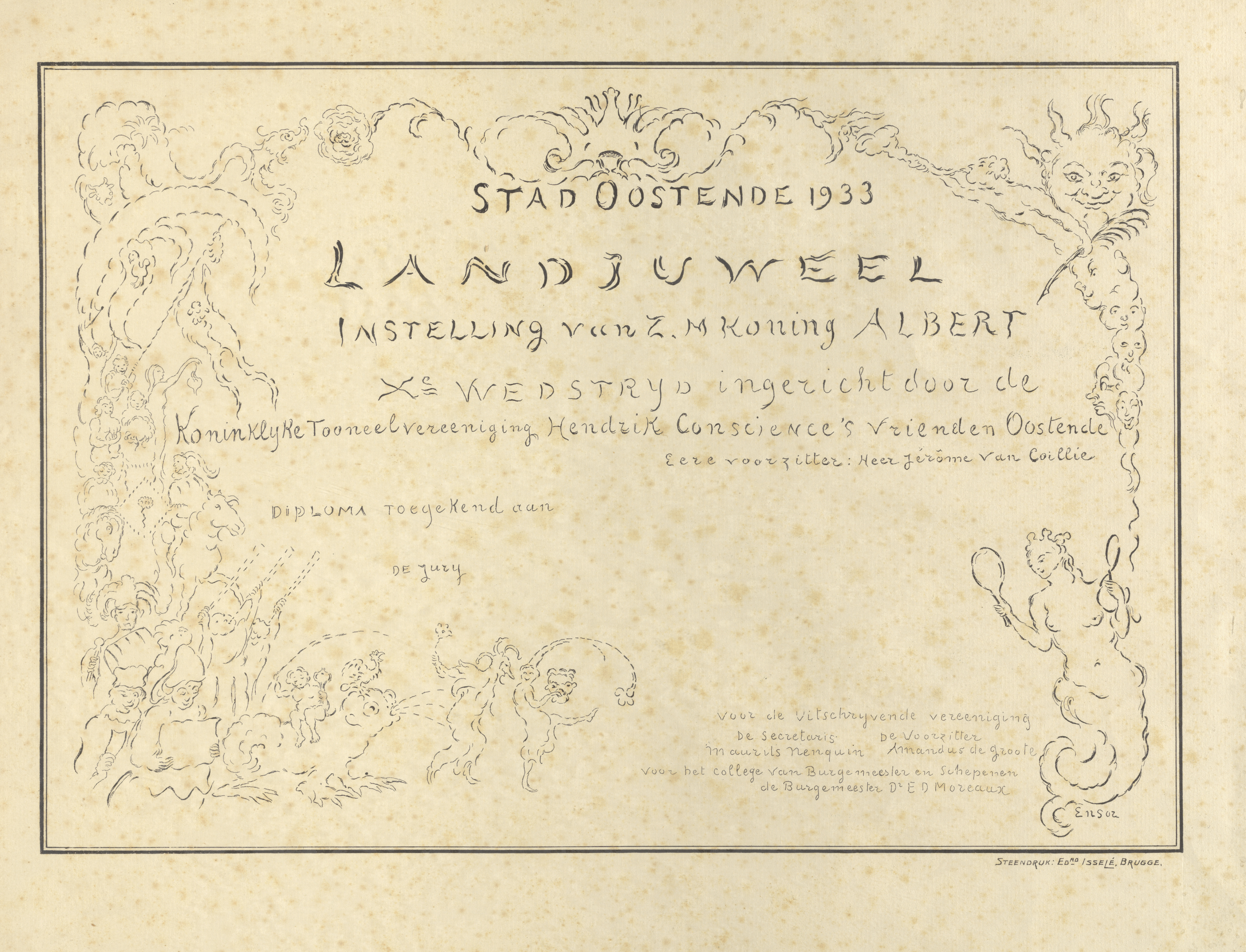
Diploma for the Xth landjuweel (1933) by James Ensor.

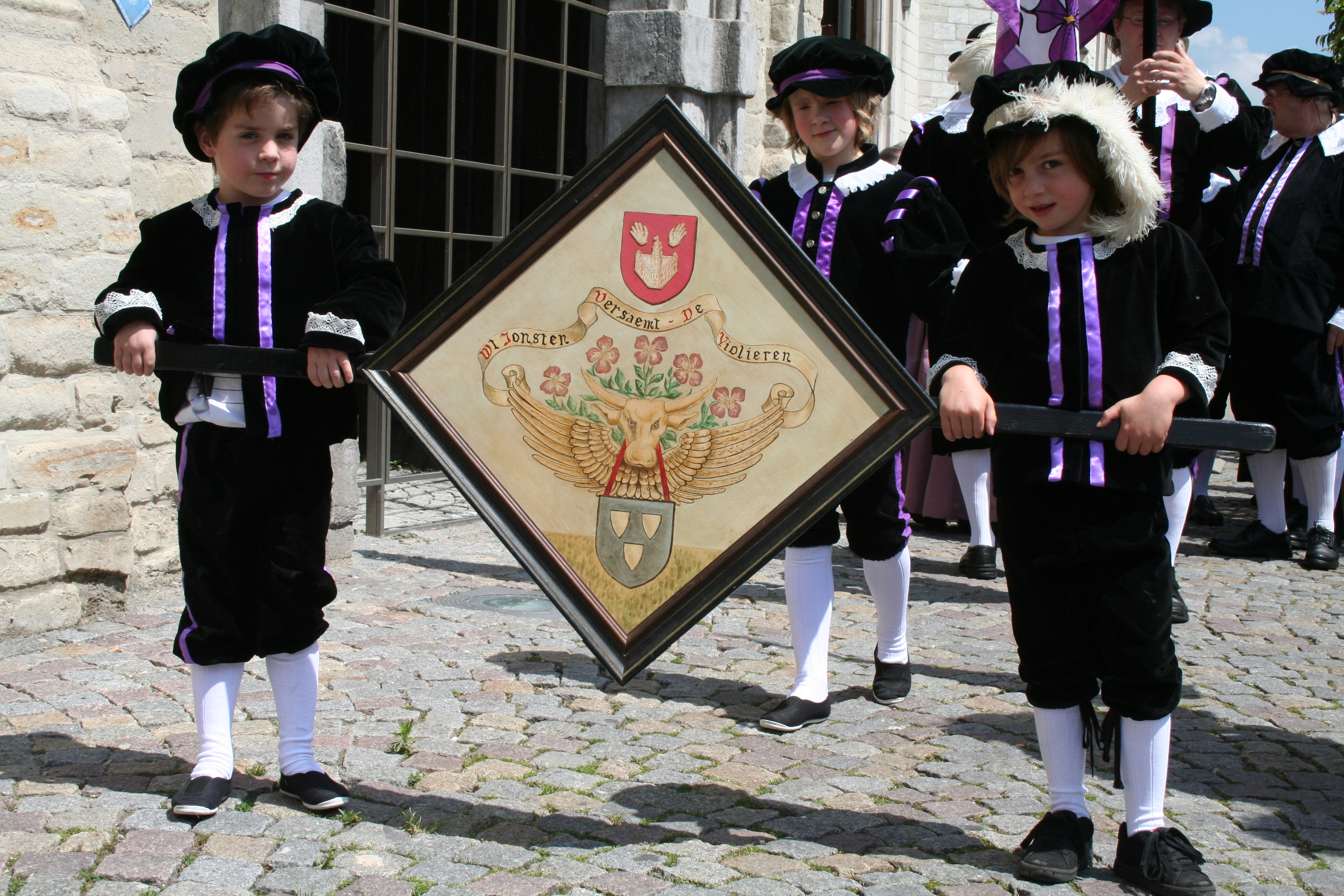
The Violieren in the procession of 2009 in Mechelen.
