= Michael Walpole =

English Jesuit and controversialist

Michael Walpole (1570–1624?), was an English Jesuit and controversialist.

== Life ==
Walpole, youngest of the four brothers of Henry Walpole, was baptised at Docking, Norfolk, on 1 October 1570. When John Gerard landed in Norfolk in 1588, he made the acquaintance of the Docking household, and young Michael attached himself to the Jesuit. When Henry Walpole was taken prisoner at Flushing, Michael went to his assistance and procured his ransom.

He entered the Society of Jesus on 7 September 1593. Doña Luisa de Carvajal came to England in 1606, and he appears to have been her confessor or spiritual adviser. In 1610, while in attendance on her, he was arrested and thrown into prison; but on the intervention of the Spanish ambassador Gondomar he was released, though compelled to leave the country.

In 1613, he returned to England in company with Gondomar, when Doña Luisa's house was broken into and the lady imprisoned. Walpole narrowly escaped arrest. When Doña Luisa died in 1614, Walpole was with her, and he accompanied her body on its removal to Spain next year, and died some time after 12 August 1624.

== Works ==
Walpole wrote a number of books, including:

- A Treatise on the Subjection of Princes to God and the Church, St. Omer, 1608, 4to.
- Five Books of Philosophical Comfort, with Marginal Notes, translated from the Latin of Boethius, London, 1609, 8vo.
- Admonition to the English Catholics concerning the Edict of King James, St. Omer, 1610, 4to.
- The Lyf of the Mother Teresa of Jesus (Mechelen: Henry Jaye, 1611), the first English translation of the autobiography of Teresa of Avila
- Anti-Christ Extant, against George Downham, St. Omer, 1613–14, 2 vols. 4to; 2nd edit. 1632.
- Life of St. Ignatius of Loyola, St. Omer, 1616, 12mo: a translation of Ribadeneyra, which was often reprinted.
