= Blazon (rhetoric) =

Poetry form

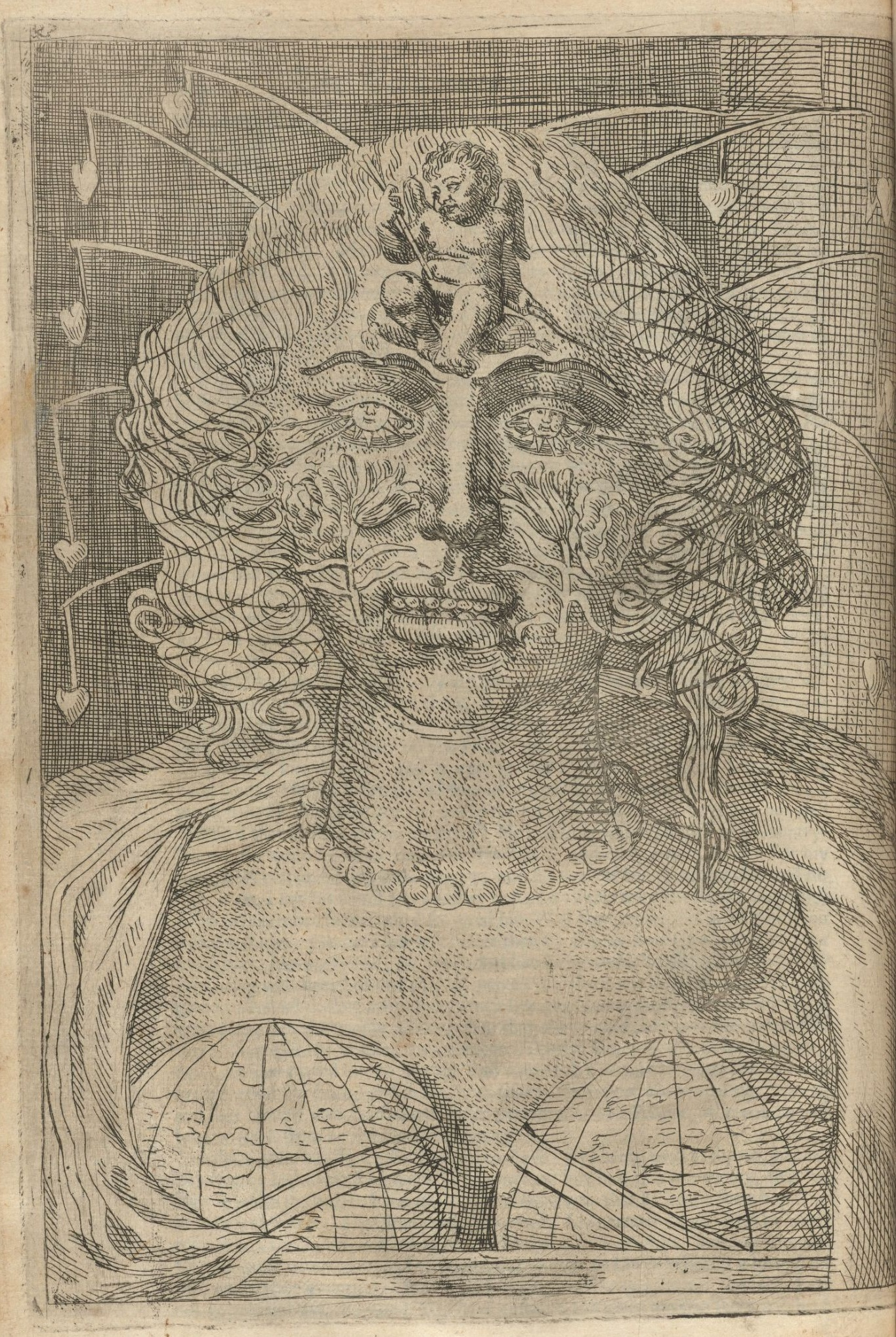
An illustration from the anti-romance Le Berger Extravagant (The extravagant shepherd); depicted is a satirical literalism of a blason

Blason (or blazon; also known as effictio) is a form of poetry and a rhetorical device in which a subject— typically female— is itemized and described, typically using metaphor and simile, to idealize and beautify its subject.

== Etymology ==
The term originally comes from the heraldic term "blazon" in French heraldry, which means either the codified description of a coat of arms or the coat of arms itself. The Dutch term is Blazoen, and in either Dutch or French, the term is often used to refer to the coat of arms of a chamber of rhetoric.

The term forms the root of the modern words "emblazon", which means to celebrate or adorn with heraldic markings, and "blazoner", one who emblazons.

== History and use ==
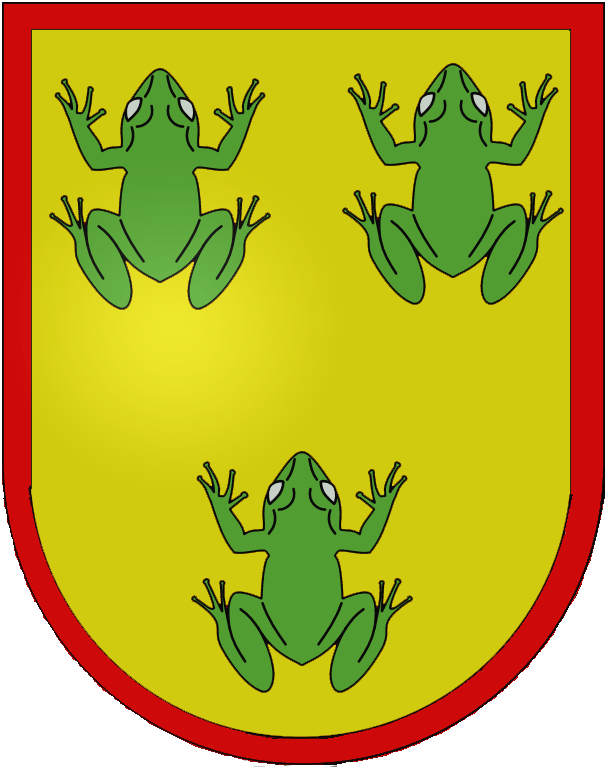
Blason de Clovis

Blason poetry was popularized by Petrarch and used extensively by Elizabethan-era poets. The terms "blason", "blasonner", "blasonneur" were used in 16th-century French literature by poets who, following Clément Marot in 1536, practised a genre of poems that praised a woman by singling out different parts of her body and finding appropriate metaphors and similes to compare them with. It is still being used with that meaning in literature and especially in poetry. Edmund Spencer uses a blazon in Epithalamium:

Her goodly eyes like sapphires shining bright, Her forehead ivory white,
Her cheeks like apples which the sun hath rudded,
Her lips like cherries charming men to bite,
Her breasts like to a bowl of cream uncrudded,
Her paps like lilies budded,
Her snowy neck like to a marble tower,
And all her body like a palace fair.

One famous example of such a celebratory poem, ironically rejecting each proposed stock metaphor, is William Shakespeare's Sonnet 130:

My mistress' eyes are nothing like the sun;
Coral is far more red than her lips' red;
If snow be white, why then her breasts are dun;
If hairs be wires, black wires grow on her head.
I have seen roses damasked, red and white,
But no such roses see I in her cheeks,
And in some perfumes is there more delight
Than in the breath that from my mistress reeks.
I love to hear her speak, yet well I know,
That music hath a far more pleasing sound.
I grant I never saw a goddess go;
My mistress when she walks treads on the ground.
And yet, by heaven, I think my love as rare
As any she belied with false compare.

=== Contreblason ===
The contreblason (anti-blason) is a parody of a blason in which the author mocks its typically-female subject through highlighting the subject's unattractive parts. Well known poets of contreblasons include Clément Marot and Maurice Scève. In Menaphon, Robert Greene mockingly writes:

Thy teeth like to the tusks of fattest swine,
Thy speech is like the thunder in the air:
Would God thy toes, thy lips, and all were mine.

== Related phrases ==
Blason draws on Petrarchan conventions of representing the female beloved in Petrarch's Canzoniere of the 14th century. Petrarch never offers a complete picture of his beloved Laura, but depicts her only as parts of a woman. The French Blason tradition can also be considered anti-Petrarchan, as it moves away from the adulatory tone of the Petrarchan sonnet (Petrarchism was so pervasive in the Renaissance, it also included subversion of Petrarchan conventions). The term Blason populaire is a phrase in which one culture or ethnic group increases its own self-esteem by belittling others e.g. Samuel Johnson's description that "The noblest prospect which a Scotsman ever sees, is the high road that leads him to England!". This term originated from Alfred Canel's travelogue Blason Populaire de la Normandie (1859), in which people from Normandy boasted about themselves while sneering at other regions.

The genre also spawned contreblasons, in which the poet mocked unattractive parts of a woman's body.

== Related genres ==
Other cultures have types of blason poetry. For instance, Ethiopia has a genre of poetry called Mälkəˀ, meaning "image" or "portrait,” generally written in the language of Gəˁəz in honor of sacred individuals. Such poems list and eulogize the spiritual powers of the saint, using the metaphor of various body parts, starting with the hair, eyelashes, tongue, and lips, moving down to the throat, breasts, and belly, and from there down to legs and toes, among other parts. For an example, see the poem Mälkəˀa Wälättä Ṗeṭros:

Hail to your back, which cast off luxurious cloaks,
and to your chest, a banquet-table for the wretched.
Walatta Petros, our mother, lover of fasting and prayer,
request forgiveness for our sins before the Lord:
Thus we implore you, we who are yours.

== See also ==
- Emblem book
- Coat of arms
- Blazon
