= Goudbloem =

Coordinates: 51.2203°N 4.4059°E

The Marigold
- De Goudbloem
- Formation: around 1490
- Dissolved: around 1654
- Type: Chamber of rhetoric
- Location: Antwerp
- Region served: Duchy of Brabant
- Members: gildebroeders
- Official language: Dutch
- Honorary president: Hooftman
- Chairman: Prince
- Executive officer: Deken

The Goudbloem (marigold) was a chamber of rhetoric, a society to promote poetry and drama, that dated back to the 15th century in Antwerp. It was one of three drama guilds in the city, the other two being the Violieren and the Olyftack. It ceased to exist around 1654. The Violieren and Olyftack merged in 1660, and survived until 1762.

== History ==
The Goudbloem had particular links to the urban aristocracy (patricians) and officeholders, while the Violieren was associated with artists and intellectuals (and had ties to the Guild of St Luke) and the Olyftack primarily consisted of merchants and tradesmen.

The earliest mention of the society is of a performance in 1490, after which the city magistrates granted the chamber an annual subsidy of £3 Brabant (the same amount received by the Violieren). The chamber competed in the Landjuweel (a rhetoric competition open to contenders from throughout the Duchy of Brabant) in Mechelen in 1515, in Diest in 1521, in Brussels in 1532, in Mechelen in 1535, in Diest in 1541 and in Antwerp (hosted by the Violieren) in 1561. Of the three Antwerp chambers it was the one most closely associated with Protestant sympathies, and it took the longest to recover from the neglect and suppressions that followed the Fall of Antwerp in 1585. The chamber was officially reinstituted in 1616, and took part in the rhetoric competition hosted by the Peoene (Peony) in Mechelen on 3 May 1620, taking first prize for most triumphant decoration, second prize for most triumphant arrival through the streets, and third prize for best recitation.

At the joyous reception in Antwerp of the new governor general, Cardinal-Infante Ferdinand of Austria, in 1635, the Goudbloem put on a tableau vivant intended to demonstrate "that the hope of all the Low Countries rests upon the Prince Cardinal".

The last recorded public performance was in 1649, and there are no records of the chamber's existence after 1654.

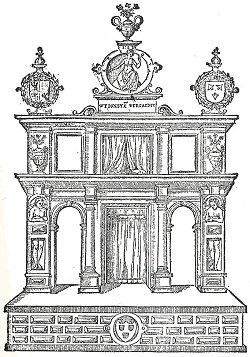
An engraving of the stage for a 1561 rhetoric competition held in Antwerp

== Organisation ==
The leading officers of the chamber were the hooftman, a sort of honorary president, the prince, and the dean (deken). The fee-paying members, or gildebroeders, enjoyed not only freedom from militia duty but the same type of social provision that most guilds provided: attendance at the funerals of deceased members, the provision of wedding presents for members getting married, and collections to support sick or impoverished members.
