= Antoon Faydherbe =

Antoine Faydherbe
- Born: Mechelen
- Died: 8 October 1653
- Education: apprentice to Filip Kerael
- Known for: sculpture
- Movement: Baroque
- Spouse: Charlotte van Casteele

Antoon Faydherbe or Antoine Fayd'herbe (died 1653) was a sculptor, who lived and worked in Mechelen, in the Southern Netherlands.

== Life ==
He was apprenticed to Filip Kerael in Mechelen's Guild of Saint Luke in 1598 and was awarded the freedom of the craft on 11 July 1605.

He sold a Madonna, two angels, a St Elizabeth and a St Augustine (all polychromed by his brother Hendrik Faydherbe) to the hospital in Hulst, and a statue of Our Lady of Scherpenheuvel to the church of St John the Baptist in Mechelen. The city accounts show him carrying out minor works in 1634–1635 for the formal reception of the new governor general, the Cardinal-Infante Ferdinand of Austria.

His sister, Maria Faydherbe, was also a sculptor, as was his nephew, Lucas Faydherbe.

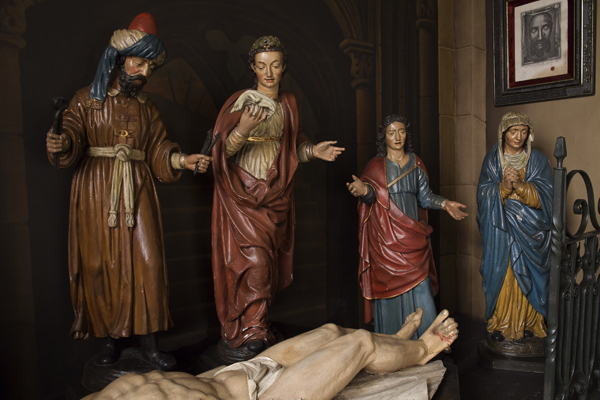
Lamentation of Christ (Church of Our Lady Dendermonde)

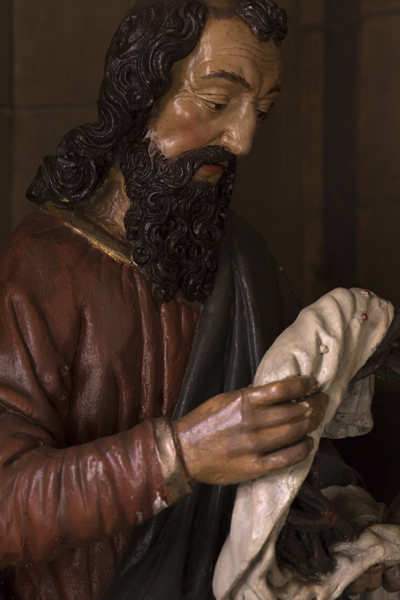

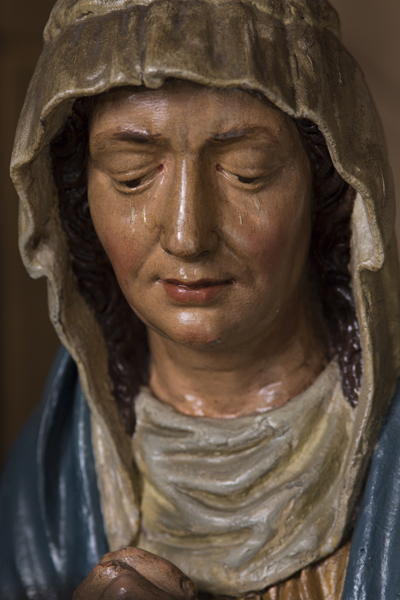

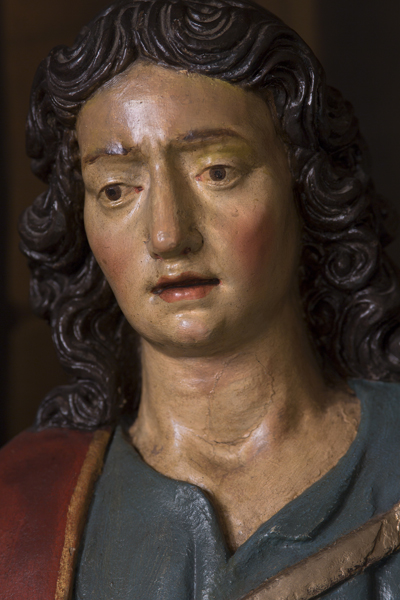

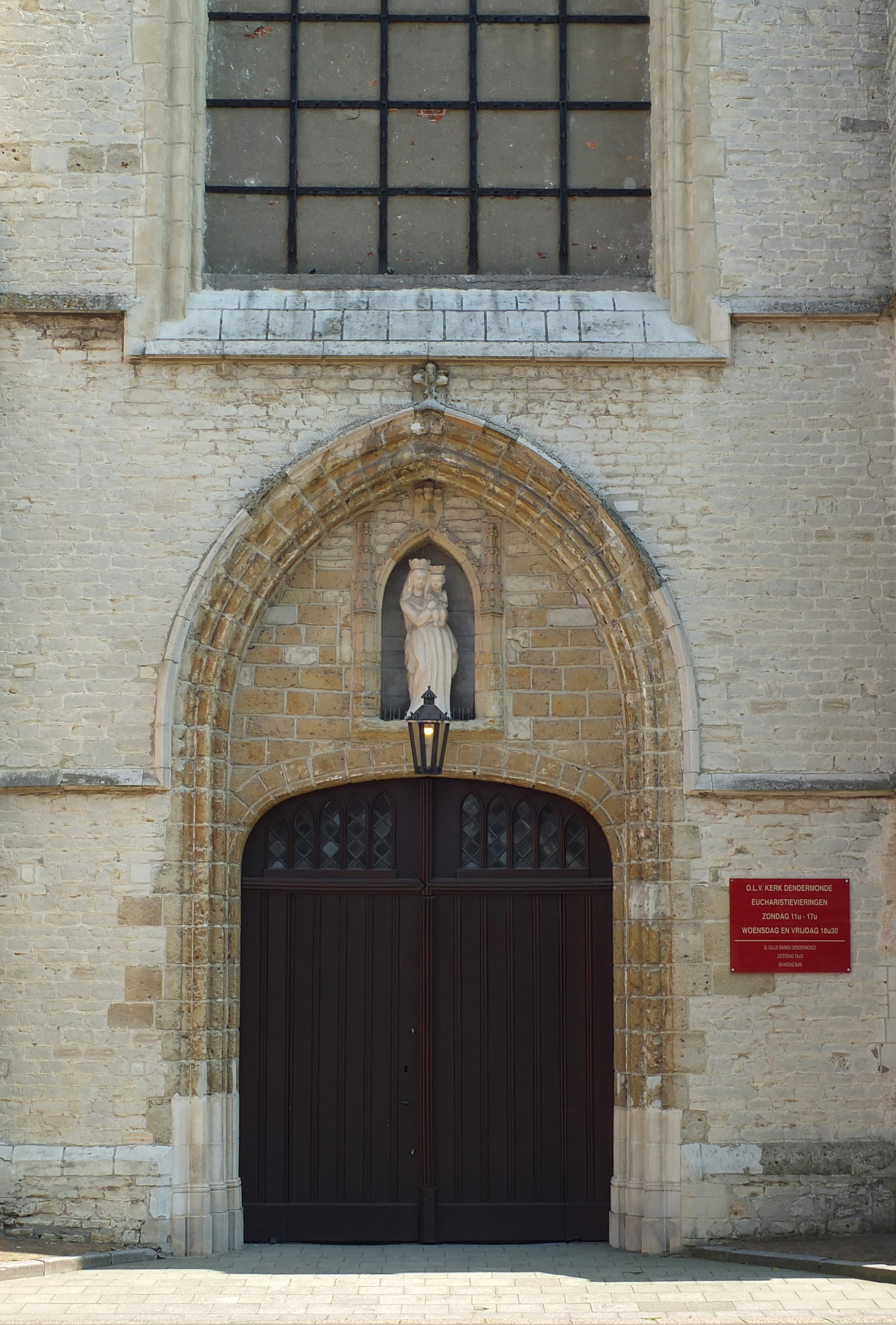
Dendermonde Church of Our Lady, sculpture after Faydherbe
