= Maria Faydherbe =

Flemish sculptor

- Born: 1587; Mechelen
- Died: 1643 (aged 55–56); Mechelen
- Known for: sculpture
- Movement: Baroque

Maria Faydherbe, referred to in the French literature as Marie Fayd'herbe (1587–1643) was a Flemish sculptor who lived and worked in Mechelen, then a city in the Spanish Netherlands.

== Life ==
Maria Faydherbe was born in Mechelen in 1587 as one of three children of a brewer, who all became sculptors. Her brothers were Hendrik and Antoon Faydherbe. She was the aunt of Hendrik's son, the famous sculptor Lucas Faydherbe.

== Conflict with the local Guild ==
A Maria Faydherbe wrote on 20 December 1632 to the city council of Mechelen with a request to be enrolled in the Guild of Saint Luke. It was claimed that in her letter she extolled her own skills which she deemed not to be inferior to those of the members of the Guild whom she called 'dozijnwerkers' (workers by the dozen). Eight sculptor-members of the Guild reacted to her letter and her statements, which they deemed damaging to their reputation, by letter of 12 January 1633. They declared themselves ready to enter into a competition with Maria Faydherbe. The competition was to be supervised by the aldermen of the city. Whether the competition ever took place, and what its outcome was, is not known.

As Maria was not able to become a member of the Guild she was forced to work in her family's workshop, without being able to sign her own output, and indeed probably having her work signed by her male relations. The conflict between Maria and the Guild has also been interpreted as a conflict between the Renaissance style and the new Baroque movement rather than solely as a conflict between the sexes.

== Known work ==
The collection of the Victoria and Albert Museum holds an alabaster sculpture of The Virgin and Child that is ascribed to Maria Faydherbe on the basis of a monogram reading MF S, taken to signify "Maria Faydherbe Sculpsit". This discovery of a signed (monogrammed) work seems to indicate Maria did in fact sign (some of) her work. Un Crocifisso in legno, alto 33 cm, firmato e una statuetta della Vergine col Bambino in legno di bosso, alta 17,1 cm, firmata e datata 1633; entrambe le opere sono nel Museo Hof van Busleyden di Melechen B. Una statua di Vergine col Bambino, in legno, alta 15 cm, e firmata, è conservata a Lovanio (B) nel “M-Museum Leuven”.
