= Thomas Wright (controversialist) =

English Roman Catholic controversialist

Thomas Wright (d. 1624?), was an English Roman Catholic controversialist, who was ordained priest in the reign of Queen Mary, and became one of the readers of divinity in the English College, Douai at the time of its foundation in 1569.

== Life ==
It is said that he had previously taught theology and Hebrew at Milan, and had also been professor of divinity both in Spain and at Louvain. He graduated D.D., and was ‘always regarded as one of the ablest divines and controvertists of his time.’

In 1577 he was working in Yorkshire, and was soon afterwards committed as a prisoner to York Castle, where he engaged in a conference with Dean Hutton and other Church of England clergy. He was ‘tossed about from prison to prison till 1585, when he was shipped off at Hull, and sent into banishment.’

He took refuge at the English College of Douay, then temporarily removed to Rheims. He was vice-president and then became Dean of Courtray. In 1622 he was at Antwerp, where Marco Antonio de Dominis, Archbishop of Spalato, repeated before him the recantation of Protestantism formerly made to the pope's nuncio at Brussels. Wright died about 1624.

== Legacy ==
Wright has been very doubtfully credited with several religious tracts, which are said to have been published anonymously, but he has been confused with other writers with the same name. No list of his works can be given with confidence.

It is probable that he was author of Certaine Articles discovering the Palpable Absurdities of the Protestants Religion (Antwerp, 1600), and The Substance of the Lord's Supper (1610, 12mo). The first of these was answered by Edward Bulkeley in An Apologie for the Religion established in the Church of England. Being an Answer to a Pamphlet by T. W[right] (1602).

== Notes ==
Attribution

This article incorporates text from a publication now in the public domain: Cooper, Thompson (1885–1900). "Wright, Thomas (d.1624?)". Dictionary of National Biography. London: Smith, Elder & Co.
