= Peoene =

The Peony
- De Peoene
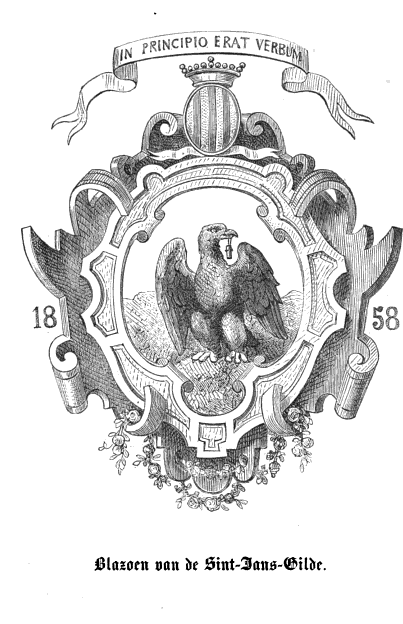
- Emblem of the reconstituted guild, 1858
- Formation: before 1472; refounded 1858
- Type: Chamber of rhetoric
- Official language: Dutch

The Peoene (Peony), also known as the Sint-Jansgilde (Guild of St John), was a chamber of rhetoric dating back to the 15th century in Mechelen.

== History ==
The oldest mention of the Peoene is in a city accounts book from 1472. The guild took part in landjuweel competitions in Leuven (1478), Antwerp (1496), Herentals (1510), Leuven (1518), Diest (1521), Brussels (1532), Antwerp (1561), and Brussels (1562). The guild hosted such competitions in Mechelen in 1515 and 1535.

Activities were suspended in 1585, in the midst of the Habsburg reconquest of the Spanish Netherlands. An application to recommence activities in 1593 was rejected, but in 1617 the chamber received a charter from the Archdukes Albert and Isabella.

A rhetoric competition drawing participants from across the Low Countries was hosted by the Peoene in Mechelen on 3 May 1620. Plays written by the guild's dean, the silversmith Jan Thieullier, and factor, Hendrik Faydherbe, were performed to entertain the participants. The entertainments, together with the entries to the competition, were published by Henry Jaye, printer to the city, in a luxury volume entitled De schadt-kiste der philosophen ende poeten.

The guild was suppressed in 1795, during the French occupation, but was refounded in 1858.
