= Chamber of rhetoric =

Type of dramatic society in the Low Countries

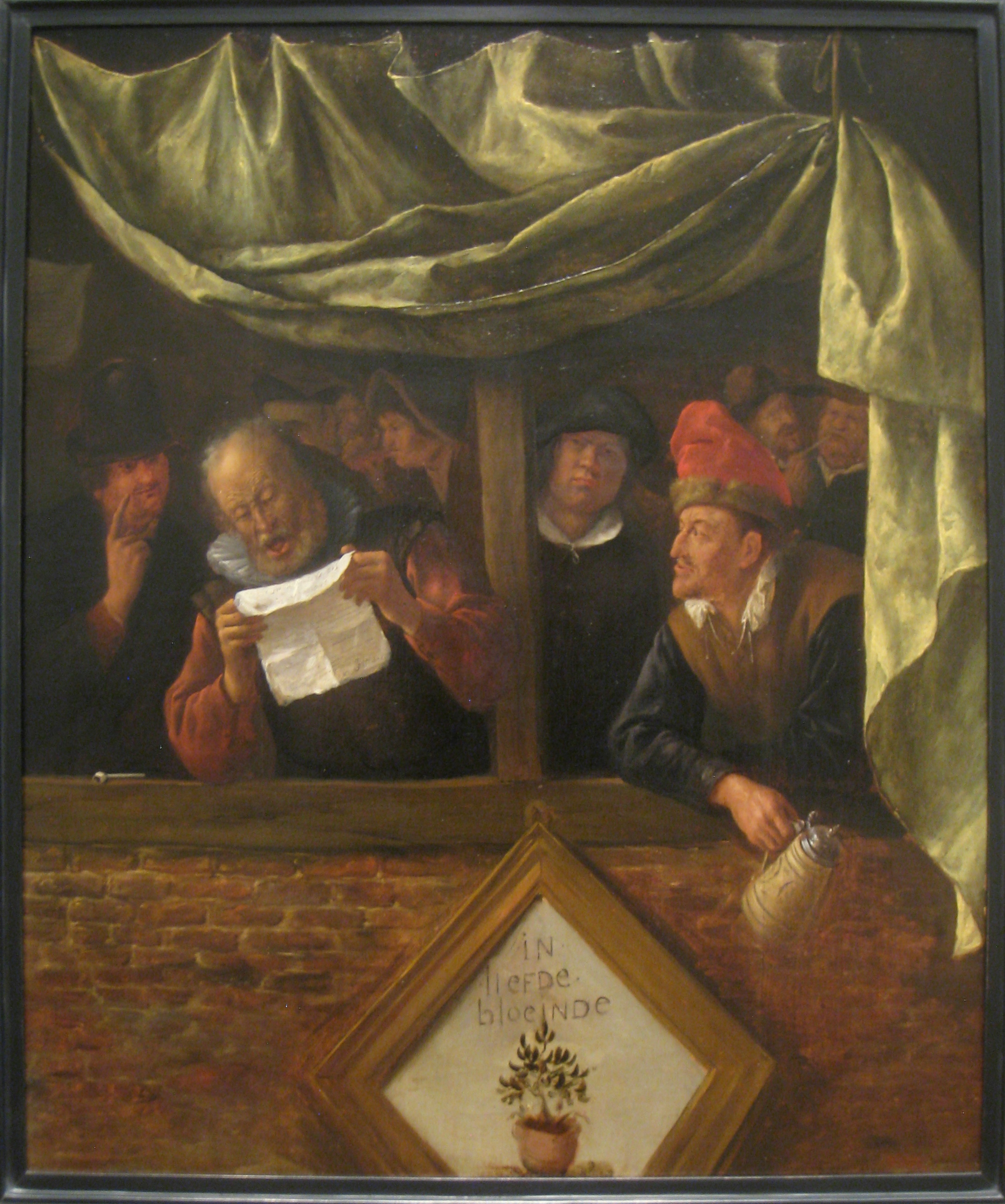
The Rhetoricians, c. 1655, by Jan Steen. The painting depicts a rederijker reading his poem (blason), while hanging over the balcony the blazon of his chamber of rhetoric can be seen; in this case the Amsterdam society "Egelantier", whose symbol was a wild rose (egelantier) and whose motto was "In Liefde Bloeiend".

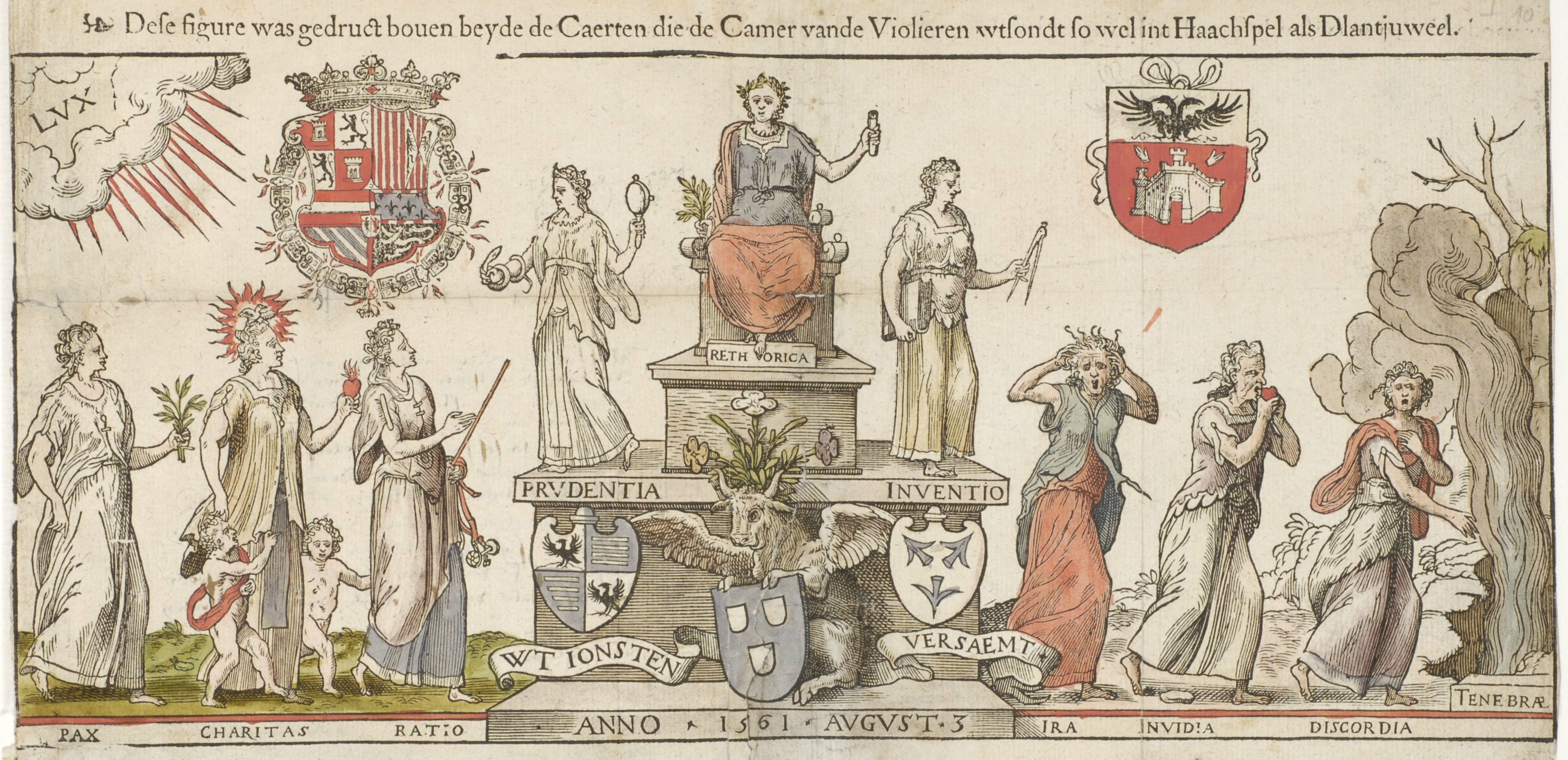
Printed invitation to other chambers of rhetoric by the Antwerp Violieren, for a landjuweel event, lasting 19 days, in 1561

'Chambers of rhetoric(Dutch: rederijkerskamers) were dramatic societies in the Low Countries. Their members were called Rederijkers (singular: Rederijker), from the French word "rhétoricien", and during the 15th and 16th centuries were mainly interested in dramas and lyrics. These societies were closely connected with local civic leaders and their public plays were a form of early public relations for the city.

== History ==
The first chambers of rhetoric were founded in Flanders around the 15th century; they later flowered in Holland, where they were an important part of the literary scene in the Dutch Golden Age and experimented with poetic form and structure. Most Dutch cities sponsored a chamber of rhetoric, and many cities had more than one, which competed with each other during prize contests. The building that currently houses the Frans Hals Museum was built with the proceeds of a lottery in which chambers of rhetoric participated from all over the country. The Haarlem society Trou moet Blycken still has many of the blazons that it kept as host of that lottery.

At the start of the 16th century, Antwerp had three rederijker societies, the "Violieren", the "Olijftak", and the "Goudbloem", while Brussels and Ghent each had four rederijker societies.

An important chamber of rhetoric in the Netherlands was "De Egelantier" in Amsterdam: Coster, Bredero, Hooft and Roemer Visscher were all members of this society. During the Protestant Reformation the society sided with the reformers against the city government and enjoyed its most blooming period despite receiving very little funding from official sources.

Because many of the rederijkers were by definition amateurs, the literary quality of their work was often rather low, and in the 18th century, some chambers of rhetoric were spoken of with contempt. One work of literary historical importance that came from the Rederijkers is the play Elckerlijc (Everyman).

By the 17th century many chambers enjoyed the services of semi-professional actors, personagiën, who did not pay membership fees and worked in exchange for free food and drink (provided after rehearsals and performances) and for exemption from other civic obligations.

== Social functions ==
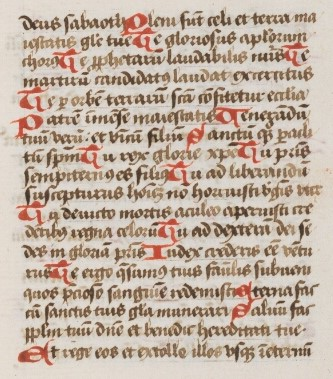
Excerpt of a text by rhetorician Anthonis de Roovere, from a 15th or 16th-century manuscript of Middle Dutch and Latin devotions

Apart from providing entertainment (recitations, plays, performances) during civic festivities, and maintaining literary contacts between cities, chambers of rhetoric had many of the typical social functions of a guild, confraternity, the Puy, or the Meistersingers such as attending members' funerals, holding collections for sick or impoverished members, and providing wedding presents for members getting married.

== See also ==
- List of chambers of rhetoric
- Medieval Dutch literature
- Flemish literature
