= Adriaan Teding van Berkhout =

Dutch jurist

Crest of the Teding van Berkhout family (Note: Van der Aa states that this actually was the crest of another branch of the family: Teding van Cranenburch, but that Adriaan adopted it for himself; Cf. Van der Aa, p. 418)

Adriaan Teding van Berkhout (Hoorn, 1571 or 1572? — The Hague, 13 August 1620) was a Dutch jurist, justice in the Hof van Holland, and politician of the Dutch Republic. He was a friend of Johan van Oldenbarnevelt, who tried to warn the latter of his impending arrest before the Trial of Oldenbarnevelt, Grotius and Hogerbeets.

== Personal life ==
Adriaan was born the son of Hoorn burgomaster Jan Teding van Berkhout and Levina de Huybert. He was educated at a latin school in Leiden and subsequently studied law at Leiden University where he was enrolled as a student under the name Hadrianus Berckhout on 11 February 1588. He received his doctoral law degree from the University of Orléans on 10 April 1595.

He married Geertruid van Gael in Monnikendam in 1597, with whom he had one son (Volkert), and after her death, on 25 May 1604 with Margaretha Duyst van Beresteyn in Delft. With the latter he had the following children: Lidia (who died young), Johan (who was deaf-mute), Paulus, Lydia (who married Govert Brasser, pensionary of Delft), Geertruid (who married Hugo Brasser, baljuw of Haringskerspel), Cornelia (who married lieutenant-admiral Maarten Harpertsz. Tromp), Maria (who married Nicolaas de Bye, pensionary of Monnikendam and later justice in the Hoge Raad van Holland en Zeeland), and Margaretha (who married jonkheer Jan van Egmond van den Nieuburg, schepen of Alkmaar and bewindhebber of the VOC).

== Career ==
After finishing his studies Adriaan was appointed pensionary of the city of Monnikendam in 1596 and promoted to treasurer of that city on 29 September 1598. On 6 May 1605 he was enrolled in the court of audit of the States of Holland and West Friesland, for which he moved to The Hague. There he became a member of the Court of Audit of the Dutch Republic on 31 March 1611.

On 6 May 1613 he was appointed a member of the Council of State. On 28 March 1614 he was appointed justice in the Hof van Holland. As such he was part of a commission that was sent in 1615 by the States of Holland to mediate in a conflict within the city government of Leeuwarden.

In 1614 the States of Holland promulgated a Resolution entitled "For the Peace of the Church", promoted by Oldenbarnevelt and Hugo Grotius to enforce toleration between partisans of two warring theologians, Jacobus Arminius (who called themselves the "Remonstrants') and Franciscus Gomarus (who were called the "Counter-Remonstrants"). The enforcement of this Resolution caused discord within the Hof van Holland, with Rombout Hogerbeets and Reinoud van Brederode, the president of the Hoge Raad, joined by Adriaan, opposing Counter-Remonstrant sympathizers on the court. The conflict escalated after the States of Holland adopted the Sharp Resolution. Adriaan was a good friend of Oldenbarnevelt and when the States General authorized the stadtholder and Captain general of the Dutch States Army Maurice, Prince of Orange to arrest Oldenbarnevelt on 28 August 1618, Adriaan went to warn the latter of the impending arrest together with another member of the court. But Oldenbarnevelt ignored the warning and was arrested the next morning. The following trial brought peril for Adriaan also, because he had imprudently written a compromising letter to Oldenbarnevelt that was found during a search of the latter's correspondence by one of the judges in the trial, Albert Bruinink (a colleague of Adriaan). But Bruinink returned the letter to Adriaan without denouncing him.

Adriaan was one of the investors in the venture of the draining of the Beemster polder. He invested also in the Magelaanse Compagnie (one of the would-be competitors of the VOC)

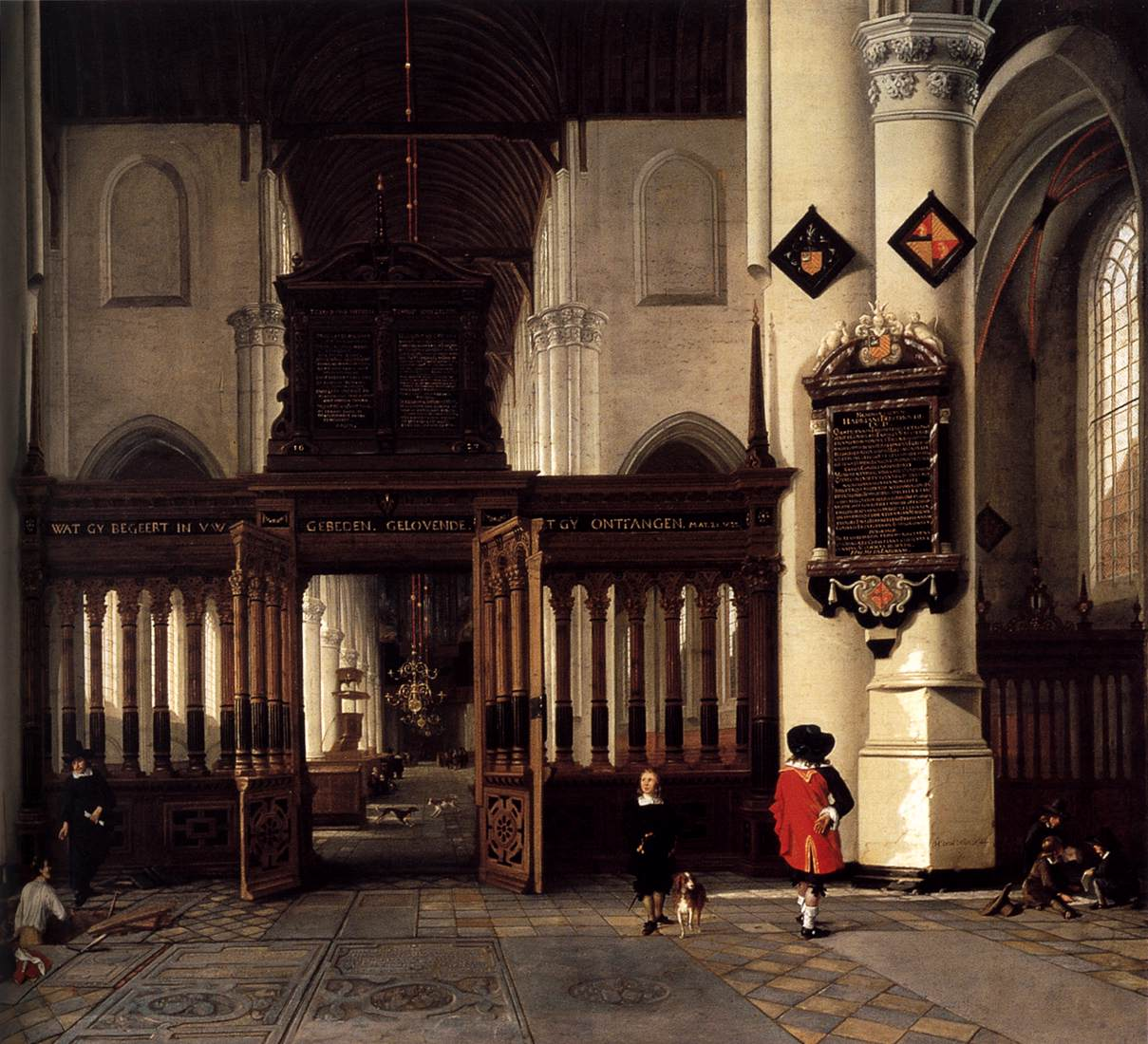
Church interior by Hendrick Cornelisz. van Vliet showing the Memorial Tablet for Adriaan Teding van Berkhout

Adriaan died on 13 August 1620 in The Hague. He was buried in the Nieuwe Kerk (Delft), where a Memorial Tablet for him was hung that appears on a 1661 painting of the church interior by Hendrick Cornelisz. van Vliet

== Notes and references ==
=== Sources ===
- Aa, A.J. van der (1854). "Berkhout (Adriaan Teding van), in: Biographisch Woordenboek der Nederlanden, deel 2, Eerste stuk". Huyghens ING (in Dutch). p. 418.
- Morren (1918). Blok, P.J. and P.C. Molhuysen (ed.). "Berkhout (Adriaan Teding van), in: Nieuw Nederlandsch Biografisch Woordenboek, Vol. 4". Huyghens ING (in Dutch). pp. 124–126.
