= Sharp Resolution =

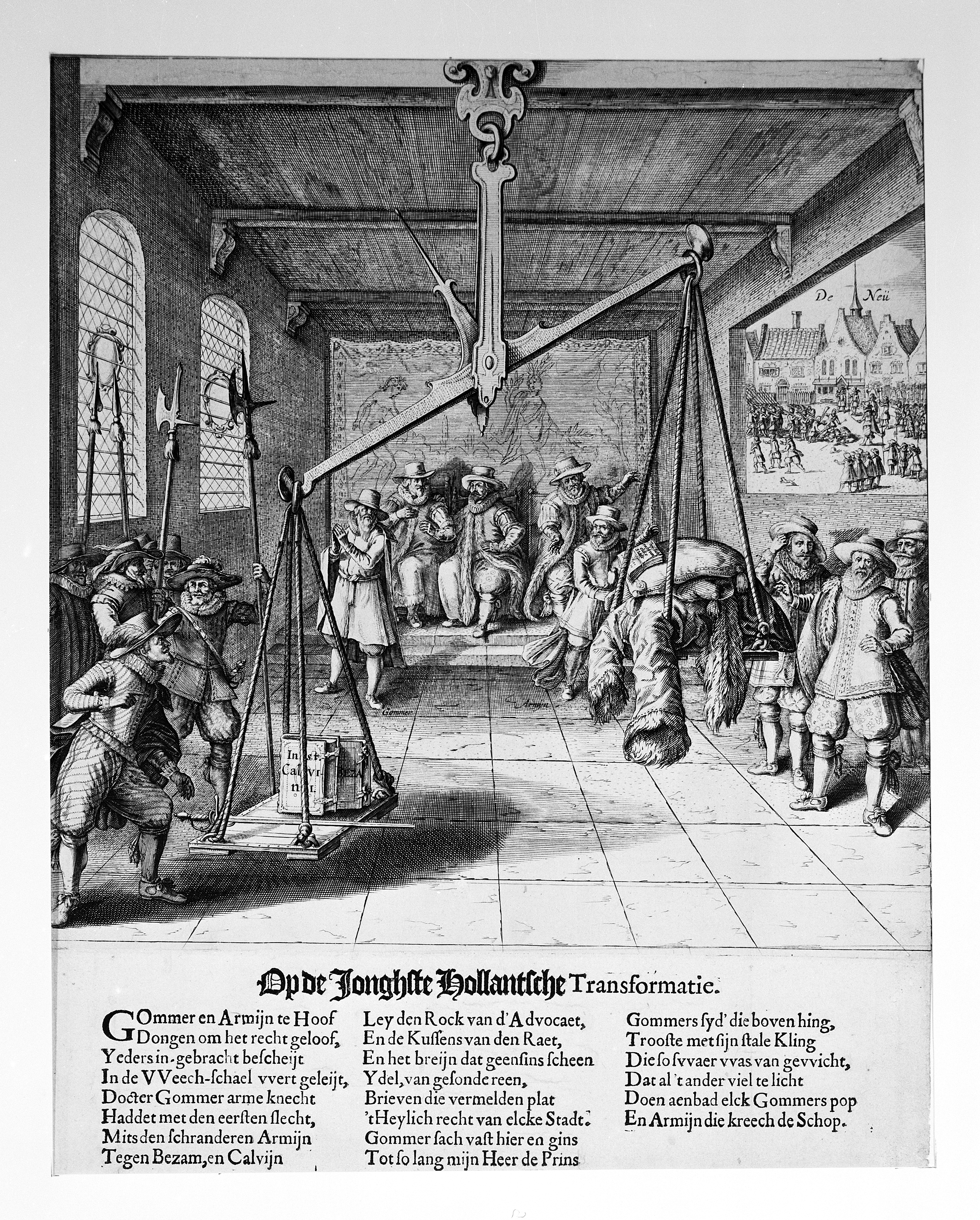
Cartoon (Note: The cartoon shows scales which are imbalanced. The "heavy" side has works by John Calvin and Theodore Beza in it, to which Prince Maurice has added his sword. The other side has the coat of Oldenbarnevelt and the "pillows of the council" in it, together with the privileges of the city. Oldenbarnevelt stands on this side of the scales, together with two colleagues. In the background stand Gomarus and Arminius. Through the window a scene of the disarmament of the Waardgelders in Utrecht is visible. Below the cartoon a poem by Joost van den Vondel is printed.) by Salomon Savery about the Coup d'État by Prince Maurice of 1618

The Sharp Resolution (Dutch: Scherpe Resolutie (Note: The name of the resolution has different explanations. Wijne refers to an annotation by Grotius in his Apologeticus of 1622 (p. 212) who says that "severe diseases require sharp remedies"; Cf. Wijne, p. 243 and note 4. He also cites on the same page a pamphlet in which the term was used. Elsewhere the origin of the name is cited as a letter by Prince Maurice to one of his partisans in which he uses this qualification.)) was a resolution taken by the States of Holland and West Friesland on 4 August 1617 on the proposal of the Land's Advocate of Holland, Johan van Oldenbarnevelt, in the course of the Arminian-Gomarist, or Remonstrant/Counter-Remonstrant controversy that was disturbing the internal politics of the Dutch Republic during the Twelve Years' Truce. The resolution brought serious disagreements about the interpretation of the Union of Utrecht (the Republic's "constitution"), that had long simmered, into focus. It started a political conflict that eventually brought down the Oldenbarnevelt-regime and led to Oldenbarnevelt's arrest on 29 August 1618, together with his colleagues Hugo Grotius, Rombout Hogerbeets, and Gilles van Ledenberg, and their 1619 trial, which resulted in their conviction of high treason, and Oldenbarnevelt's execution on 13 May 1619.

== Background ==
Article XIII of the Union of Utrecht stipulated that the regulation of religion was a matter of policy for the individual provinces (so not of the "Generality"). It first reaffirmed the provision in the Pacification of Ghent, which gave the States of Holland and the States of Zeeland full discretion in religious matters in their jurisdictions, while the other provinces were constrained by the provisions of the "religious peace" previously promulgated by Archduke Matthias. (Note: At the time the treaty was concluded (January 1579) the signatories were still formally members of the Union of Brussels who accepted Matthias as governor-general of the Habsburg Netherlands. Matthias had promulgated the "religious peace" (on the advice of William the Silent) in 1578) The article also provided that no province would be authorized to intervene in religious matters in another province. (Note: Finally the article stipulated that Freedom of Conscience was guaranteed for everybody, even where Freedom of Worship could be limited.) The States of Holland, the government of the province of Holland after 1588, took its responsibility serious and in 1590 made a regulation for the Dutch Reformed Church, which gave it great influence on the organisation of the church, the appointment and pay of its ministers, and the financial support of the congregations of the church. (Note: This made the Dutch Reformed Church almost, but not quite a State church, like the Church of England. But Israel prefers to use the designation "Public church", because the civil authorities refrained from interfering in doctrinal matters. Other churches, like the Lutheran church and the Mennonites were tolerated, while Roman Catholic public worship was initially prohibited.) In itself this was acceptable to the church as long as its autonomy, especially in doctrinal matters, was respected. But the fact that the parties in the debate between the followers of two rival theologians, Jacobus Arminius and Franciscus Gomarus at the University of Leiden about the doctrine of Predestination asked for the intervention of the public authorities made it inevitable that the government became involved. Some of the Regenten that made up the States and the local vroedschappen became partisans themselves. Others, like Grotius, tried to find a solution that would at least preserve the public peace. But the attempt to impose "tolerance" in doctrinal matters was itself seen as doctrinal encroachment, especially by the Counter-Remonstrants as the followers of Gomarus were known. The Counter-Remonstrants demanded that the doctrinal conflict should be decided in a National Synod, but this was unacceptable to Oldenbarnevelt, because this would make it a matter of national policy, and not of provincial policy, as prescribed by art. XIII of the Union of Utrecht.

The dispute got out of hand when the members of the Dutch Reformed congregations took to the streets in 1614 and later years. This led to mob violence by which the city governments felt threatened, also because the schutterijen, who were responsible for keeping the public peace were often made up of Counter-Remonstrants themselves, and refused to protect the Remonstrant victims of the violence. Similarly, the stadtholder Prince Maurice, who was ex officio commander-in-chief of the Dutch States Army, was sympathetic to the Counter-Remonstrants, and refused to let his troops intervene to restore order. This came to a head when Counter-Remonstrants in The Hague forcibly occupied the Cloister Church for their services on 9 July 1617. The local authorities did not dare to intervene, and Prince Maurice (Note: Calling him "Prince" Maurice here is a bit of an anachronism, as he only inherited that title after his elder brother Philip William died in February 1618. Before that he was just Count of Nassau.) made his sympathies clear by attending church services in this church.

== The resolution ==
As The Hague was the de facto capital of the Republic where both the States of Holland and the States General of the Netherlands held their meetings, this defiance of the government was considered intolerable. Oldenbarnevelt overreacted by proposing a resolution to the States of Holland on 4 August 1617 which contained the following four points:

1. The States came out explicitly against convening a National Synod of the Dutch Reformed Church;
2. This decision could not be protested before the Hof van Holland or the Hoge Raad van Holland en Zeeland, but only by petitioning the States directly;
3. The local authorities in Holland were authorized to start recruiting mercenaries by the name of Waardgelders (Note: The name is derived from the German word Wartegelt (retainer). It was usually reserved for mercenaries who were hired to temporarily man the garrisons and fortresses when the States Field Army was out on campaign.) to help maintain civil peace in their jurisdictions;
4. The commanders of the Dutch States Army garrisons who were paid by the province of Holland were ordered to obey the local Holland city governments, and not the commander of the army, in case they were requested to give assistance in maintaining local order.

Immediately there arose political and constitutional difficulties with the resolution. It was a majority decision where "Counter-Remonstrant" cities like Amsterdam (represented by pensionary Adriaan Pauw) were outvoted by "Remonstrant" cities like Rotterdam (represented by its pensionary Grotius). Majority decisions were not unusual in the States of Holland, but the minority accused the majority of having the decision prepared in secret discussions, initiated by Oldenbarnevelt, although the latter always denied that. (Note: This accusation was one of the grounds for the court that convicted him in 1619 to declare him guilty of "leading a faction"; Wijne, pp. 248) However that may be, the minority never resigned itself to the decision, but remained steadfast in its opposition.

Nevertheless, in itself the decision to formally reject the convocation of a National Synod (as advocated by the Counter-Remonstrants) was certainly within the remit of the States, even though it might be considered imprudent to abandon the putative neutrality of the Holland authorities in the conflict. As the Union of Utrecht prohibited every province from interfering in the religious policy of another province, and as the States General were supposed to decide by unanimity, Oldenbarnevelt could reasonably expect that the Resolution effectively vetoed the plans to convoke the National Synod. But his opponents outmaneuvered him and in September 1617 a bare majority of four against three provinces voted to convene a National Synod by May 1618.

The fact that the States reserved the adjudication of conflicts arising out of the Resolution for themselves, thereby taking the highest courts of Holland "out of the loop," may seem objectionable to modern eyes, but the Separation of Powers doctrine had not yet been invented by this time and (like in most European countries) the courts acted in name of the sovereign power, who could take certain matters in its own hand, if it so desired. In the Republic the States of the provinces had assumed sovereignty after the Act of Abjuration. The States of Holland were therefore within their constitutional right.

This was not a matter of dispute. But the assertion of absolute sovereignty in the decision to authorise the recruitment of mercenary troops to help in maintaining public order clearly was. The sovereign States of the seven Dutch provinces had agreed to "pool" their military resources and to delegate external defense and foreign affairs to the States General in the Union of Utrecht treaty. But did they by this act of delegation also transfer part of their sovereignty to the States General? Oldenbarnevelt denied it and he steadfastly asserted the absolute sovereignty of the States of Holland in this case. (Note: This was to be a central tenet of the ideology of the Dutch States Party in later years.) His opponents, especially stadtholder Maurice, on the other hand, held the view that the States General were supreme in matters of defense and foreign policy. They therefore condemned this part of the Resolution as a breach of the Union of Utrecht, even though it could be argued that the authorization to employ Waardgelders was not a matter of external defense, but of maintenance of internal security.

Finally, the assertion that the federal troops that fell within the Holland repartitie (i.e. were paid from the contribution by Holland to the common defense budget) were first of all beholden to the Holland authorities, and not the stadtholder, was of course unacceptable to Maurice.

== Aftermath ==
Maurice and the Counter-Remonstrant party vehemently rejected the Resolution, but Maurice was slow in taking forceful action. So the recruitment of Waardgelders was allowed to proceed in a number of Holland cities. Even the States of Utrecht passed a similar resolution and allowed the raising of Waardgelders in the city of Utrecht. But after a while Maurice started to undermine the Oldenbarnevelt party by "turning" city governments in Holland and Gelderland (like Nijmegen and Brielle, both garrison towns) that supported the Remonstrant cause, by intimidation with the help of States-Army troops, thereby reducing Oldenbvarnevelt's majority in the States Also the States-Army garrisons of several towns refused to obey the Holland Gecommitteerde Raden (Executive of the States). Then, in March 1618, Maurice began to mobilize the five "Counter-Remonstrant" provinces in the States General. In May 1618 he managed to bring over the States of Overijssel (previously a Holland ally) to the Counter-Remonstrant side. The decision to convene a National Synod was then reaffirmed by a stronger majority in the States General, over the objection of the Holland delegation, led by Grotius. Grotius objected to the fact that the decision was not unanimous in a matter that the Union of Utrecht explicitly reserved for the individual, sovereign, provinces. In his view majority voting was only allowed in matters that had been delegated to the States General, like defense. Maurice objected in a speech to the States of Overijssel in May 1618 that the unrest about the religious controversy had become so serious that it had become a matter of internal security of the entire country, and therefore within the remit of the States General.

On 9 July 1618 the States General began deliberating the disbandment of the Waardgelder troops in Holland and Utrecht, over the objection of those provinces. The usual standpoints were exchanged and the States General overruled Holland and Utrecht by five votes to two. The States General then authorized the stadtholder to disband the Waardgelders in the city of Utrecht. In desperation Oldenbarnevelt sent Grotius and Hogerbeets to Utrecht province to summon the commanders of the federal troops in that province that were paid by Holland (i.e. most of them) to obey the States of Holland and not the stadtholder. This action was later to be the main article in the indictment before the court that tried Oldenbarnevelt, Grotius and the other "conspirators" for high treason. Maurice was not deterred and proceeded with the disarmament of the Waardgelders in Utrecht city. Next he purged the Delegated States of Utrecht, bringing that province into the Counter-Remonstrant fold.

Oldenbarnevelt then conceded defeat. The Remonstrant cities in Holland voluntarily disbanded their Waardgelders. Grotius and he also acquiesced in the convening of a National Synod. But these concessions were not enough. The States General passed a secret resolution on 28 August 1618, authorizing the stadtholder to arrest Oldenbarnevelt and his colleagues, which he did the next day. They were brought before an ad hoc court as the States General did not have its own judiciary. The defendants protested this in vain with an appeal to the principle of Jus de non evocando. Also the charge of high treason against the States General (Crimen laesae majestatis) was dubious on the by now familiar ground that the supremacy of the States General was contested, but the court unanimously convicted the defendants on 12 May 1619. Oldenbarnevelt was executed the next day. (Note: Ironically, the Counter-Remonstrant preacher Antonius Walaeus, who ministered to Oldenbarnevelt in the night before the latter's execution later asserted that Oldenbarnevelt turned out to have theological ideas that were much closer to those of Gomarus than those of Arminius on the doctrine of Predestination. Apparently, Oldenbarnevelt was therefore no Remonstrant personally; Cf. Blok, p. 474)

== Notes and references ==
=== Sources ===
- Blok, P.J. (1900). "History of the People of the Netherlands: The war with Spain". Google Books. G. P. Putnam's sons.
- Israel, Jonathan (1995). The Dutch Republic: Its Rise, Greatness, and Fall 1477–1806. Oxford: Clarendon Press. ISBN 0-19-873072-1.
- Platt, E. (2014). Britain and the Bestandstwisten: The Causes, Course and Consequences of British Involvement in the Dutch Religious and Political Disputes of the Early Seventeenth Century. Vandenhoeck & Ruprecht. ISBN 9783647550770.
- Redactie Historiek. "Scherpe Resolutie (4 augustus 1617)". Historiek (in Dutch).
- J.A. Wijne (1859). "Het stuk der Waardgelders in de provincie Holland, hoofdzakelijk gedurende het ministerie van Johan van Oldenbarnevelt, in De gids: nieuwe vaderlandsche letteroefeningen, July and August". Google Books (in Dutch). pp. 111–149, 232–284.
