= Duyck =

Duyck is a surname. Notable people with the surname include:

- Ann-Sophie Duyck (born 1987), Belgian triathlete
- Anthonie Duyck (c. 1560–1629), Grand Pensionary of Holland
