= Anthonie Duyck =

Grand Pensionary of Holland (1560–1629)

Anthonie Duyck (c. 1560 – 13 September 1629) was Grand Pensionary of Holland between 1621 and 1629.

== Life ==
Anthonie Duyck was a descendant of a notable hollandic family which was founded in the 13th century. Anthonie was the son of Gijsbert Duyck, lord of Oud Karspel, who was appointed schout of Hoorn in 1580. Anthonie was born in The Hague and studied law in Leiden. In 1588, he became advocaat-fiscaal (public prosecutor) at the Raad van State. This was, next to the States-General of the Netherlands, the central constitutional body of the United Provinces. As official of the Raad van State, he accompanied Prince Maurice of Orange on his military campaigns between 1591 and 1602. He wrote long reports about these military campaigns for his superiors in The Hague. In 1602, he became griffier at the court of Holland. In 1619 even a justice in the Hoge Raad van Holland en Zeeland. He was named as one of the public prosecutors against his will for the special court which tried Johan van Oldenbarnevelt. This court pronounced the death penalty in 1619. Duyck became Grand Pensionary of Holland in 1621. His tasks were moderate compared to the tasks of Oldenbarnevelt. Oldenbarnevelt was an important political leader, while Duyck was more an official, and held this office for eight years, but without putting his stamp on it. He turned out to be a rather colorless statesman. During his tenure, Andries Bicker of Amsterdam took over the leadership of the republican-leaning Dutch regents.

Anthonie married twice, and his first wife, Elisabeth de Michely, gave him three children, all daughters.

== Works ==
From 1591 to 1602, Anthonie kept a journal, detailing his activities and events of the Eighty Years' War, in which the Dutch Republic was embroiled at that time. This journal was edited and published by the Dutch department of war in 1862, though of the seven books, one, book four, was lost.

== Notes ==
Political offices
Preceded by Andries de Witt	Grand Pensionary of Holland; 1621–1629	Succeeded by Jacob Cats
