= Hoge Raad van Holland en Zeeland =

Dutch judicial body

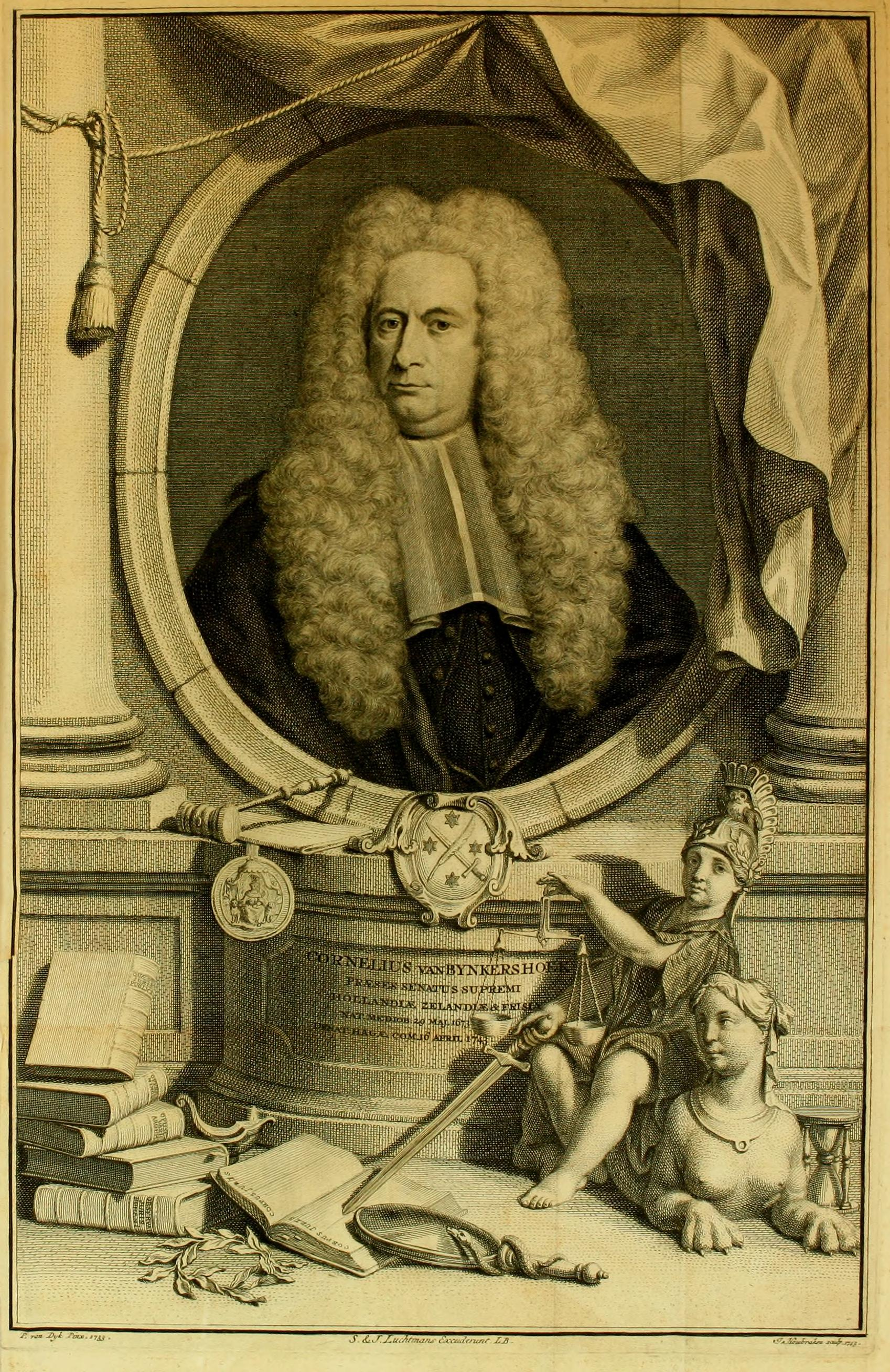
Cornelius van Bynkershoek, President of the Hoge Raad van Holland en Zeeland, 1724-1743

The Hoge Raad van Holland, Zeeland en West-Friesland (Note: Formally, the name of the province of Holland in the period under consideration was "Holland and West-Friesland" for historical reasons, but the latter part is usually dropped in the literature if it is not relevant for the subject under discussion.) (Dutch pronunciation: [ˌɦoːɣə ˈraːt fɑn ˈɦɔlɑnt ˈseːlɑnt ɛɱ ʋɛst ˈfrislɑnt]; (Note: In isolation, van, Zeeland and en are pronounced [vɑn], [ˈzeːlɑnt] and [ɛn], respectively.) usually translated in the literature as "High Court of Holland and Zeeland", though the literal translation is: "High Council of Holland and Zeeland") was the apex court of the provinces of Holland and Zeeland in the Dutch Republic in the period 1582–1795. Created by the States-General, the court was initially intended to serve as apex court for the whole Republic, but the other provinces did not recognise it, preferring to maintain their judicial autonomy. It played an important role in the formation of Roman-Dutch law, which is still officially regarded as a source of law in South Africa. Later, at the establishment of the United Kingdom of the Netherlands, the court's name was borrowed for the Hoge Raad der Nederlanden (Supreme Court of the Netherlands), which still bears that name today as the Dutch apex court.

== History ==
The Great Council of Mechelen was the final Court of Appeal in the Habsburg Netherlands for all provincial High Courts. When, however, the rebellious provinces of Holland and Zeeland became physically separated from this court due to the difficulties for travellers during the military campaigns of the early Eighty Years' War after 1572, the practical lack of a possibility of appeal from sentences of the Hof van Holland (the provincial High Court for both provinces since 1428) was felt as a serious problem. This could only be solved after the Act of Abjuration of 1581 had formalised the deposition of the overlord of the Netherlands, Philip II of Spain. The States-General of the Netherlands decided to replace the Great Council in the provinces of the Union of Utrecht with its own "supra-provincial' court in 1582. But only the States of Holland accepted for the time being such a supreme court, which meant that its jurisdiction remained limited to that province. Only in 1587 did the States of Zeeland accede to the Supreme Court. No other provinces joined them. The court was dissolved together with the other institutions of the Dutch Republic after the Batavian Republic overthrew the old Republic in 1795.

== The Instruction of 1582 ==
The Instructie that the States-General drew up, promulgated on 31 May 1582 by William the Silent, to regulate the Supreme Court was in large part based on the Ordonnance of 1559 that governed the Great Council. This text, comprising 289 articles, would essentially remain in force during the entire history of the Court. The first 50 articles describe the jurisdiction and competence, composition and internal procedures of the court. Then follow the articles governing the work of the procureur-generaal (sollicitor-general) and advocaat-fiscaal (attorney-general) (art. LI-LXIII). Next follow articles regarding the griffier (Clerk of court) and secretaries (art. LXIV-XCIII). Then follow rules governing the competence and procedure of the court (XCIV-CIV), directly followed by rules about the way the bailiffs would execute the decrees of the court (CV-CXX). Then follow rules about the division of work between procureurs (sollicitors) and advocaten (attorneys, barristers), and the tariff for their services (CXXI-CLXVI), followed by rules about the procedures during trials (CLXVII-CXC). And finally details about the different legal remedies to be sought before the court were given (CXCI-CLXXXXIX).

== Jurisdiction and competence ==
The organisation of the Judiciary that the Dutch Republic inherited from the Habsburg Netherlands was a patchwork of city and feudal courts on a local level, applying local law, like Schepenbanken, Baljuw's courts, and Heerlijkheid's courts that acted as courts of first instance in both criminal and civil cases. In general, appeal from criminal verdicts was not possible, so that the Appellate courts only took appeals of civil cases. The provincial High Court (the Hof van Holland) took these appeals, but also acted as court of first instance in a number of cases. The Supreme Court of Holland and Zeeland provided a possibility of (higher) appeal from cases decided in the provincial high court and the courts of the Hoogheemraadschappen (which handled certain land-use cases). It also had original jurisdiction in certain cases, e.g. commercial cases involving foreign merchants (and foreign law). Cases of Reversal (i.e. in which a final verdict was reviewed and possibly overturned) were reserved for the States-General which as Hoge Overheid or sovereign power in the Republic was the ultimate fount of justice (the States-General exceptionally also took politically sensitive cases, like the trial of Johan van Oldenbarnevelt and Hugo Grotius in 1618 and the trial of the Amboyna judges).

In appeals cases the Supreme Court generally had three remedies available: direct appeal from a decree of a lower court (comparable to a writ of Certiorari), and judicial review of an entire case (comparable to a petition for a writ of Mandamus), both in cases decided by the judiciary, and by an arbiter. In cases of original jurisdiction (which were ipso facto also cases of final jurisdiction) the court had all the usual legal remedies available. The court had also single jurisdiction over petitions for rechterlijke middelen van herstel en gunst, a number of legal remedies that had been executed by the Hoge Overheid (Sovereign) under his powers of Grace and Pardon but now fell to the courts. An example are acts of cession by debtors. In these cases the Supreme Court usually committed the case to a lower court for disposal. Finally, the Supreme Court acted in cases of voluntary adjudication of Public instruments (in Dutch: Authentieke akten).

== Composition ==
The Supreme Court in 1582 had nine raadsheren (councillors, justices) and a president-raadsheer (president-councillor) all from Holland. When Zeeland joined the court in 1587 that province got 2 of the 9 councillors. In 1596 the number of councillors was increased to 10 and Zeeland got 3 councillors. This remained the composition of the court till 1795.

The griffier and his deputy were the main administrative support of the court. The court further had two "first bailiffs" or deurwaarders to maintain order in the court and to execute its writs within the city of The Hague. The ontvanger der exploiten (receiver of fees) collected the fees and fines and made payments for the court. These were the offices in the court that were filled by the Stadtholder (for life, in the case of the councillors) on the nomination of the States of the two provinces. (During the First Stadtholderless Period and the Second Stadtholderless Period, when the office of stadtholder was left vacant, the provincial States filled vacancies.) The court further had a modest administrative staff that in case of need was augmented with servants of the Hof van Holland, which also resided in The Hague, next door in the Binnenhof.

Two councillors held the weekly audience in which petitioners and lawyers presented documents for the cases the court heard. Generally one councillor was charged by the president to hear the case as a judge-commissioner in evidentiary hearings, called the enqueste, while another councillor (rapporteur) reported the case to the full court for its deliberations (a quorum of seven councillors was required for a valid deliberation). Individual councillors informally acted as mediators between parties to promote settlements (which could be reached at any stage of a case before the final verdict).

The procureurs and advocaten were officers of the court, but acted for individual clients. They also appeared before the Hof van Holland. The procureur-generaal and the advocaat-fiscaal were officials appointed by the stadtholder to advise the court (and sometimes to take part in the deliberations of the court if otherwise a quorum could not be reached due to illness of a councillor), but mainly to represent the state in cases before the court.

=== Presidents ===
- Treslong, Johan van (18-01-1582 - 05-06-1583)
- Nicolai, Aarnout (22-10-1583 - 22-01-1592)
- Egmond van de Nijenburg, Dirk van (11-05-1592 - 07-01-1597)
- Banchem, Johan van (01-02-1599 - 29-11-1601)
- Brederode, Reinoud van (18-03-1602 - 07-01-1633)
- Haga, Cornelis (17-06-1645 - 12-08-1654)
- Pauw, Reynier (14-05-1655 - 20-01-1676)
- Fagel, François (24-05-1677 - 12-11-1680)
- Druyff, Hendrik (02-04-1681 - 18-11-1690)
- Rooseboom, Hubertus (03-03-1691 - 04-10-1722)
- Admiraal, Simon (23-03-1723 - 02-03-1724)
- Bijnkershoek, Cornelis van (26-05-1724 - 16-04-1743)
- Hees, Hendrik van (20-06-1743 - 04-08-1754)
- Grande, Adriaan de (14-11-1754 - 09-08-1763)
- Mollerus, Hendrik (29-10-1763 - 08-12-1783)
- Pauw, Willem (19-03-1784 - 24-06-1787)
- Mauregnault, Johan Boreel de (02-11-1787 - 1795)

=== Councillors ===
- Amstel van Mijnden tot Cronenburgh, Amelis van (1582 - 1592)
- Oem van Wijngaerden, Gerard (18-01-1582 - 1591)
- Foreest, Nanning van (18-01-1582 - 1592)
- Hogendorp, Gijsbert van (18-01-1582 - 01–1584)
- Egmond van de Nijenburg, Dirk van (18-01-1582 - 10-05-1592)
- Loosen, Sebastiaan van (18-01-1582 - 24-04-1597)
- Banchem, Johan van (18-01-1582 - 30-01-1599)
- Mortagne, Geraart van (18-01-1582 - 03–1583)
- Beets, Johan (09-06-1582 - 07–1583)
- Wensen, Adriaan (24-10-1583 - 1587)
- Nieuwstad, Cornelis Mathiasz. van der (23-02-1584 - 25-06-1606)
- Valcke, Jacob (05-1589 - )
- Hermansz., Frederik (06-07-1589 - 11–1593)
- Leyden van Leeuwen, Dirc Adriaensz. van (30-09-1591 - 21-04-1596)
- Does, Johan van der (30-09-1591 - 08-10-1604)
- Vranck, Franchois (11-05-1592 - 11-10-1617)
- Bouchorst, Amelis van den (24-06-1593 - 1602)
- Voogt, Leonart (04-01-1594 - 09-06-1613)
- Hoogerbeets, Rombout (21-05-1596 - 22-12-1617)
- Hermansz., Frederik (15-01-1597 - )
- Hinojossa, Pieter de (15-01-1597 - 16-05-1607)
- Brederode, Reinoud van (16-05-1597 - 17-03-1602)
- Santen, Johan van (17-11-1603 - 26-10-1609)
- Honert, Rochus van den (17-11-1603 - 30-01-1638)
- Veen, Simon van (20-03-1607 - 26-10-1610)
- Vosbergen, Caspar van (09-10-1608 - 13-03-1626)
- Scotte, Apollonius (09-10-1608 - 01-11-1639)
- Veer, Albert de (26-05-1611 - 08-02-1620)
- Asperen, Paulus van (02-01-1613 - 13-05-1641)
- Ruychaver, Nicolaas (28-01-1614 - 14-07-1620)
- Duyck, Anthony (04-10-1619 - 09-02-1621)
- Fagel, François (06-10-1619 - 02-03-1644)
- Pauw, Reynier (26-01-1621 - 13-05-1655)
- Coren, Jacob Gerritsz. (17-04-1621 - 24-10-1631)
- Casembroot, Jan Leonart de (21-12-1621 - 04-11-1637)
- Reygersberge, Nicolaas van (04-11-1625 - 03-08-1654)
- Jonge, Cornelis de (10-11-1626 - 13-08-1649)
- Waal, Anthonis de (30-01-1634 - 14-09-1658)
- Opmeer, Pieter (06-08-1638 - 22-12-1639)
- Foreest, Jan van (06-08-1638 - 27-10-1651)
- Doublet, George (27-04-1640 - 30-04-1655)
- Oudensteyn, Matthijs van (24-04-1642 - 18-01-1647)
- Heemskerck, Jan van (17-06-1645 - 27-02-1656)
- Schotte, Jacob (02-08-1645 - 27-02-1670)
- Riccen, Frederik (27-03-1649 - 29-09-1652)
- Pieterson, Cornelis (30-11-1651 - 25-05-1664)
- Bije, Nicolaes de (30-08-1652 - 16-02-1675)
- Born, François van den (18-12-1652 - 08-01-1670)
- Haese, Theodorus de (10-11-1654 - 12-11-1668)
- Riccen, Franco (05-08-1655 - 16-01-1673)
- Moons, Johan (05-08-1655 - 06-03-1669)
- Hudde, Hendrick (03-08-1656 - 31-03-1677)
- Olycan, IJsbrand (19-11-1658 - 09-03-1660)
- Druyff, Hendrik (19-11-1660 - 01-04-1681)
- Nideck, Gijsbert Rudolphi van (15-03-1669 - 06-04-1690)
- Ockers, Pieter (20-09-1669 - 23-09-1678)
- Gruywaart, Hieronymus (20-09-1669 - 12-10-1675)
- Fagel, François (14-03-1670 - 23-05-1677)
- Brande, Johan van den (25-07-1670 - 28-03-1673)
- Witt, Johan de (04-08-1672 - 20-08-1672)
- Kinschot, Roeland van (20-03-1673 - 04-02-1701)
- Borselen van der Hooge, Adriaan van (31-07-1674 - 16-01-1694)
- Hop, Cornelis (27-03-1675 - 05-11-1704)
- Rooseboom, Hubertus (17-07-1677 - 02-03-1691)
- Bronckhorst, Vincent van (31-07-1677 - 04-02-1703)
- Cobmoyer, Adriaen (12-04-1680 - 17-06-1680)
- Ockers, Johan (12-04-1680 - 25-09-1680)
- Citters, Arnout van (17-06-1680 - 13-07-1684)
- Broeck, Willem van den (10-09-1681 - 22-09-1726)
- Pieterson, Cornelis (25-11-1681 - 23-11-1701)
- Huybert, Anthony de (14-07-1684 - 02-12-1702)
- Heym, Anthony Gerritsz. van der (22-08-1690 - 1698)
- Admiraal, Simon (27-03-1691 - 22-03-1723)
- Verbrugge, Rutgert (27-07-1695 - 31-01-1715)
- Vries, Feltrum de (02-08-1698 - 13-08-1723)
- Sluysken, Willem (31-03-1701 - 14-03-1715)
- Schaep, Reinier (16-03-1703 - 02-07-1734)
- Ketelaer, Nicolaas (14-05-1703 - 07-05-1749)
- Bijnkershoek, Cornelis van (23-04-1704 - 25-05-1724)
- Roovere, Pompejus de (21-11-1704 - 24-08-1742)
- Kruysse, Abraham van der (01-04-1715 - 20-04-1716)
- Santheuvel, Diederik van den (19-07-1715 - 08-09-1718)
- Hoop, François van der (13-09-1717 - 17-05-1741)
- Hees, Hendrik van (01-12-1718 - 19-06-1743)
- Visscher, Adolf (28-07-1723 - 23-04-1726)
- Bleyswijk, Johan van (10-09-1723 - 13-03-1748)
- Duurcant, Willem (19-09-1724 - 01-07-1740)
- Does, Johan van der (12-07-1726 - 29-09-1746)
- Grande, Adriaan de (22-11-1726 - 13-11-1754)
- Hop, Johannes (17-09-1734 - 01-02-1748)
- Mollerus, Hendrik (21-11-1740 - 28-10-1763)
- Pauw, Willem (24-11-1741 - 18-03-1784)
- Nispen, Johan van (14-09-1742 - 07-01-1776)
- Santheuvel, Adriaan van den (19-07-1743 - 16-02-1778)
- Dierkens, Willem Hendrik (02-12-1746 - 04-04-1776)
- Ruster, Abraham van (26-03-1748 - 18-03-1754)
- Alewijn, Abraham (26-03-1748 - 09-07-1755)
- Mauregnault, Johan Boreel de (27-04-1750 - 01-11-1787)
- Hoeufft, Pompejus (23-07-1754 - 21-11-1787)
- Hees, Anthony Hendrik van (18-03-1755 - 17-09-1768)
