= Hof van Holland =

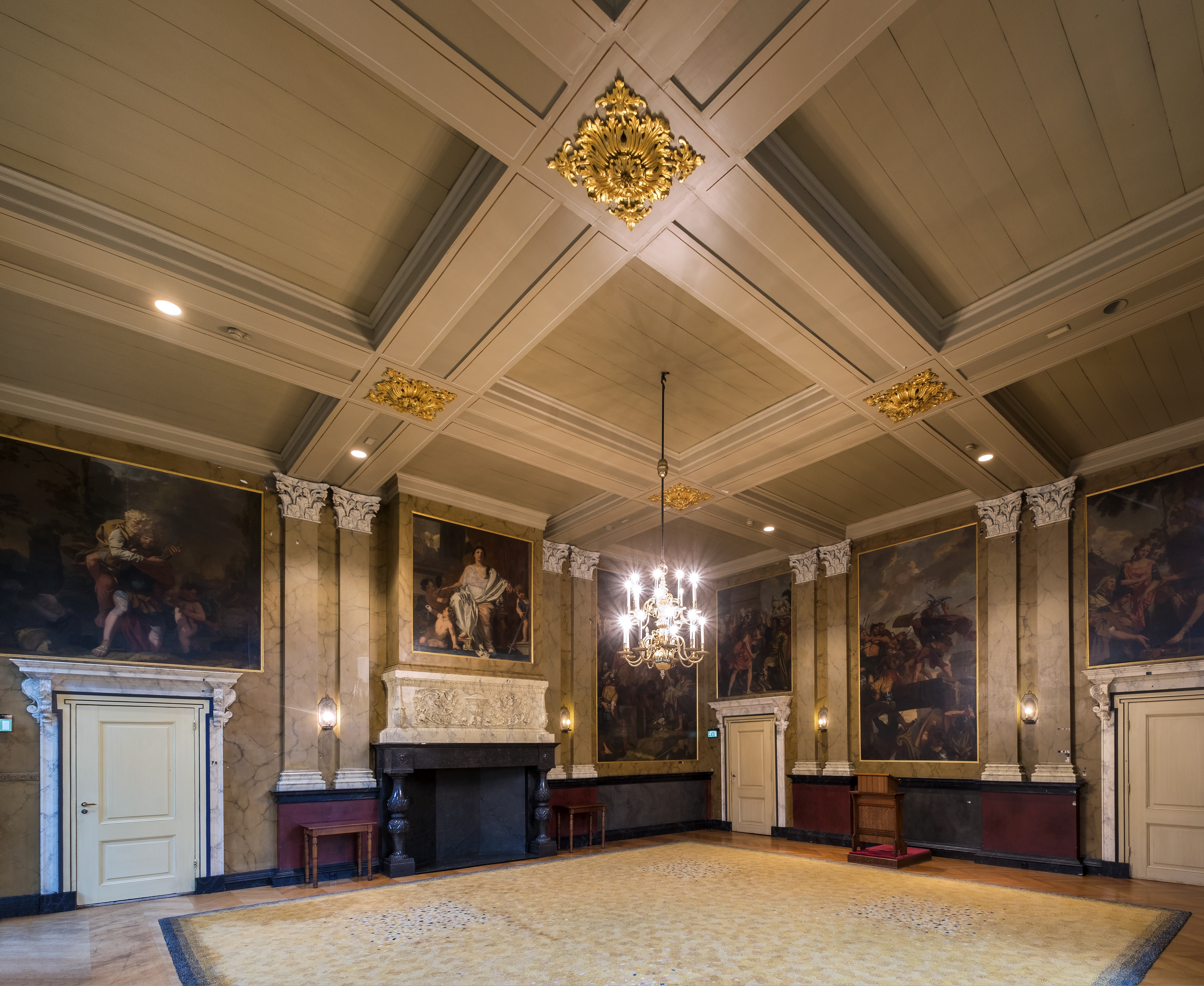
The Lairessezaal at the Binnenhof, which was the council chamber of the Hof van Holland. The paintings by Gerard de Lairesse display an interesting legal iconography.

The Hof van Holland, Zeeland en West-Friesland (Dutch pronunciation: [ˈɦɔ(f) fɑn ˈɦɔlɑnt ˈseːlɑnt ɛɱ ʋɛst ˈfrislɑnt]; (Note: In isolation, van, Zeeland and en are pronounced [vɑn], [ˈzeːlɑnt] and [ɛn], respectively.) usually shortened to Hof van Holland in the literature, and sometimes translated in English literature as "(High) Court of Holland") was an appelate court of the provinces of Holland, West Friesland and Zeeland, instituted as a separate entity of the government of the Counties of Holland and Zeeland in 1428, under the Burgundian and Habsburg Netherlands, and continued with little change under the Dutch Republic, Batavian Republic, and the Kingdom of Holland, until its dissolution in 1811 by the First French Empire. It should not be confused with the Hoge Raad van Holland en Zeeland which was the apex court, founded in 1582 by the States-General of the Netherlands and intended for the entire Dutch Republic (though in practice only recognised by the same provinces, those of Holland and Zeeland). The Hof was in practice the main Appellate court in Holland and Zeeland, and in number of cases-handled the most important in the entire Dutch Republic (in comparison to the sister-provincial courts like the Hof van Friesland) and its Precedents played an important role in the development of Roman-Dutch law, which is still influential in Southern Africa.

== History ==
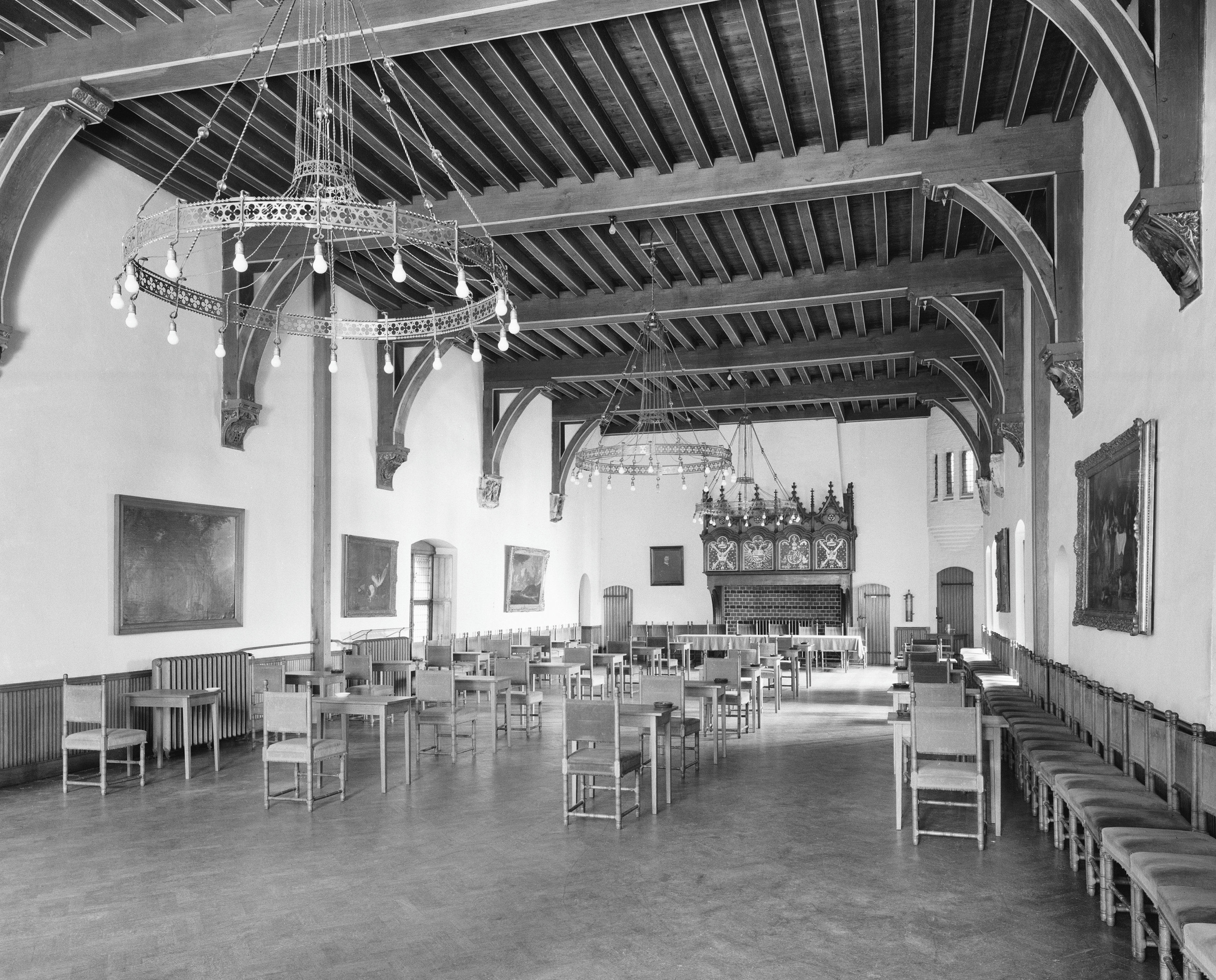
Rolzaal at the Binnenhof, where the Hof van Holland held its audiences.

The Hof was constituted by Duke Philip the Good, in his capacity of new Count of Holland and Zeeland on 3 July 1428 (on the basis of the Treaty of Delft) as his "High Council" to govern the counties, together with his Stadtholder. At first the Council combined executive and judicial functions. In the period around 1445 the judicial tasks were more and more concentrated in a separate "chamber" of nine councillors, which became known as the Hof. This was first formalised by the Instructie (Instruction) of 1462, given by Philip's son Charles of Charolais, that formally governed the jurisdiction, competence and composition of the court. Such Instructions were again drawn up in 1480, 1522 and 1531 (to name the most important dates). The 1531 Instruction remained more or less in force (with small amendments) until the court's dissolution in 1811, despite the fact that after the Act of Abjuration of 1581 (when Philip II of Spain was formally deposed as Count Philip III of Holland and Zeeland) the sovereignty of the count was taken over by the States of the two counties (now sovereign provinces in a confederacy). The Habsburg Netherlands had since the 1470s always had the Great Council of Mechelen as their Supreme Court. This was replaced in 1582 by the Hoge Raad van Holland en Zeeland as the Supreme Court of the Dutch Republic, but in practice only the States of Holland and of Zeeland recognized this highest Appellate Court. This meant that the Hof and the Hoge Raad in practice competed with one another as appellate courts (though formally decisions of the Hof could be appealed to the Hoge Raad) due to a vague delineation of the jurisdictions and competences of the two courts. When in 1795 the Batavian Republic overthrew the old Republic the Hoge Raad was dissolved, but the Hof remained in place, be it that its name was changed in 1798 to Hof van Justitie van Holland en Zeeland (Court of Justice of Holland and Zeeland). With the new constitution of 1801 the province of Zeeland got its own Hof van Justitie (Court of Justice), which was split off from the Holland one in 1803. When the Kingdom of Holland (which had succeeded the Batavian Republic in 1806) was annexed to the French Empire in 1810 all such provincial Courts of Justice were abolished as of January 1, 1811. But the Hof was only dissolved on 1 March 1811 with the inauguration of the new Imperial Court for the Departements that took the place of the province of Holland.

== Jurisdiction and Competence ==
=== Original Jurisdiction ===
In the Instructions that were drawn up since 1462 the jurisdiction of the court as a tribunal of first instance was defined according to people who fell under its jurisdiction (ratione personae) and subject matters (ratione materiae) under its jurisdiction. In the category of people fell privileged persons like noblemen, Church officials and government officials, and "defenseless" people like women, clergymen, and widows and orphans, who deserved the special protection of the Count. Furthermore, foreigners without a fixed abode in Holland fell into this category. As to subject matter for the original jurisdiction of the court: all matters of concern to the Count, like his feudal Fees and domains, his rights (like Mint and High justice), and offices in his gift (read for "Count" after 1572 the States of Holland and Zeeland, who had already de facto taken over his sovereignty). Furthermore, important land-use cases, and conflicts between local governments fell under its jurisdiction, as did legal actions in connection with Possession (as opposed to Property actions). The last category was transferred to the original jurisdiction of the Hoge Raad after 1582, as was the original jurisdiction over cases of maritime law, and the grant of middelen van herstel en gunst (certain legal actions like e.g. the Cession of property by a debtor to his creditor). Unfortunately, when the Hoge Raad received its Instruction from the States-General in 1582 the Instruction of the Hof was not changed at the same time to reflect the transfer of competences in these respects. The Hof therefore continued hearing cases that formally belonged to the Hoge Raad which caused some competition between the two courts. Only in 1660 did the States of Holland resolve that in possession cases each court had to inform the other of such cases to make some coordination possible.

==== Procedure in first instance ====
The procedure in most cases was the so-called rolprocedure (after the rol (roll of paper or parchment) on which the particulars of the cases were entered during the rolzitting (audience), which took place weekly on Monday before two councillors, taking turns, in the Rolzaal of the Binnenhof at The Hague where the Hof sat since 1511). A case was initiated by a petition for a mandement van dagvaarding (writ of civil summons) by an impetrant (plaintiff). This was executed by a deurwaarder (bailiff) to summon the gedaagde (defendant) to appear on a specific date at the audience, where the sollicitor of the plaintiff handed over a conclusie van eis (comparable to a complaint) as the first pleading. These were followed by further written pleadings: conclusie van antwoord (counter-plea), conclusie van repliek (reply), and conclusie van dupliek (rejoinder) on successive audiences. These four pleadings could be augmented by other documents of all kinds after special petitions (rekest civiel) from the parties had obtained leave to do this. At a certain point there were no more documents to exchange and parties would enter a final pleidooi (closing argument) and ask for justice in a conclusie in rechte. If the parties contradicted each other on the facts the court could order an enqueste (evidentiary hearing) before a commissaris (one of the councillors appointed as commissioner). In such a hearing the parties and witnesses would be interrogated under oath. Finally, the case would be summed up in the rapport by another councillor, the rapporteur, for the full court to deliberate. The court decided by majority vote. Minority opinions were not published. In case the vote was a draw the complaint was rejected. The final verdict (dictum) was read at an audience (not before all fees were paid) and the written verdict with the opinion on which it was based were handed to the triumfant party.

Besides the rolprocedure the Hof also used a number of special procedures, like the summary procedure (conducted before commissioners) and the communicatoire procedure (which was completely conducted in writing).

=== Criminal Jurisdiction ===
Though most criminal cases were handled by lower courts that had the privilege of high or low justice, the Hof had original jurisdiction over cases that fell into the Count's own high justice, like offenses against the state (treason, sedition, insurrection) under the Roman-law doctrine of laesa maiestas (Heresy, though originally an offense under canon law, tried by the Inquisition, was brought under this doctrine by count Philip III, so the Hof also was competent in such cases). Furthermore, the Hof would try capital cases of felonies, like murder, manslaughter, rape and piracy (though the latter would become a matter for admiralty courts after admiralty boards were formed in the 1590s), and offenses against the count's rights like poaching on his domains and counterfeiting. All such cases were handled in extra-ordinaris procedure (i.e. unlike the ordinaris procedure, followed in civil cases described above). This procedure was derived from Roman law. This implied that the procedure (mostly of the cognitio-extra-ordinem variety) had a more inquisitorial than adversarial character. The defendant had no right to representation and formal defense. Because Roman law required either the testimony of two witnesses or a confession of the suspect to obtain a conviction, torture was allowed if the magistrate was convinced of the guilt of the suspect, who refused to confess. Of a verdict in an extra-ordinaris procedure formally no appeal was possible, though in practice officers of the court could appeal if they thought the verdict unsafe. But the Hof also was competent in lesser cases like misdemeanors which could result in fines. Such cases were usually handled like civil (ordinaris) cases. In such criminal cases appeal was possible.

=== Appeal ===
In cases where the Hof did not have original jurisdiction (i.e. in the vast majority of cases), people had to apply for justice to all kinds of local jurisdictions like e.g. city schepenbanken or vierscharen, baljuw (a county official) courts, and Heerlijkheid courts (courts of feudal lords with the privilege of high or low justice). Indeed, first jurisdiction by a local court was felt as an important privilege: the Jus de non evocando. Originally, no appeal was possible from verdicts of such courts, even in ordinaris procedures. But this soon caused resistance from losing parties, especially in cases of severe misconduct of the court. The resistance took the form of protests to county officials, called valsschelden van vonnissen, or faussement de jugement (appeal to falsity of the verdict), on the ground that the judges had been corrupt, the law had been misinterpreted, or there had been mistakes in the procedure. Such appeals were formally lodged by county officials (in the interest of the law) and could result in a quashing of the verdict and a fine for the offending judge.

Another important precursor of appeal was the procedure known as te hoofde gaan (literally: "go to the head") by lower courts. This was a request by the lower court itself for a preliminary ruling by a higher court in a matter in which the lower court was unsure of the correct interpretation of the law. In this case the higher court need not be the Hof, but could be a hierarchically higher court, like a baljuw court.

Such precursors evolved into a formal privilege of appeal to higher courts from verdicts of lower courts and eventually to the Hof and the Great Council (before 1582) and the Hoge Raad (after 1582) with a special procedure. The development was different in Zeeland where people at first had a provincial appellate court in the form of the Hoge Vierschaar. As this court could only be convened by the Count himself, or his eldest son, and had to be presided over by the Count himself, this court only sat infrequently. The people from Zeeland in practice therefore had the ineluctable choice of appealing to the "Holland" Hof, or going directly to the "Great Council" (appeal omisso medio).

The appeals procedure offered three remedies: appel, reformatie and reductie (the latter was reformatie of an arbitration award). Appel (comparable to interlocutory appeal) was an immediate review, even before the final verdict, from any kind of decree of a lower court. Such an appel had to be lodged within a short period after the decree was taken (usually forty days) and suspended the decree. Reformatie reviewed a case in which a final verdict by a lower court had been pronounced. It did not suspend that verdict (except in cases where the execution would do irreparable harm) and had to be lodged within a year of the final verdict in question. In a number of cases an appeal bypassing the Hof directly to the "Great Council" or Hoge Raad (i.e. an appeal omisso medio) was expressly prohibited.

==== Appeals procedure ====
To start an appeals procedure the appellant had to petition the Hof for a mandement van appel (writ of appeal, comparable to a writ of Certiorari) and to give a bond (in case the appel would be rejected and a boete van fol appel or "fine for false appeal" had to be paid). In case of reformatie no bond need be given.

The procedure was in large respect the same as the rolprocedure in first instance, except for the following differences: firstly, not only the other party was summoned, but also the judges who had made the decree or verdict of which appeal (the reason for this was that the judges could be asked to explain their reasoning). The latter were called geintihimeerden, but this term was often also (incorrectly) used for the opposing party.

Secondly, in most cases the appeals procedure before the Hof was based on the documents produced in the case before the lower court. Parties could, however, request to include new material. Only in case there had been an evidentiary hearing in the lower case the Hof also conducted a completely new trial.

=== Extrajudicial procedures and voluntary adjudication ===
Not all procedures before the Hof had an adversarial character. The Hof could act as arbiter in cases of voluntary arbitration at the request of parties. Also, in a number of cases there was just one party, without an adversary, who needed a particular judicial or executive action performed. Examples of the latter were the conveyancing of titles of real estate, both voluntary (in case of sale) and involuntary (in case of foreclosure). The Hof acted then as Notary. Another example was the remissiebrief of people who had received a pardon in criminal cases. This remissiebrief was the certificate stating the pardon and this had to be endorsed (interineerd) by the Hof (after a procedure in which the validity of the pardon was tested, and the victims in the crime were asked if they had been adequately indemnified by the pardoned criminal).

== Composition ==
The Hof was constituted on 3 July 1428 with 9 raadsheren (councillors, justices). In this number was the governor (since 1448 the stadtholder) included. Usually the stadtholder presided over the Hof, except in the periods 1445–1448, 1474–1477, and 1510–1572, when a president-raadsheer presided. After 1572 (when the members of the Hof briefly fled to Utrecht, because of the start of the Dutch Revolt), the Prince of Orange as rebel-stadtholder formally took over the chairmanship. After 1578 the stadtholder was no longer a member of the Hof and the Hof was again presided over by a president-raadsheer. After 1578 the total number of members of the court was 12: three for Zeeland (for the cities of Middelburg, Veere and Vlissingen) and eight (plus the president) for Holland (of which two for the ridderschap). The members of the court were appointed for life by first the Count, and after 1572 by the States of Holland and of Zeeland. After 1747 the stadtholder appointed the members for Zeeland, on the nomination of three nominees by the States of Zeeland. Other officers of the court were the griffier (Court clerk) and his deputy; the ontvanger van de exploiten (receiver of fees and fines; between 1463 and 1469; after 1490 ontvanger epargnes) and a varying number of secretaries, at maximum ten, later six, and after 1724 three. Attached to the court were an advocaat-fiscaal (attorney-general; since 1463 and till 1623; after 1641 office split into advocaat-fiscaal crimineel and advocaat-fiscaal civiel), and a procureur-generaal (sollicitor-general; in 1623 office merged with that of advocaat-fiscaal), who acted in civil cases for the state and as public prosecutor in criminal cases.

=== Presidents ===
- Wilde, Gosewijn de (17-04-1445 - 17-06-1448)
- Halewijn, Jan van (17-06-1474 - 15-01-1477)
- Everaerts, Nicolaas (31-07-1510 - 22-09-1528)
- Assendelft, Gerrit van (09-10-1528 - 07-12-1558)
- Suys, Cornelis (07-10-1559 - 1572)
- Nicolai, Aarnout (20-06-1578 - 21-10-1583)
- Mijle, Adriaan Arentsz. van der (19-12-1583 - 16-07-1590)
- Oem van Wijngaerden, Gerard (06-04-1591 - 06-05-1598)
- Hinojossa, Pieter de (26-05-1607 - 04-05-1616)
- Cromhout, Nicolaes (01-01-1620 - 23-03-1641)
- Oem van Wijngaerden, Johan (02-05-1642 - 19-12-1652)
- Dedel, Johan (28-10-1653 - 22-03-1665)
- Pauw, Adriaen (21-07-1670 - 12-01-1697)
- Sluysken, Frederick (22-05-1697 - 11-10-1710)
- Hinojossa, Adriaen Pieter (18-09-1713 - 28-12-1741)
- Mauregnault, Johan de (09-10-1742 - 28-12-1757)
- Mieden, Adriaen van der (05-05-1758 - 13-11-1764)
- Slicher, Wigbold (04-01-1765 - 24-10-1790)
- Wilhem, Coenraad le Leu de (28-12-1790 - 12-02-1795)
- Baelde, Rudolf (21-07-1795 - 28-02-1811)
