= Jus de non evocando =

Right to be tried by a competent court

Jus de non evocando is an ancient feudal right stating that no one can be kept from the competent court. It derives from a medieval principle that subjects of the Crown were entitled to ius de non evocando, the right to enjoy the jurisdiction and the protection of the Crown to which they were loyal. As such, it is still present in several constitutions, such as the German constitution, the Italian constitution and the Dutch constitution.

It has today become an important concept in public international law by which states refuse to extradite their own citizens. Some countries may refuse to extradite non-nationals, who because of their crimes may be subject to the death penalty. That may be seen in the case of Canada and Mexico towards the United States.

The principle is frequently argued in cases of the International Criminal Tribunal for Rwanda (ICTR) and the International Criminal Tribunal for the Former Yugoslavia (ICTY). The foundation lies in that the international tribunal, by seizing jurisdiction over an international criminal trial from national courts, violates the principle of jus de non evocando. The Trial Chamber, in the case of Dusko Tadic (IT-94-1 of the ICTY), stated that states give up some measure of sovereignty to be a part of the UN, which produced the ICTY, and so there is no violation.
