= Cornelis van der Mijle =

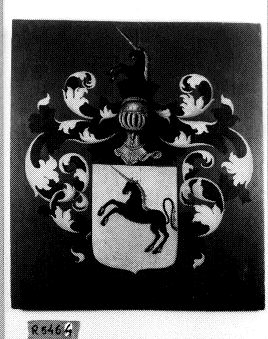
Crest of Cornelis van der Mijle

Cornelis van der Mijle (The Hague 1578 or 1579? (Note: Vander Aa says 1578, Bartelds 1579) — November 1642) was a Dutch politician and diplomat in the service of the Dutch Republic and a regent of Leiden University. He was the son-in-law of Johan van Oldenbarnevelt.

== Biography ==
Cornelis was the son of Adriaan van der Mijle, ambachtsheer of Bleskensgraaf and Dubbeldam, and counselor of William the Silent, and Magdalena van Egmond. After the death of his father his mother sent him to his uncle and namesake in Leiden where he first studied at a Latin school and enrolled next at Leiden University as a student in the Classics on 16 May 1591. He studied under Justus Lipsius and Joseph Justus Scaliger, Paulus Merula, Bonaventura Vulcanius, Julius van Beyma and Franciscus Junius (the elder). Among his study friends were Hugo Grotius, Petrus Scriverius and Daniel Heinsius. He also got into contact with Louise de Coligny, the widow of William the Silent and her son Frederick Henry, Prince of Orange, the future stadtholder, who was also a student in Leiden at the time. (Note: The princess wrote Coelum non solum in Cornelis liber amicorum; Cf. Bartelds, p. 1193) After completing his studies Cornelis made the Grand Tour of Europe, as was usual for young men of his aristocratic station at the time, and he visited France, Germany and Italy, and was enrolled in the university of the Republic of Geneva from 25 May 1597.

After his return van der Mijle married Maria Johanna van Oldenbarnevelt, daughter of Land's Advocate of Holland Johan van Oldenbarnevelt and Maria van Utrecht in 1603. They were married by Johannes Wtenbogaert, the future leader of the Remonstrants. They would have six children: Adriaan, Jan and Cornelia (both died early), Arnold, Magdalena (who would marry Charles de Loges, captain in the guards of the Dutch States Army), and Geertruida.

Van der Mijle was made a counselor of the stadtholder Maurice, Prince of Orange in 1603 and the States of Holland and West Friesland appointed him as a member of the board of regents of Leiden University in the same year. As regent he was soon embroiled in the controversy between the theologians Jacobus Arminius and Franciscus Gomarus, who taught at the university. After the death of Arminius in 1609 the regents had to find a successor. They first decided on Conrad Vorstius, but this met with so much opposition, that this appointment was never realized. Eventually, through the intermediation of van der Mijle, both Johannes Polyander (who succeeded Gomarus) and Simon Episcopius (who succeeded Arminius) were appointed.

Oldenbarnevelt functioned as mentor for van der Mijle in the art of diplomacy. He was made part of the delegation that negotiated the Twelve Years' Truce in 1608. After the Truce came in force he was sent to the Republic of Venice as a special envoy to try and establish diplomatic relations with that sister-republic, at the suggestion of the Venetian ambassador in France, Antonio Foscarini. On the way to Venice he spoke with king Henri IV of France, who was very much in favor of an alliance between the two republics, France and England. Henri at this occasion bestowed a knighthood on van der Mijle. The Doge and Senate of Venice did not agree to a formal alliance, but agreed to send Tomaso Contarini as ambassador to the Dutch Republic. In Venice van der Mijle also became acquainted with Paolo Sarpi and Domenico Molino, who would remain friends with whom he kept up a correspondence in later years.

Soon after his return in The Hague in 1610 van der Mijle was (at the suggestion of the Dutch ambassador in France, Francis van Aarssens) again sought out for a diplomatic mission, this time to France, in connection with the looming crisis of the War of the Jülich Succession. This was again a success, even though just before his arrival in Paris king Henri was assassinated. But van der Mijle managed to convince the regent, Queen Marie de' Medici to continue the alliance with the Republic.

The Queen-regent was not enamored of the Dutch ambassador Aarssens and demanded his recall. This was finally forced by the French ambassador Benjamin Aubery du Maurier, after which Oldenbarnevelt appointed Gideon van Boetzelaer as his successor. That gentleman was not an experienced diplomat, so van der Mijle was sent as an envoy extraordinary to support him at the court of the new king Louis XIII in 1614. He negotiated a draft treaty with the Venetian representative Christofforo Suriano in The Hague.

After the death of his cousin Heyman van der Mijle, from whom he inherited the ambachtsheerlijkheid De Myle and St. Anthonispolder, van de Mijle was made a member of the Holland ridderschap (college of Nobles, part of the States of Holland) in July 1613, followed by his appointment as a member of the Council of State in 1614. In this period the Bestandstwisten (Truce Quarrels) reached a crescendo and van der Mijle became embroiled in a pamphlet war with Aarssens, who had become a mortal enemy of his father-in-law, Oldenbarnevelt, and attacked both with mostly anonymous polemics. The two gentlemen denounced each other before the States General of the Netherlands in the summer of 1618, prompting the States General to appoint a commission of inquiry.

But then Oldenbarnevelt was arrested by stadtholder Maurice on 29 August 1618, together with Grotius and Rombout Hogerbeets, leading to the Trial of Oldenbarnevelt, Grotius and Hogerbeets. Van der Mijle first tried to get Oldenbarnevelt released together with his brother-in-law Reinoud van Brederode, president of the Hoge Raad van Holland en Zeeland, but he felt soon so threatened that he fled to France. This made him suspect in the eyes of the new regime and he was successively driven from all of his offices (the Council of State, the ridderschap and the board of regents of Leiden University). He was not arrested, but given a kind of house arrest, first in Goeree and later in Beverwijk. He was erroneously suspected of implication in the conspiracy of the sons of Oldenbarnevelt against Maurice in 1623, for which Reinier van Oldenbarnevelt was beheaded. But he was finally rehabilitated after the death of Maurice and the appointment of Frederick Henry as his successor.

On 7 April 1632 he and his brother-in-law Brederode were again allowed to take their places in the ridderschap of Holland. He was also reinstated as regent of Leiden University on 17 April 1640.

Van der Mijle died in November 1642. His eulogy was read by Marcus Zuerius van Boxhorn at Leiden University. He was buried in the Hofkapel at the Binnenhof in The Hague.

== Sources ==
- Aa, A.J. van der (1869). "Cornelis van der Myle, in: Biographisch Woordenboek der Nederlanden, Deel 12, tweede stuk". Digitale Bibliotheek der Nederlandse Letteren (in Dutch). pp. 1213–1217.
- Bartelds (1930). Blok, P.J. and P.C. Molhuysen (ed.). "Myle, Cornelis van der, in: Nieuw Nederlandsch Biografisch Woordenboek, Deel 8". Digitale Bibliotheek der Nederlandse Letteren (in Dutch). pp. 1192–1198.
