= Claes Michielsz Bontenbal =

Dutch civil servant (1575–1623)

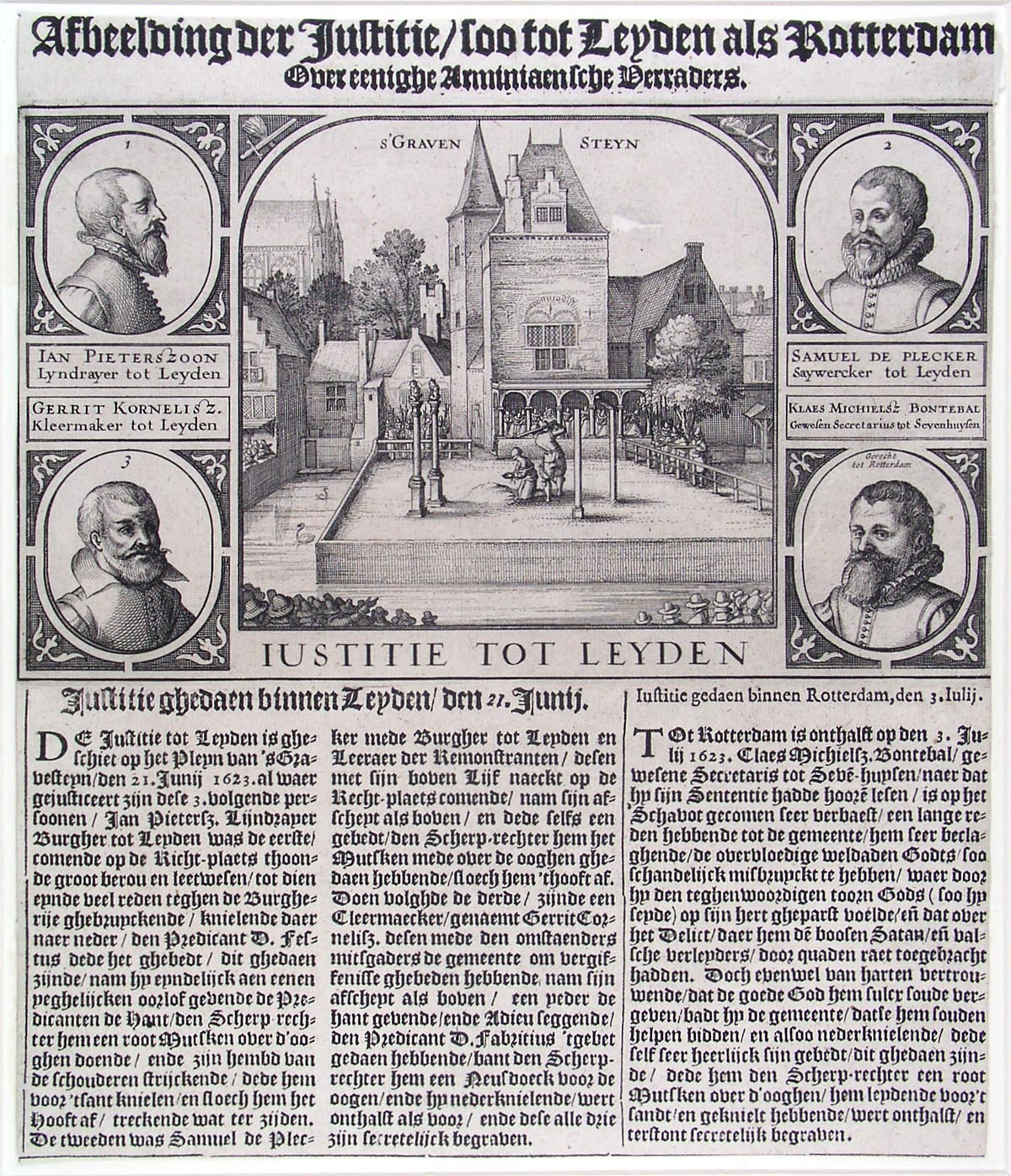
Contemporary print about the execution of Claes Michielsz Bontenbal at Rotterdam, and three other conspirators at Leiden

Claes Michielsz Bontenbal (1575 – 3 July 1623), also known as Klaas Bontebal, was secretary of Zevenhuizen. He was involved in a conspiracy against Maurice of Orange and was beheaded for his part in the conspiracy.

== The conspiracy ==
In 1622, several remonstrants, including the sons of Johan van Oldenbarnevelt, Reinier and Willem, conspired to assassinate Prince Maurice of Orange. They were planning to hire a number of sailors to murder the prince during his trip from The Hague to Rijswijk to visit Margaretha van Mechelen. To hire these people and to procure the necessary weapons, they had to raise a sum of 6,000 guilders. Claes Michielsz Bontenbal, who was a remonstrant himself, was willing to provide a third of this amount.

A total of ten people were hired for the attack. The last four of those hired, however, betrayed the conspiracy to the government. Most of the conspirators were arrested, but a few, including Willem van Oldenbarnevelt, managed to escape. Bontenbal was imprisoned in Rotterdam for eighteen weeks, but, despite being tortured, continued to deny that he was actively involved in the conspiracy. He did admit to having known of the conspiracy, and having loaned the money used to hire the sailors. He was eventually sentenced to death. On the eve of his execution, he gave a full confession.

On 3 July 1623, at around noon in Rotterdam, Bontenbal was led to the scaffold behind the council-hall, and was executed there at the age of 47 or 48 years old. He left a wife and four children.

Hugo de Groot was not aware of these developments in the Dutch republic because of his residence in Paris. On 12 July 1623, he wrote a letter to his brother, Willem de Groot, in which he asked his brother about the fate of Claes Michielsz Bontenbal.

== Sources ==
- Claes Michielszoon Bontenbal, in Verleden Tijdschrift 1993, published by the Oudheidkamer van Zevenhuizen, author P.J. Bontenbal, number 33, page 24-31
- 500 jaar Bontenbal, by P.J. Lestrade and T. Lestrade-Aarts, 1995
