= Hendrick Danielsz Slatius =

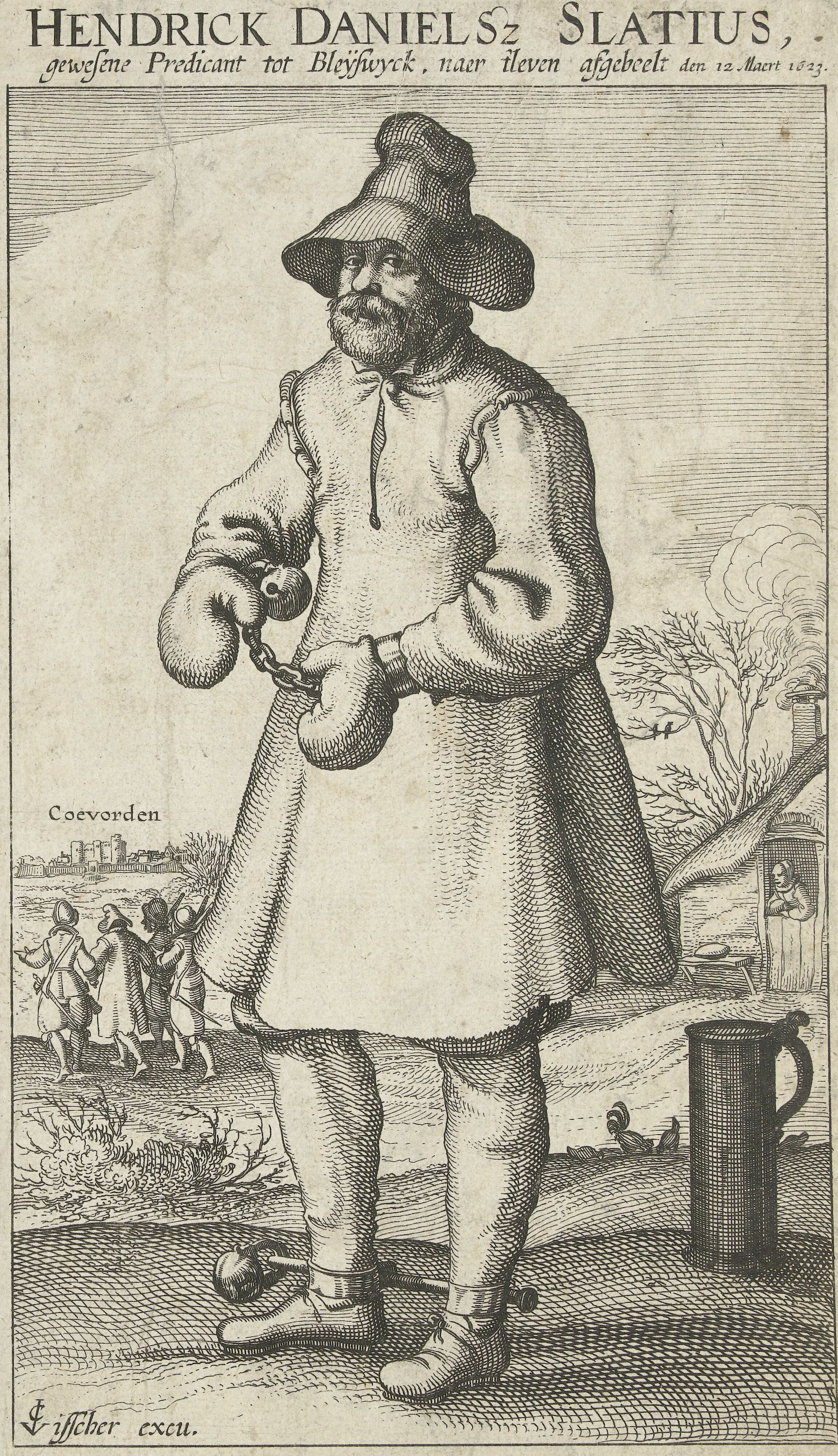

Personal life
- Born: 1585
- Died: 5 May 1623

Religious life
- Religion: Christianity

Hendrick Danielsz Slatius (Oosterland, 1585 – The Hague, 5 May 1623; also known as: Hendrik Slaet, Henricus Slatius) was a Netherlands remonstrant preacher and writer. He participated in a foiled plot to murder Maurice, Prince of Orange.

== Education ==
Slatius at one time intended to be sent to the Dutch East Indies as a preacher in the service of the Dutch East India Company (VOC). In 1603, the Heren XVII (board of directors of the VOC) "ordered that enquiries be made for two suitable and qualified persons to carry God's word, and from the Scriptures to exhort folk against all superstition and the seduction of Moors and Atheists". However, in the period before the foundation of the Indian Seminary in 1622, the company continued to struggle to interest competent and willing persons. Slatius was the first with whom a contract was signed in 1606. This stipulated, among other things, that the company would pay his theology studies at the University of Leiden and that he would then leave for the Dutch East Indies in the service of the VOC. During his final exam in Middelburg, concerns were raised against Slatius because he was a proponent of Arminianism based on the ideas of Jacobus Arminius. He then took the exam in Utrecht, where he passed but was advised to conform to the ideas of Gomarus. Slatius eventually decided not to go to the East.

== Ministry and publications ==
Slatius became a minister in Bleiswijk, outspokenly propounding Remonstrant doctrine. After the Synod of Dordrecht, he was removed from office, after which he fled to Antwerp. He published several works from Antwerp.

== Plot and betrayal ==
As a result of a power-struggle between Prince Maurice and Johan van Oldenbarnevelt, Oldenbarnevelt was put to death in 1619. Deeply alienated by this, Slatius and others, including Oldenbarnevelt's sons Willem and Reinier, plotted an attempt on Prince Maurice's life. In 1623 Slatius provided the weapons that would be used in the attack. Claes Michielsz Bontenbal, secretary of Zevenhuizen, contributed to the financing. The plot was betrayed and Slatius fled. He disguised himself in peasant clothes and travelled via Amsterdam, Leeuwarden and Groningen to Drenthe, intending to escape to Germany. A reward of four thousand guilders was offered for his capture. He was apprehended at an inn in Rolde. Worried by the presence of soldiers, he paid for his meal, but left a full jug of beer untouched. This raised suspicion among the soldiers, who followed and arrested him. Slatius was brought to The Hague via Coevorden, Zwolle and Amsterdam.

== Imprisonment and execution ==
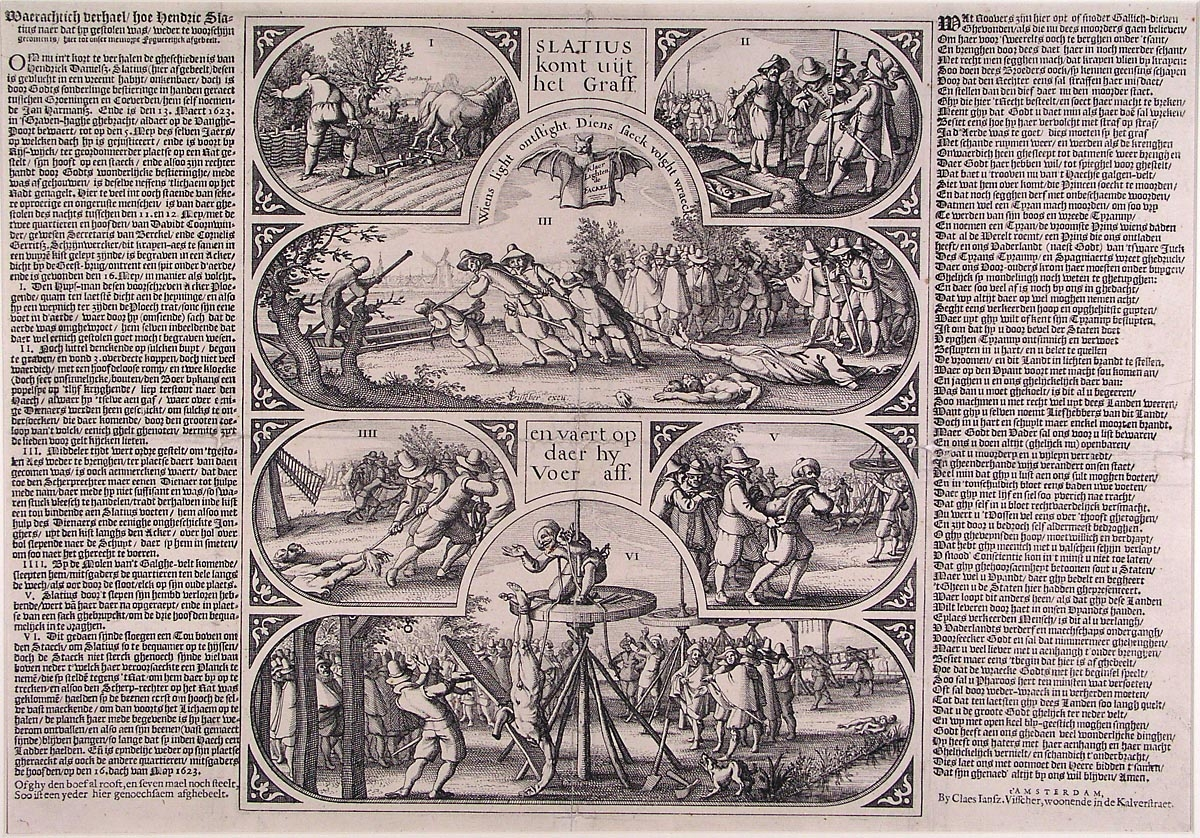
Retrieval of the buried and hidden corpse of Slatius in 1623, print room Museum Boijmans Van Beuningen

During his imprisonment, Slatius tried to avoid the death penalty by distancing himself from his Remonstrant views. When this hope turned out to be vain, he revoked his recantation. He was sentenced to death. In his farewell letter to his wife, he wrote: "My soul is abhors the Calvinists". He also instructed her to give the children a Christian education, and to show them the evils of Calvinism. Prior to execution he was held in the Gevangenpoort in The Hague.

The artist Claes Jansz Visscher (1587–1652), a strict Calvinist, engraved a print showing the imprisoned pastor Slatius, dressed in peasant clothes and chained hand and foot.
