= Van Oldenbarnevelt =

Van Oldenbarnevelt is a Dutch surname. Notable people with the surname include:

- Johan van Oldenbarnevelt (1547–1619), Dutch nobility
- Willem van Oldenbarnevelt (1590 – before 1638), Dutch nobility
- Reinier van Oldenbarnevelt (c.1588–1623), Dutch nobility
