= Maria van Utrecht =

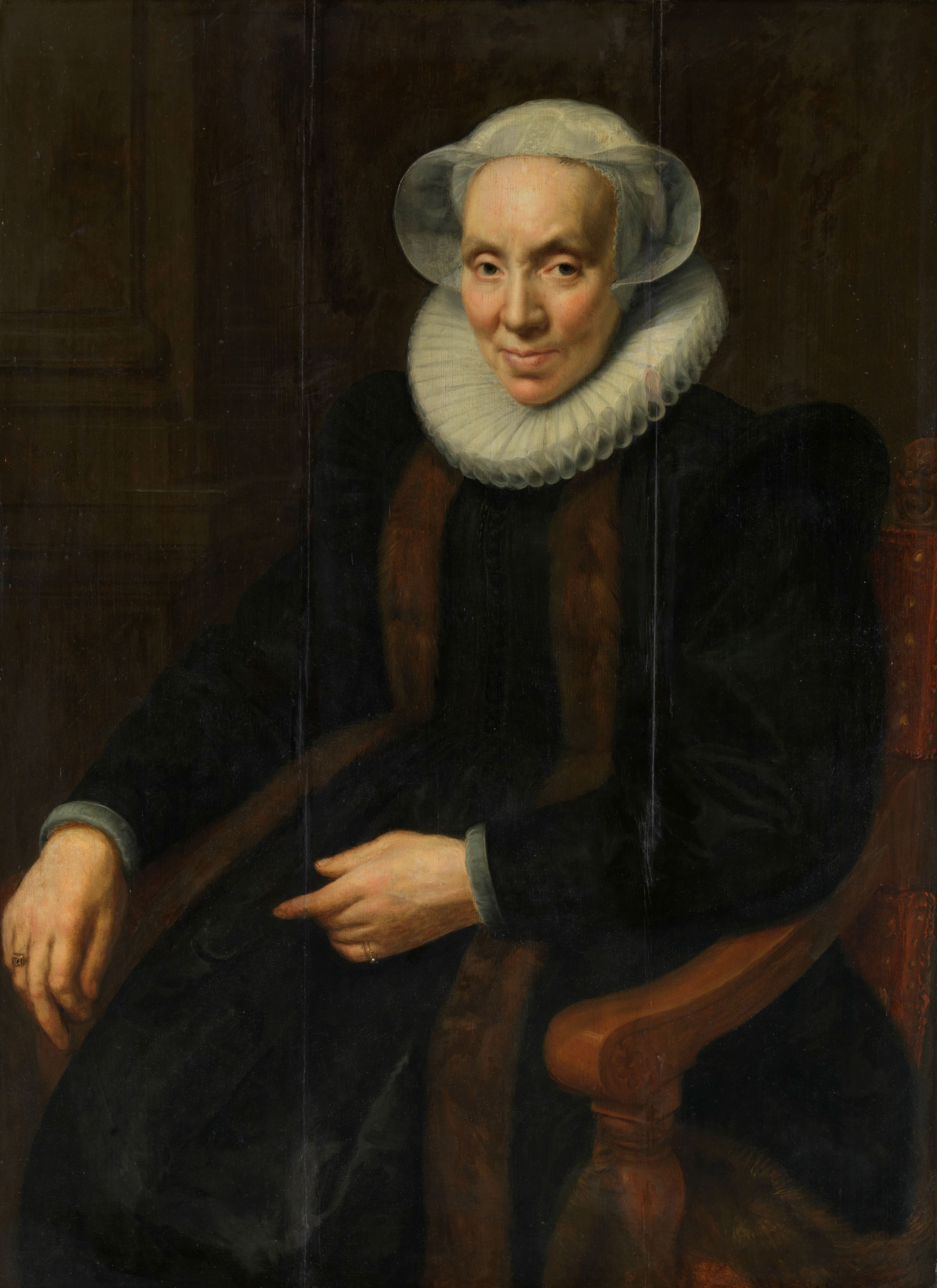
Portrait of Maria van Utrecht by Paulus Moreelse, 1615 (Rijksmuseum, Amsterdam).

Maria van Utrecht (c.1551, possibly in Rodenrijs – 19 March 1629, Amersfoort) was a notable figure in the Dutch Revolt and the history of the Netherlands.

== Life ==
Born as the illegitimate daughter of Magdalene Jansdr van Utrecht, Maria grew up in Delft with and kept house for Jacob and Paul van Utrecht, her unmarried maternal uncle and aunt. Jacob was a powerful regent in Delft, owning forty ships and later becoming 'dijkgraaf' and 'hoogheemraad' for Delfland. He wished to make Maria his sole heir but first she needed to become legitimate - she was therefore adopted by Adriaan Willemsz Plas, a barge owner from Vlaardingen. Plas may also have been her biological father, since he had already drawn up a statement in 1569 stating he was her father and had it witnessed by a notary.

Jacob van Utrecht died in 1575 and the same year Maria married Johan van Oldenbarnevelt, thus transferring her inherited estate to him. They lived in her Delft house with her uncle Paul until in 1576 Johan was appointed pensionary of Rotterdam, to which they then moved. Maria and Johan had two daughters (Geertruid and Maria) and three sons (Jan, who died young, Willem and Reinier). Geertruid married Reinout van Brederode and Maria married Cornelis van der Mijle.

Maria and Johan's sons were educated in law and so when her husband was arrested she attempted to have his sentence commuted to house arrest to have his trial transferred from the special court of the States General of the Netherlands to the States of Holland. These efforts proved fruitless and her subsequent protests against the refusal to provide a proper defence counsel for Johan and requests to visit him in prison were all also ignored or refused. Johan maintained his innocence and so no reprieve or pardon was offered, which also applied to his wife and children.

After Johan's execution, Maria asked to bury his body in their house at Berkel, but instead he was buried in the chapel of the Hof van Holland without his family present. Many of what had been Maria's estates were also confiscated by the States General on Johan's death. Johan's sons plotted revenge and in 1623 made a failed assassination attempt against Maurice, Prince of Orange. Willem managed to flee but Reinier was arrested. Maria sent Maurice a request for clemency, but he replied by asking why she asked for a pardon for him but had never requested one for her husband - she replied that "My husband was innocent, my son was not".

== Sources ==
- Spoor, Gerard Jalkes (1873). Maria van Utrecht: (13 Mei 1624) (in Dutch).
- http://resources.huygens.knaw.nl/vrouwenlexicon/lemmata/data/Utrecht
