= Jacob Westerbaen =

Dutch poet (1599–1670)

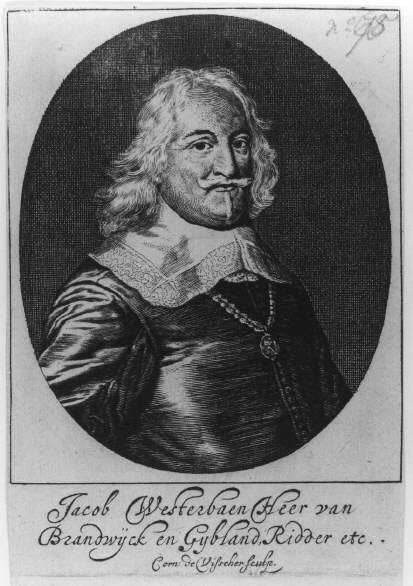
Jacob Wetserbaen in 1650.

Ridder Jacob Westerbaen (7 September 1599 – 31 March 1670), heer (squire) of Brantwyck-en-Ghybelant, was a Dutch poet.

== Life ==
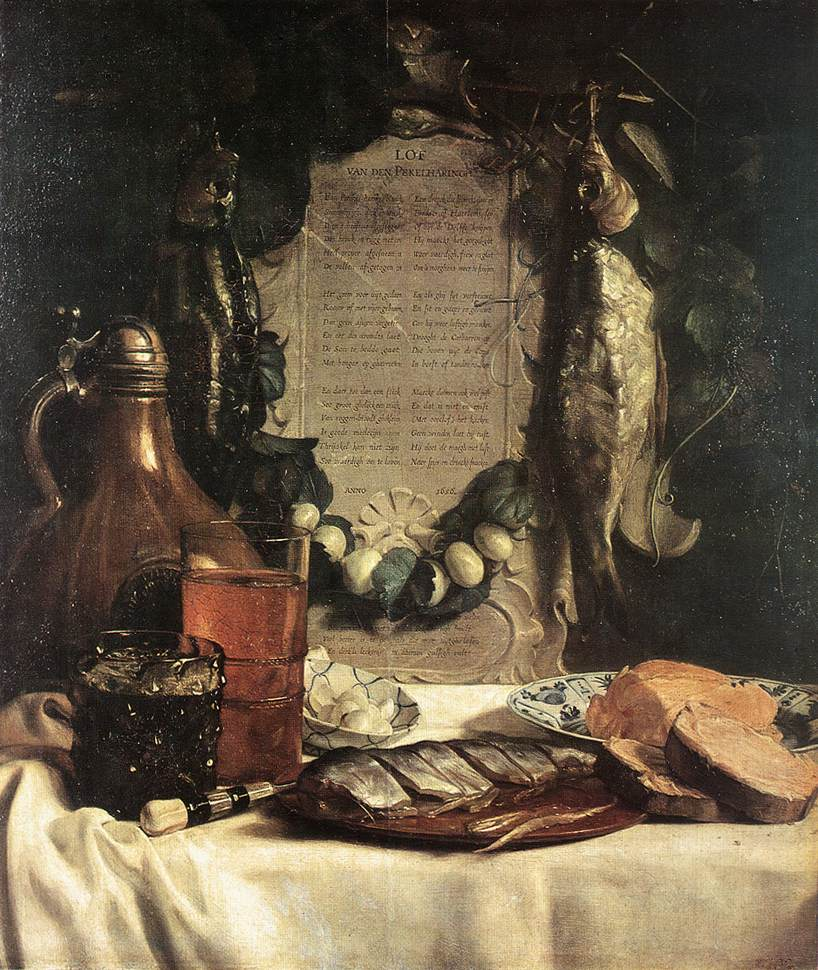
His poem "In praise of herring" became so popular that it decorates this painting by his nephew, Jozef de Bray.

Westerbaen was born in The Hague, the son of a rope maker, and was initially schooled in the Staten-College, then as secretary and preacher of the Remonstrants of the Synod of Dort. There, he studied medicine, after which he established himself in 1623 as a physician in the Hague. Two years later, he married Anna Weytsen, the widow of Reinier van Groenevelt, despite opposition from her noble family.

He was a good friend of Constantijn Huygens. Later, he came into contact with Jacob Cats, Blasius (1639–1672) and Jan Vos (ca. 1610–1667), becoming good friends with all three. When Oldenbarnevelt was executed for political reasons, Westerbaen retained possession of the victim's walking stick, inspiring the Republic's great poet, Vondel, to his famous poem 't Stockske ("The Little Walking-Stick").

Westerbaen wanted to apply for work elsewhere: Ockenburgh near Loosduinen, where he lived from 1652 until his death. He described it in a poem imitating the style of Huygens.

He fought fiercely against orthodox preachers, for instance in writings such as Krancken-Troost voor Israel in Holland ("Comfort for a Sick Israel in Holland") and wrote and translated plays, mostly comedies.

Ick doe hier 's avonds de Comedianten spelen, En vreese Haeg, noch Hof, en oock de Preekstoel niet: De Schou-burgh is hier vrij.

(I have Comedians play here of a night,
And fear not Hague, nor Court, nay, not even Pulpit:
The Theatre here is free.)

== Works ==
- 't Noodsaeckelycke Mal (de Liefde) (1624) [on love]
- Minnedichten (1624) [love poetry]
- Gedichten (1644) [poetry]
- Davids Psalmen in Nederduytsche rijmen gestelt (1655 and 1656) [the Psalms translated]
- Gedichten, verdeylt in vijf boecken (1657 and 1672) [five books of poetry]
- Seneca's Troas (1658) (adapted and translated)
- Erasmus' Lof der Zotheid (1659) (adaption and translation of The Praise of Follie)
- P. Terentius' De ses comedien (1663) (adapted and translated)
- Kracht des geloofs van den voortreffelijcken ende vermaerden Nederduytschen poeet Joost van Vondelen (1648) [a eulogy of Vondel]
- Laurier-krans
- Herstellinge van Karel II [on King Charles II]
- Zege-Zangh op de Verovering van Funen [triumphal ode]

He also worked on the Heroides of Ovid and the Basia of Janus Secundus.

== Quote ==
ARBEID

De wetenschap steeckt in geen bed met pluymen.
Wie leeren wil, moet vroegh de veeren ruymen;
Wie eert ^{1} noch eght, die heeft geen kans van graen;
Wie dorschen wil, moet eerst de ploegh doen gaen;
Wie niet en turft, kan zich daer nae niet warmen;
Wie winst wil doen, die reppe hand’en armen;
Wie prijs begeert, die stelle zich te loop:
Voor arbeyd heeft God alle dingh te koop.

1. eren = ploegen.
