= Benjamin Aubery du Maurier =

French huguenot statesman

Benjamin Aubery du Maurier (La Fontaine-Saint-Martin, August 1566 – La Fontaine-Saint-Martin 1636) was a French huguenot statesman and ambassador of his country to the States General of the Dutch Republic during the "Truce Quarrels". He tried in vain to save the life of Dutch statesman Johan van Oldenbarnevelt after he was sentenced to death in the Trial of Oldenbarnevelt, Grotius and Hogerbeets.

== Early life ==
Aubery was born the son of Jehan Aubery du Maurier and his second wife Madeleine Froger. His parents were both huguenots. He was therefore also raised in that faith. He studied in Le Mans, and after 1582 in Paris at several colleges, among which the Collège de Clermont. He studied philosophy under Theodore Beza for a year after 1583 in the Republic of Geneva. He was destined for a career in the noblesse de robe, because a great-uncle (Jacques Aubery) was an advocate before the parlement de Paris during the reign of Henry II of France. (He took part in the prosecution of the perpetrators of the Mérindol massacre.). But the events of the French religious troubles intervened. In 1585 (a year after his father died) the huguenots were given six months to convert to Roman Catholicism or to go into exile. Aubery decided to join the army of the prince of Condé and took part in the Battle of Coutras under Navarre in 1587. From there his career took flight.

== Personal life ==
Aubrey married Marie Magdeleine in 1600 in Paris. They would have eleven children of whom Louis Aubery du Maurier (a historian) is the best known. Other sons were Maximilien (who later served in the States Army), and Daniel (also a military officer). When he lived in the Netherlands as ambassador he had them educated by Benjamin Prideaux as preceptor on an estate belonging to Oldenbarnevelt. Among his daughters were Louise, born in 1614 in The Hague (who had Louise de Coligny for a godmother); Eleonore, born in 1615 in The Hague (with Frederick Henry, Prince of Orange as a godfather); and Emilia (with Countess Emilia of Nassau as a godmother). His first wife Marie died in 1620 in The Hague when Aubery was ambassador there. She was buried in the Grote Kerk with a sumptuous grave monument. He remarried in 1622 with Renée de Jaucourt de Villarnoult, a relative of his mentor Philippe du Plessis-Mornay.

== Career ==
=== Assistant of the Huguenot Great Nobles ===
Aubery first went into the employ of du Plessis-Mornay as a secretary when that minister of the king of Navarre became governor of Saumur in 1589. He accompanied du Plessis-Mornay when he was sent on a mission to Queen Elizabeth I in 1591–92. On 22 October 1590 Henri IV made Aubery a secretary in his household of Navarre. After du Plessis-Mornay broke with Henri IV, Aubery also became intendant to the new favorite, Henri de La Tour d'Auvergne, Duke of Bouillon on 1 June 1592, shortly after the duke had married Charlotte de La Marck. When that lady died in 1594 Aubery helped select a new wife, Countess Elisabeth of Nassau, the half-sister of the Dutch stadtholder Maurice, Prince of Orange.

Aubery remained in the service of the duke, but when Bouillon fell in disfavor after he was implicated in the conspiracy of Charles de Gontaut, duc de Biron in 1601, Aubery was placed in a difficult position between the king and the duke. But he managed to extricate himself, principally by being instrumental in negotiating a reconciliation between the king and the duke in April 1607.

After the submission of the duke to the king Aubery quit the service of the duke and retired to his chateau du Maurier for some time. Things started to look up for Aubery when in 1607 he was approached by the envoy of France to the Dutch Republic, Paul Trude Choart, duke of Buzenval, who needed a correspondent in France to facilitate the transfer of the subsidies France paid to the Dutch Republic. But Buzenval soon after died. The successor of Buzenval had someone else in mind, but the secretary of state Nicolas de Neufville, seigneur de Villeroy overruled him. Then Villeroy's colleague Maximilien de Béthune, Duke of Sully, the Superintendent of Finances appointed Aubery controleur des restes des etats du Conseil in October 1607. (Note: Sully also became godfather to Aubery's son Maximilien on 5 November 1608 as another sign of his favor; Cf. Ouvré, p. 165) At the same time the king also showed favor to Aubery, making him one of the twenty secretaries in his royal household on 30 August 1608. But this high point in Aubery's career ended soon after the assassination of the king on 14 May 1610. Sully was soon taken down by his jealous colleagues, and took Aubery with him in his fall. Another deception was that the office of president of the audit court of the province of Nérac, that Aubery had bought in 1610 with the consent of the king, was given to another claimant by the Conseil d'Etat; Aubery only received a pension. In 1612 he retired for a while to his chateau.

=== Embassy to the Dutch Republic ===
But then Villeroy asked him for the post of ambassador to the Dutch Republic, as successor of Eustache de Refuge. This was an important post as the Republic played a big part in the European policy of Henri IV and later the regency of Queen Marie de' Medici. The Republic had become an important ally in the early 1590s when Henri was fighting both the Catholic League's armies and the Spanish Army of Flanders. After he triumphed in France Henri needed the Republic as a counterweight against Spain in Europe. He definitely wanted the Republic in the French sphere of influence. When the Habsburg regime in the Spanish Netherlands made peace overtures to their northern counterparts when a stalemate in the Eighty Years' War developed in 1607, Henri sent Pierre Jeannin as a special envoy to The Hague to defend the French interests. Jeannin was instrumental in helping Land's Advocate of Holland Oldenbarnevelt obtain the Twelve Years' Truce with Spain (after a peace proved elusive) over the objections of stadtholder Maurice. The alliance between the two countries was founded on two treaties. The first one, concluded on 13 January 1608 and renewed on 17 June 1609, valid for the duration of the Truce, promised that France would send 10,000 soldiers to help the States General in case of war; the Republic 5000 to help France. The two countries promised not to make treaties that would harm the interests of the other. The second treaty of 22 June 1609 promised two French regiments (4100 men in total) and two companies of light horse for service in the Dutch States Army, with an annual subsidy of 600,000 livres. The Queen confirmed this arrangement in 1611. These French troops would later play an important part.

Villeroy had selected Aubery in preference to several other candidates, because he was a moderate Protestant with undoubted loyalty to the crown. The new ambassador needed to be a Protestant, because a catholic would be distrusted in the Protestant Republic, but he should not be a partisan of the huguenot fanatics in France. The salary for the ambassador to the States General of the Dutch Republic was 12,000 livres, supplemented with 24,000 livres for the post of intendant of the French finances in Holland. Aubery took up the post on 20 May 1613.

The first, somewhat disagreeable, task for Aubery was to engineer the recall of the Dutch ambassador in France, Francis van Aarssens (son of the secretary of the States General Cornelis van Aarsens), who was seen as "too pushy" by the French court. Discreet overtures to Oldenbarnevelt did not prove sufficient, as van Aarssens put up a spirited defense before the States General. So Aubery had to openly disavow van Aarssens, which did the trick, but earned him and Oldenbarnevelt the undying enmity of the politician, who was influential with stadtholder Maurice.

Next Aubery had to defend the interests of France when the Republic intervened in the War of the Jülich Succession, when despite the Truce it almost came to blows with Spain, which Aubery and de Refuge (who had become French envoy in Brussels) helped avoid through mediation. Meanwhile, events in France herself took a turn for the worse with the repeated revolts of the princes of the blood against the regency of Queen Marie. This led to attempts of both sides to get the French regiments in Dutch service to return to France, which Aubery managed to thwart. This did not endear him to the princes. Meanwhile, on 3 September 1615 Queen Marie had appointed Aubery conseiller d'État; this was confirmed by the new king Louis XIII on 31 September

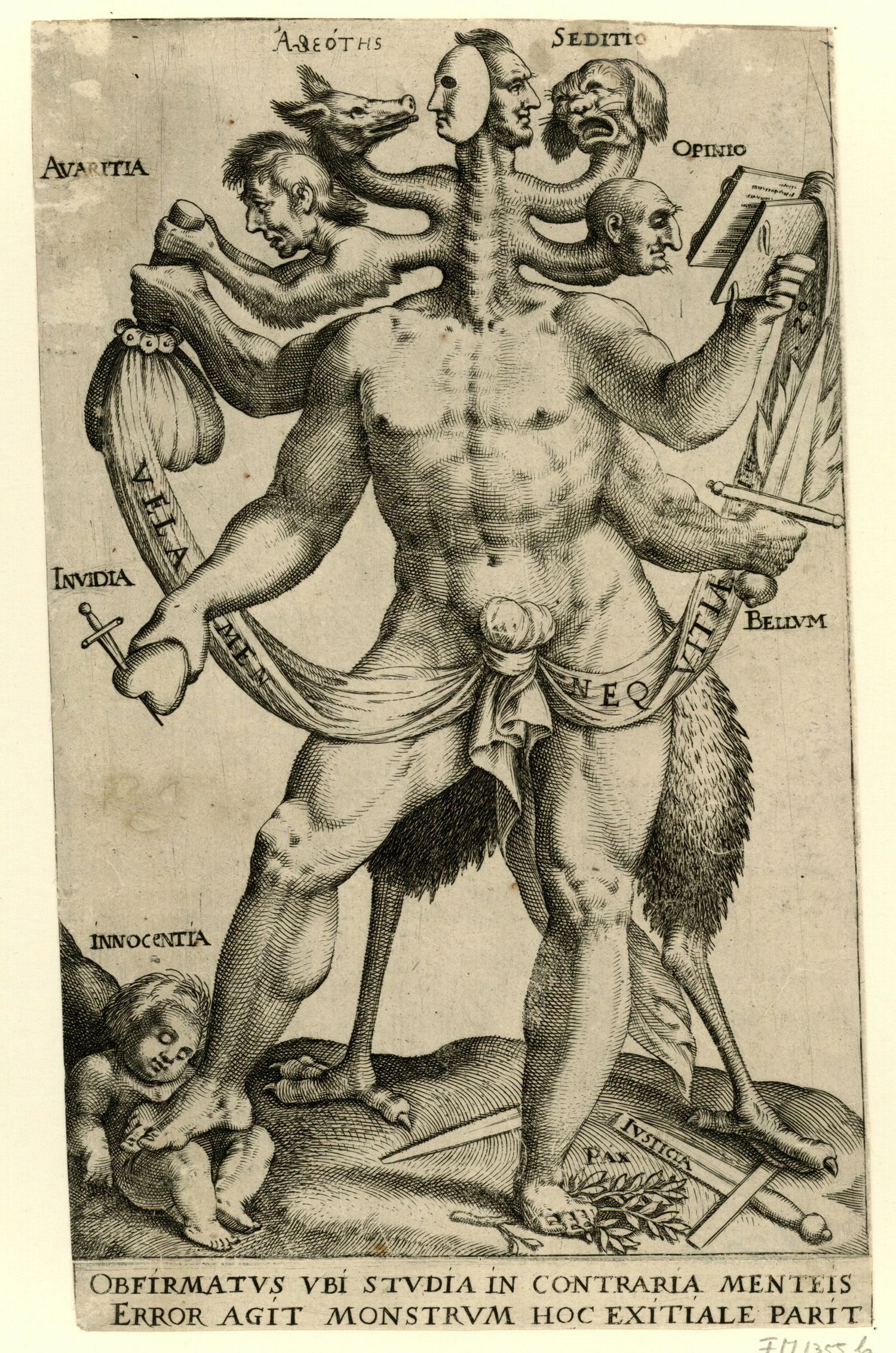
Polemical allegory of Arminianism as a five-headed monster, referring to the five articles of the 1610 Remonstrance

Aubery of necessity played an important role in the religious and political crisis in the Dutch Republic that developed between 1614 and 1619 and that has become known in Dutch historiography as the Bestandstwisten (Truce Quarrels). This started with a quarrel between two professors of theology at Leiden University, Franciscus Gomarus and Jacobus Arminius, about the interpretation of the dogma of the Predestination. Soon other ministers of the public church, the Dutch Reformed Church took sides, and with them their flocks in the local congregations of that church. As the Dutch authorities felt a duty to keep the peace in the church, so as to avoid a schism, the States of Holland and West Friesland got involved when the followers of Arminius in 1610 presented a remonstrance (petition) to them, that was soon followed by a counter-remonstrance from the other side. The States were reluctant to take sides in the doctrinal quarrel, but when the quarrel flowed over into the public sphere, and ministers of either side refused to recognize the qualifications of the others to administer the Lord's Supper and congregations split into warring parties, they felt constraint to issue the so-called "For the Peace of the Church" Resolution in January 1614 (drafted by the Rotterdam pensionary Hugo Grotius), which prohibited preaching about the quarrel from the pulpit on pain of losing their livings for the preachers. (Note: Though the Resolution did not prescribe one or the other standpoint in the doctrinal debate and did not prohibit discussions within the confines of the university, or in learned treatises written in Latin) Unfortunately, this only proved to pour fuel on the fire. Violence of especially Counter-Remonstrant mobs directed against Remonstrant regenten and city magistrates, while the local schutterijen refused to offer protection and the federal troops also refused to intervene, caused the States of Holland to issue a further so-called Sharp Resolution in 1617. This authorized city governments to recruit their own mercenary forces, called waardgelders, to keep the peace. This was seen by the stadtholder as a dangerous potential threat, because the waardgelders might come into armed conflict with the federal States Army, which he commanded as Captain general. Maurice then chose the side of the Counter-Remonstrants and started a slow-moving coup d'état that took the form of his undermining the regime of Oldenbarnevelt by "turning around" by intimidation the city governments that supported the latter in the States, and so engineering a majority of the States General opposing Holland. This majority also forced through the convening of a National Synod of the Reformed Church, over the opposition of Oldenbarnevelt and his allies, with the object of deciding the doctrinal controversy.

In this conflict Aubery did not stay neutral, but he chose the side of the Oldenbarnevelt regime on the orders of the French court (that, as Catholics, preferred the perceived "least calvinist" Arminians). He advised the States General against convening a National Synod in October 1617. But in vain, the majority of four provinces voted in November 1617 to convene such a Synod in Dordrecht in 1618 and to invite foreign theologians (also from France (Note: The French court objected to this idea; Cf. Ouvré, p. 269)). Aubery then approached the States of Holland to advise them to try to solve the matter with a provincial synod, which was also the point of view of Oldenbarnevelt. But things got out of hand when Maurice started to force matters in January 1618 with a coup in Nijmegen. The matter of the synod went to the background temporarily. Aubery tried repeatedly to mediate between Maurice and Oldenbarnevelt, but in his dispatches to the French government he vented his suspicion that Maurice was bent on replacing the people who had brought about the Truce and to replace them with members of the Dutch war party

The States General decided to send a deputation to king Louis to invite him to send three or four French Protestant theologians to the planned National Synod, but the French government prevented this by sending Jean de Thumery, sieur de Boississe (a seasoned diplomat. who had been ambassador to England in 1601) as a special envoy to The Hague to help mediate in the quarrel around the Synod. De Boissise arrived in early August 1618, just after the political events had reached crisis mode with the forced disbandment of the waardgelders of the city of Utrecht by a mission of the States General, led by stadtholder Maurice at the end of July. Maurice proceeded by changing the composition of the States of Utrecht, robbing Holland of its only ally in the States General. When de Boissise made his maiden address to the States General in mid August, he therefore could do little to alter the state of affairs. He made things worse by complaining about a libelous pamphlet van Aarssen had published about the alleged sinister designs of king Louis in cahoots with Spain. Van Aarssens himself wrote the polite rejection of this diplomatic note by the States General. Meanwhile, on 29 August 1618 Maurice had arrested Oldenbarnevelt, Grotius and two other leaders of the majority in the States of Holland, thereby consolidating his coup.

On 17 September 1618 Aubery and Boissise visited Maurice to protest the arrests. Maurice told them that the arrests were necessary because Oldenbarnevelt had conspired with Spain to bring the Republic back under the "Spanish yoke". This also made it necessary to change the composition of the governments of the cities in Holland that had supported Oldenbarnevelt, he said. The two ambassadors replied that France was a guarantor of the old constitution of the Republic and that these changes were illegal in their eyes. But they were powerless to do anything about it. In November the National Synod commenced, without French participation; it would become known as the Synod of Dort

Meanwhile, the trial of Oldenbarnevelt had proceeded behind closed doors, without much being made public except for vague utterances by the likes of Aarssens that "the life of the prisoners was incompatible with the security of the state". The French ambassadors addressed the States General on 12 December and expressed the hope that the trial would be brief and the prisoners be judged by their own court (i.e. the Hof van Holland), according to the established laws. They added that the king of France demanded clemency in view of the services Oldenbarnevelt had rendered, and the old friendship between the two countries. The response of the States General, drafted by Aarssens, on 17 December, feigned surprise about the reproach by the French king, and predicted that the king would think differently when he learned from the verdicts, which were expected soon, about the gravity of the conspiracy.

To the frustration of Aubery, his old enemy Aarssens was appointed by Maurice as a replacement of one of the purged members of the Holland ridderschap (College of Nobles (Note: Which College had one vote in the States of Holland; the College had been one of the mainstays of the Oldenbarnevelt regime, but the appointment of new members changed its political makeup)) on 19 January 1619, which was taken as a new insult to France. Still, the ridderschap made a last attempt to have the trial transferred to the regular court of Holland, but eventually consented to the installation of a court of 24 delegated judges of the States General, of whom half were to be nominated by the States of Holland. Nevertheless, the two ambassadors made a last attempt on 23 January to have the prisoners tried by the Holland court, evidently without success.

Seeing that he could not do anything useful anymore, Boissise asked to be recalled on 12 February 1619, and Aubery did the same a few days later. But then events in France took a negative turn. Queen Marie, who had been a prisoner since the assassination of her counselor Concino Concini two years earlier, managed to escape from her prison in Blois on 22 February 1619, and France was once again thrown into civil war. This made it impossible for Aubery to leave his post. The States General felt little inclination to intervene in this French crisis, which gave Boissise occasion to remind them of their treaty obligations in his farewell address to the States General of 23 March 1619. Aubery remained alone in The Hague. He had received instructions to try and intercede in the trial, which he did with an address to the States General on 1 May 1613. This was received as an attack on the justice of the delegated judges. Aubery then pleaded with one of those judges, Cromhout (also president of the Hof van Holland) to transmit his plea to his colleagues

The verdict against Oldenbarnevelt was taken on Saturday 11 May 1619. He would receive the death sentence, which was to be executed on Monday 13 May. This was kept secret, but word got out to Louise de Coligny, widow of William the Silent and stepmother of Maurice, a good friend of both Oldenbarnevelt and her countryman Aubery, in the night of 12 on 13 May 1619. She warned Aubery and went herself at 4 o'clock in the morning to Maurice to plead for mercy for Oldenbarnevelt (Note: As stadtholder Maurice had the residual power of the pardon, though he was emphatically not the sovereign of the Republic.) At the same time Aubery went to the States General, also in the Binnenhof government center, and demanded an audience, but because of the early hour the States General was not in session. Aubery therefore composed a letter on the spot, that read in part:

S'il defaut quelque chose à la sûreté de cet État, il n'y sera pas suppléé par le peu de sang restant à un vieillard qui par le cours de nature et sans l'aide d'aucune violence ne peut éviter qu'il ne lui paye bientôt son tribut ... Si vous permettez cette exécution vous rechargerez une pesante angoisse sur tants de magistrats que l'on a déposés en cette province ... ils se reputeront de nouveau flestris en cette personne avec laquelle ils ont eu non seulement communauté d'avis, mais aussi d'affliction et de destablissement. (Note: If something is missing for the safety of this state, it will not be compensated for by the little remaining blood of an old man who by the course of nature and without the help of any violence cannot avoid paying him soon his tribute ... If you allow this execution you will reload a heavy anguish on so many magistrates that have been deposed in this province ... they will again appear feeble toward this person with whom they had not only community of opinion, but also of affliction and revocation; Cf. Ouvré, p. 301)

But his intervention was met with evasions by a few delegates of the States General who met him at this early hour. "The power had been delegated to the judges" (but you still have the power of the sovereign, Aubery replied, and you can commute the sentence) and "the States General don't have a quorum right now" (to which Aubery replied that they could defer the execution until a quorum was established). The delegates promised to inform the full States General of his requests, but he did not hear back from them before the execution had taken place the next morning. Oldenbarnevelt was taken before the court and his verdict read to him. Immediately afterward, he was taken to the scaffold and beheaded. A few days later Aubery received an answer of sorts in the form of a letter to king Louis, drafted by Aarssens, in which it was stated that the king was badly informed by his ministers; the king was too just to appear to justify such a black treason before the eyes of the whole of Europe.

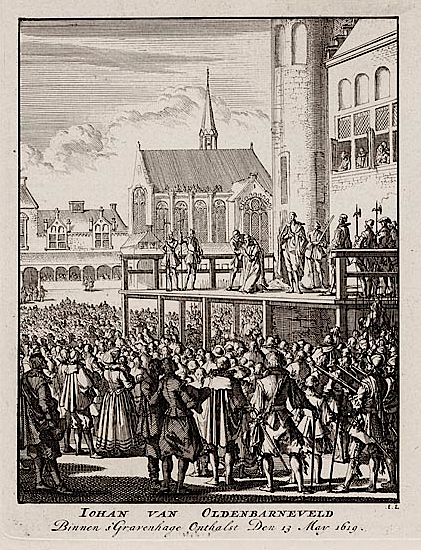
Execution of Oldenbarnevelt on 13 May 1619 by Jan Luyken

After this the relations between the Republic and France became icy for a number of years. Maurice and Aubery quarreled openly in their encounters.The exiled Arminian ministers were made welcome in France by king Louis, as well as Hugo Grotius, who escaped from his life imprisonment in Loevestein Castle in March 1621, and went into exile in Paris. When the States General outlawed him, king Louis put him under his protection and gave him a pension of 3000 livres. Grotius' Apology was printed freely in France in 1622 and smuggled to the Republic, where it was prohibited. His correspondence nevertheless entered the Republic in the French diplomatic mail.

But the French government at this time was divided between the partisans of Spain and her opponents. Queen Marie, who was again a power to be reckoned with, and who was now anti-Spain, succeeded in getting the annual subsidy of 600,000 livres to the Republic, that had been suspended since 1618, restored again with the Treaty of Compiègne in 1624, which was welcome, as the Republic had been at war with Spain since the Truce ended in 1621. Aubery was no part of this, as he had fallen victim to the fall of Nicolas Brûlart de Sillery as foreign secretary, like many other ambassadors of France. He left The Hague on 12 April 1624 and arrived on 20 April at the court in Compiègne, where the king received him with honor and renewed his appointment as conseiller d'État, but let him retire from public service.

=== Final years ===
Aubery retired to his chateau du Maurier. He spent his retirement taking care of his agricultural estates, and in maintaining a correspondence with his wide circle of friends, such as François Auguste de Thou, Nicolas-Claude Fabri de Peiresc, Daniel Heinsius, and of course Grotius, who composed an epitaph in Latin for his first wife. (Note: The correspondence with Grotius is available online in "B. Aubery du Maurier". Digitale Bibliotheek van de Nederlandse Letteren (in Dutch).) He himself wrote poetry in French and Latin and left for his children the manuscript of his Memoires that has been excerpted by Henri Ouvré and was edited by Claire Martin in 2010. (Note: Under the title Mémoires de Benjamin Aubery Du Maurier, ambassadeur protestant de Louis XIII (1566-1636). Genève: Droz. 2010. ISBN 978-2-600-01413-7..)

Aubery died after 31 July 1636 (when he received a last letter from Grotius) in the place where he was born. Grotius wrote the following distich on his picture:

Docta tabella, refers hominem, qui rectius ipse/ Magnanimum reyem, cuius imago loquens. (Note: Learned tablet, you call to mind a person more honest himself / magnanimous Reyes, whose image is speaking; Cf. Vander Aa, p. 425)

== Sources ==
- Aa, A.J. van der (1869). "Benjamin Aubery heer van Maurier, in: Biographisch Woordenboek der Nederlanden, Deel 12, eerste stuk". Digitale Bibliotheek der Nederlandse Letteren (in Dutch). pp. 424–427.
- Martin, C. "Benjamin Aubery du Maurier (1566-1636), ambassadeur protestant du Très Chrétien". Thèse en Sorbonne (in French).
- Ouvré, H. (1853). "Aubéry du Maurier. Étude sur l'histoire de la France et de la Hollande, 1566-1636. Thèse pour le doctorat des lettres présentée à la faculté de Paris". Google Books (in French). Paris: Auguste Durand.
