= Cornelis van Aerssen =

Cornelis van Aersens may refer to:

- Cornelis van Aarsens (1545–1627), a statesman in Holland
- Cornelis van Aerssen van Sommelsdijck (1637–1688), lord of Sommelsdijk, the first governor of Suriname
