= Joan Blasius =

Joan Leonardszoon Blasius (13 April 1639 – 6 December 1672) was a Dutch poet, playwright, translator and lawyer. Born near Cadzand in Oostvliet, a village now lost to the North Sea, he was the younger brother of the famous doctor Gerard Blasius.

Blasius in 1670 became director of the Amsterdam Municipal Theatre, the Amsterdamse Schouwburg, but because of this powerful position as well as the romantic nature of his works for the theatre, he incurred the enmity of the tradition oriented theatre company "Nil volentibus arduum". When he put on Plautus's Menaechmi in translation, that theatre company promptly came out with a translation of its own. Their attacks, however, were fiercely answered by Blasius' friends, especially Thomases Asselyn.

Blasius' work was in high repute amongst his contemporaries, but today critical opinion no longer holds it in high esteem.

Blasius died in Amsterdam. His friends contributed to an Album amicorum for him, which included work by such prominent authors as Joost van der Vondel, Constantijn Huygens, Joannes Antonides van der Goes, Jan Vos and Jacob Westerbaen.

== Poetry ==
- Geslachtboom der Goden en Godinnen, waarachter bijgevoegde Mengeldichten (1661)
- Fidamants Kusjes, Minnewijsen en Bijrijmen aan Celestijne (1663)
- Heilige Gedachten over het avondmaal onses Heeren (naar 't Latijn van R. Kenchenius) met noch andere Bijbelstof (1665) [an adaptation of Kenchenius' poem in Latin]

== Drama ==
- De Edelmoedige Vijanden (a comedy after Scarron) (1659)
- Lysander en Kaliste (first part, 1660; reissued 1663; second part, 1663)
- Dubbel en Enkkel (a comedy after Plautus) (1670)
- Het Huwelijk van Oroondate en Statira (after the French) (1670)
- De Malle Wedding (a farce after Boisrobert) (1671).
