= Abraham van der Eyk =

Dutch painter (1684–1724)

- Born: 1684

Abraham van der Eyk (1684–1724) was a Dutch painter born in Leiden. His son, Matthijs van der Eyk (1710–1746), was also a painter.

== Biography ==
His mother, the eldest daughter of Frans van Mieris the Elder, married the innkeeper Matthijs van der Eyk. Having lost his parents early, his uncle, the painter Willem van Mieris, became his guardian.

=== Disputes between Remonstrants and Counter-Remonstrants in 1618 ===
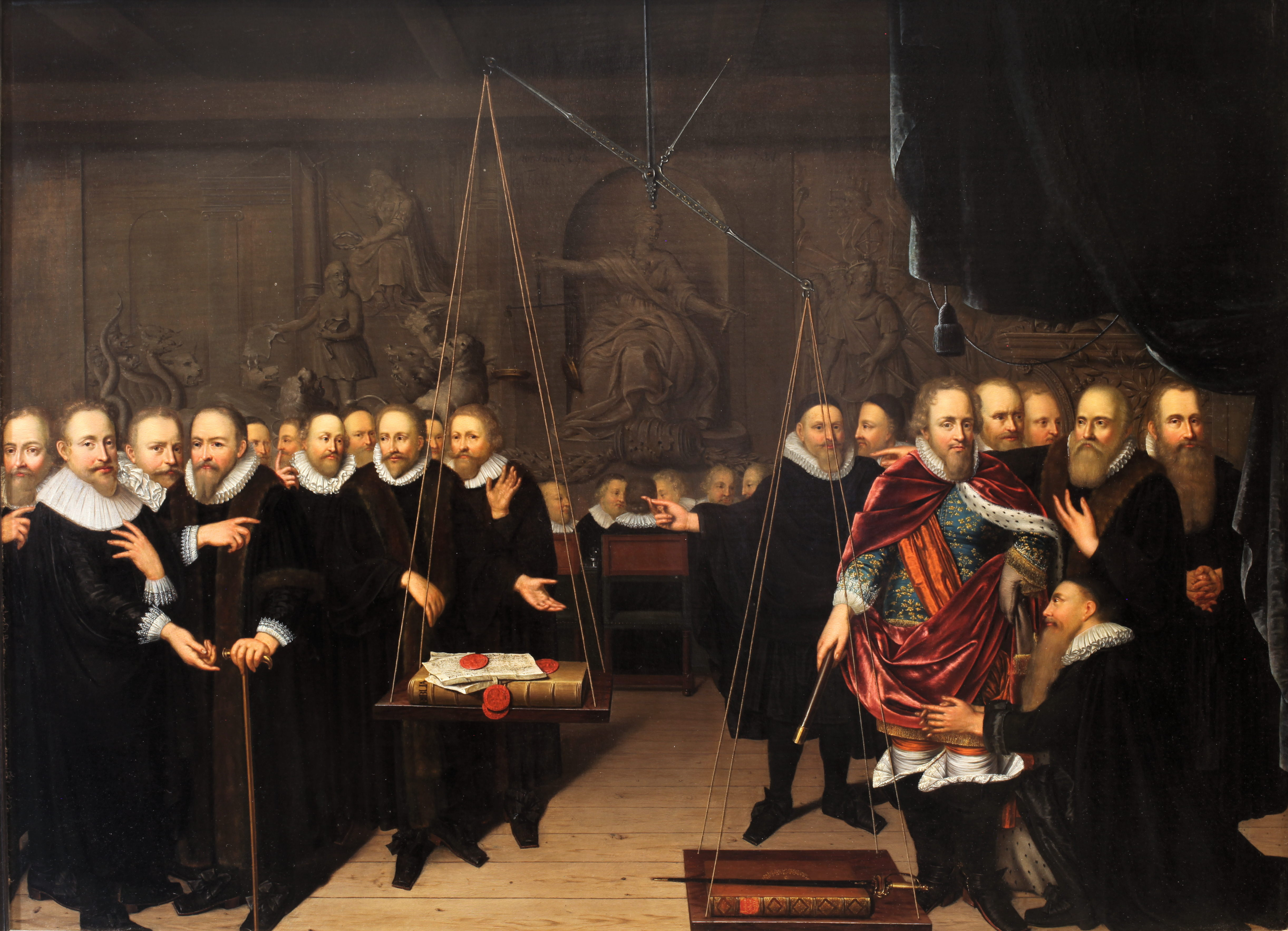
Disputes Between Remonstrants and Counter-Remonstrants in 1618. (1721)

This painting evokes through an allegory the quarrel between the Remonstrants and the Conter-Remonstrants. It was created in 1721, a century after the Synod of Dort. It is currently housed at the Museum of Fine Arts of Lyon. On the left side, the Arminians have placed a Bible on the scales along with their statements of faith, each properly validated with a wax seal. On the right, the Calvinists have placed a book labeled 'Calvin' (possibly The Institutes). Resting atop the book is the sword of Maurice of Nassau, Prince of Orange, symbolizing worldly power, which has unjustly tipped the scales in favor of the Calvinists. This alludes to a story from the Roman historian Livy, involving a reported act of the Gallic chief Brennus.

== Works ==
- Copenhagen, Statens Museum for Kunst, Woman and Servant at the Window, 1709, oil on wood, 27 x 33 cm.
- Copenhagen, Statens Museum for Kunst, Man and Servant at the Window, 1709, oil on wood, 27 x 33 cm.
- Lyon, Musée des Beaux-Arts, 1721, see above.
- Sale Schloss Ahlden (near Hodenhagen, Lower Saxony) Allegory of the Madness of Man and the Pursuit of Happiness, June 20, 1981, no. 831, 1718, oil on panel, 29.2 x 36.8 cm.
- Flemish and Dutch Paintings from the Musée des Beaux-Arts de Lyon, exhibition catalog, Paris, Dutch Institute, Lyon, Musée des Beaux-Arts, 1991 (notices by Hans Buijs and Mària van Berge-Gerbaud), no. 17, pp. 46–49.
