= Gerard Blasius =

Dutch physician and anatomist

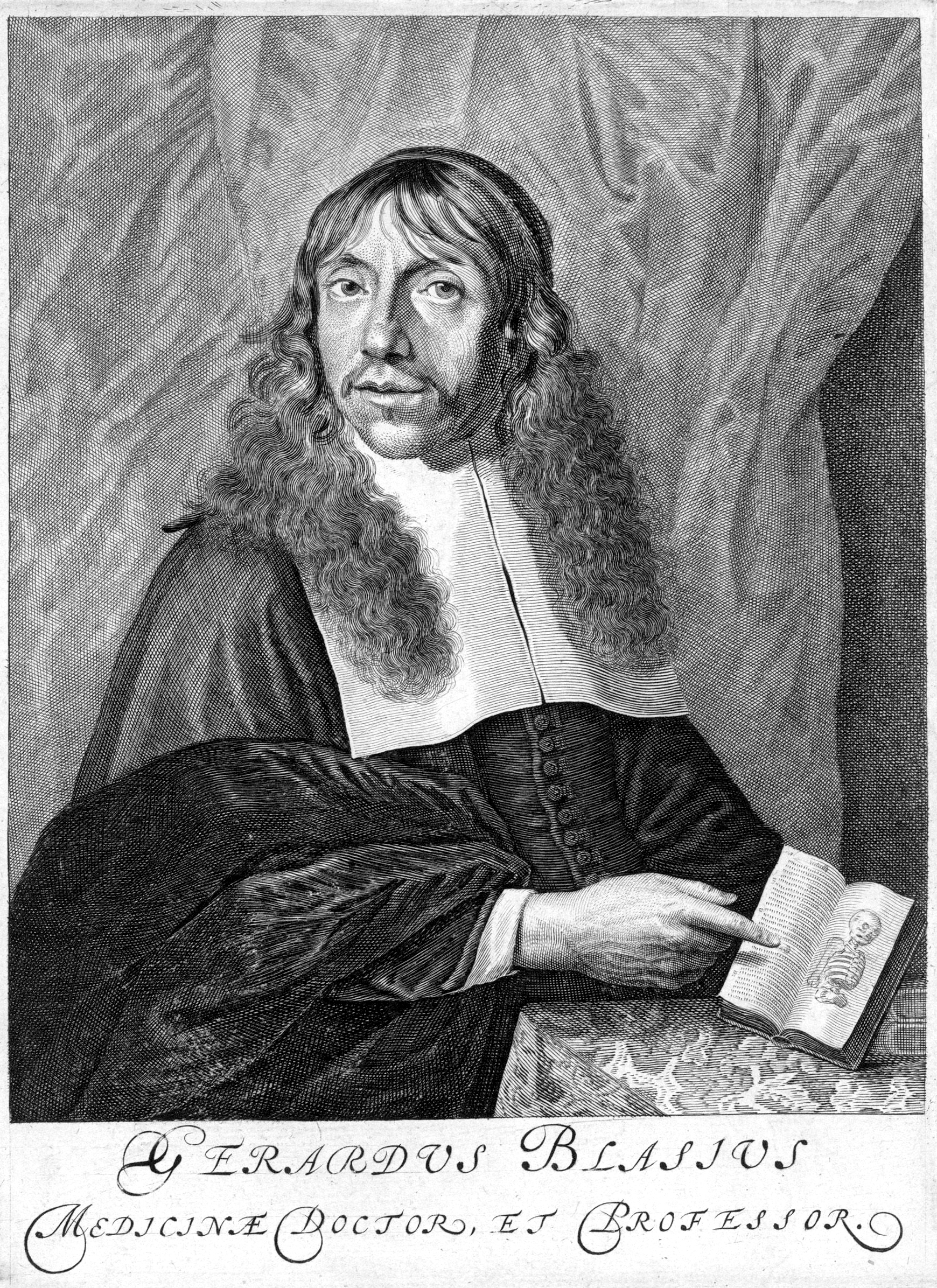

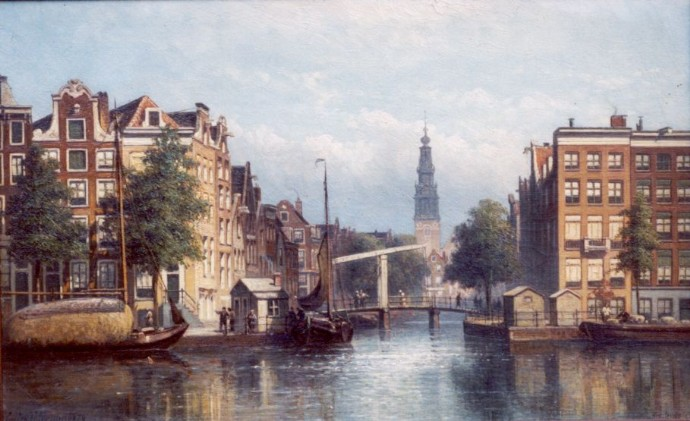
Groenburgwal/Staalkade, where Blasius lived, with Zuiderkerk at the end. Painting by Eduard Alexander Hilverdink in 1879.

Gerard "Gerrit" Leendertszoon Blasius (1627–1682) was a Dutch physician and anatomist. He was born in Amsterdam and was the eldest son of Leonhard Blasius (died 1644), who had worked as an architect in Copenhagen. Gerard started his studies there, but the family moved to Leiden after his father died.

Around 1655, Blasius became a physician in Amsterdam. In October 1659, he was appointed to the Athenaeum Illustre but without being paid. In the next year, he became Amsterdam's first professor in medicine. At his home or in the hospital, corpses were dissected. In 1661, he claimed the discovery of Stensen's duct made by his pupil Nicolas Stensen.

Blasius had married Cornelia van Ottinga in 1653. His younger brother was the poet Joan Blasius.

Blasius died in Amsterdam in 1682.

== Works ==
A list of works:

- Disputatio physica de principatu cordis, etc Praes Albertus Kyper (1655)
- Impetus Jacobi Primerosii doctoris medici, in Vop. Fort. Plempium ... retusus / a Gerardo Leon. Blasio (1659)
- Commentaria, in syntagma anatomicum ... Joann. Veslingii / Ger. Leon. Blasius
- Oratio inauguralis de iis quae homo naturae, quae arti, debeat. / Gerardus Leon. Blasius
- Anatome contracta (1660)
- Medicina generalis nova accurataque methodo fundamenta exhibens / Gerardus Leonardi Blasius (1661)
- Pest-geneesing en bewaaring voor dezelve. (1663)
- Observata anatomica in homine, simia, equo variisque animalibus aliis Accedunt extraordinaria in homine reperta praxin medicam aeque ac anatomen illustrantia n (1664)
- Medicina universa; hygieines et therapeutices fundamenta methodo nova brevissimè exhibens (1665) Gerardi Blasii, ab Oost-vliet ...
- Anatome medullae spinalis, et nervorum inde provenientium (1666)
- Anatome contracta, in gratiam discipulorum conscripta, & edita (1666)
- Observationes anatomicae selectiores collegii privati Amstelodamensis, figuris aliquot illustr
- Observationes anatomicae selectiores amstelodamensium 1667, 1671
- Institutionum medicarum compendium, disputationibus XII ... absolutum / Gerardus Leon. Blasius
- Miscellanea anatomica, hominis, brutorumque variorum, fabricam diversam magnâ parte exhibentia (1673) Gerardi Blasii med. doct. & prof.
- Observata anatomica in homine, simiâ, equo, vitulo, ove, testudine, echino, glire, serpente, ardeâ, Gerardi Blasii ab Oost-Vliet ... variisque animalibus aliis. : Accedunt extraordinaria in homine reperta, praxin medicinam æque ac anatomen illustrantia (1674)
- Ontleeding des menschelyken lichaems / beschreeven en in verscheydene figuren afgebeelt door Geerard Blasius (1675)
- Observationes medicae anatomicae rariores (1677)
- Observationes medicae rariores in quibus multa ad anatomiam et medicinam spectantia deteguntur
- Zootomiae, seu Anatomes variorum animalium pars prima (1676)
- Medicina curatoria methodo nova in gratiam discipulorum conscripta (1680)
- Anatome animalium, terrestrium variorum, volatilium, aquatilium, serpentum, insectorum, ovorumque, structuram naturalem ... figuris variis illustrata (1681)

== Sources ==
- Miert, D. van (2005) Illuster onderwijs. Het Amsterdamse Athenaeum in de Gouden Eeuw, 1632-1704, p. 73-75
- Gerardi Blasii Amstelodamensis Observationes medicae rariores. Accedit Monstri triplicis historia
