= Willem van Oldenbarnevelt =

Dutch noble

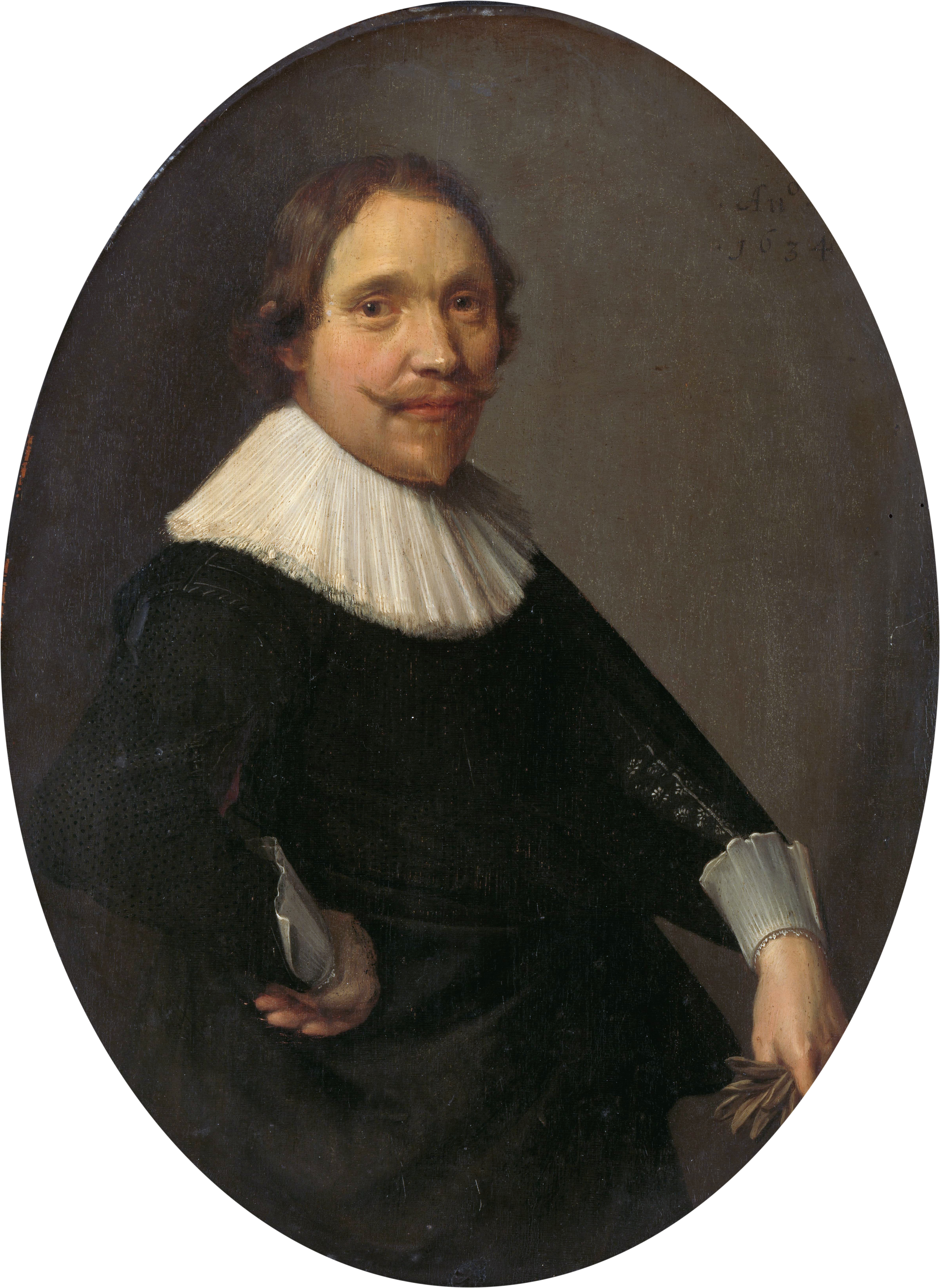
Willem van Oldenbarnevelt, anonymous portrait from 1634

Willem van Oldenbarnevelt, Lord of Stoutenburg (1590 – before 1638) was a son of Johan van Oldenbarnevelt. He was born in The Hague, where he was baptised at the court-chapel in November 1590.

== Biography ==
He first served as a captain of an Overijssel company of the Dutch republican army. He left for Paris in late 1607, together with his brother Reinier van Oldenbarnevelt, for his Grand Tour, an educational journey abroad in order to complete his study at the Dutch university, but also to become familiar with the morals of the higher classes in other countries. The influential ambassador Francis van Aarssens was the guardian of the two young brothers. After only a few weeks into their journey they were invited to the court of King Henry IV of France. Reinier did not stay long in Paris, and soon returned to the Netherlands in order to marry. Willem enjoyed himself in Paris so much with the game Jeu de Paume, that van Aerssen sent worried letters to the Netherlands, writing that Willem was neglecting his mathematics study there. Johan van Oldenbarnevelt was not pleased with this, and he let it be known that he would like to see Willem being given a post at the French court. On August 7, 1608, Willem was appointed a gentleman-ordinary of King Henry IV, which gave him a salary of 3,000 Dutch guilders, a post that was probably given for political reasons. Nonetheless, William remained a passionate fan of Jeu de Paume, and wasted his entire salary at the tennis court.

On May 7, 1611, he was knighted by King James I of England, and a few days later, on May 30, he was made Captain at Bergen op Zoom. On December 22, 1613, he was made a Knight of the Order of the Garter by James I, probably also for political reasons. In 1616, Willem van Oldenbarnevelt married Walburch van Marnix van Sint-Aldegonde, granddaughter of Philip van Marnix van Sint-Aldegonde. He was appointed governor of Bergen op Zoom in 1617 thanks to mediation by his father.

After the execution of his father on May 13, 1619, he was removed from his functions, and was left destitute by the seizure of the possessions of his father, Johan van Oldenbarnevelt. Willem conspired with amongst others his brother Reinier van Oldenbarnevelt and the Remonstrant preacher Hendrick Danielsz Slatius to assassinate Maurice of Orange, who was responsible for the death of his father. They hired a number of sailors for 400 guilders to carry out the attack. The assassination was to take place on February 7, 1623, but the plan leaked out one day early. Reinier van Oldenbarnevelt was arrested and beheaded in The Hague. Willem managed to escape to Brussels, which was controlled by the Spaniards.

Later, letters sent by him to Hugo de Groot were found, which he wrote in the period from January 23, 1626 to December 9, 1633. These letters showed that Willem had hoped to one day return to the Republic, that he had remained a Protestant and had not taken service in the Spanish army. His testament, however, showed that he had become Catholic and had entered service in the Spanish army. His wife had not fled with him to Brussels, but did send him money every year. Willem wrote about this that his wife to her ability sent a yearly pension to her not-used-to-poverty husband.

The date of his death is unknown, but since his wife remarried in 1638, it is believed he died before this date. Some believe that Willem van Oldenbarnevelt had one son, named Pieter Van Stoutenburg, either with his wife, or with another woman while he lived in Brussels.
