= Francis van Aarssens =

Dutch diplomat and statesman (1572–1641)

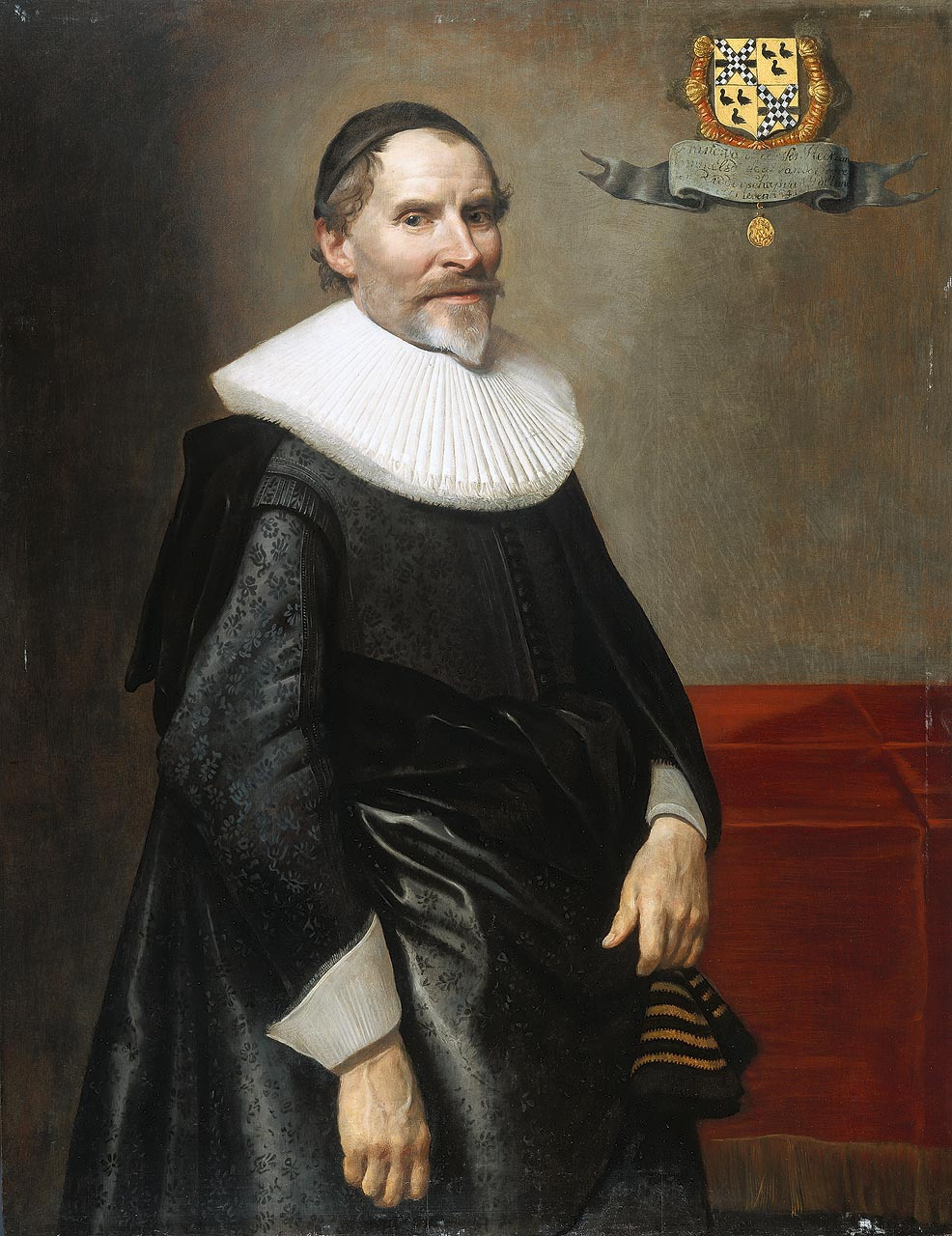
- François van Aerssen by Michiel van Mierevelt
- Born: 27 September 1572; Brussels
- Died: 27 December 1641 (aged 69); The Hague
- Other name: Baron François van Aerssen
- Occupation: diplomat
- Known for: Twelve Years' Truce

Baron Francis van Aarssens or Baron François van Aerssen (27 September 1572 - 27 December 1641), from 1611 on lord of Sommelsdijk, was a diplomat and statesman of the United Provinces.

== Biography ==
He was born in Brussels, the son of Cornelis van Aarsens, also a statesman. His talents commended him to the notice of Advocate Johan van Oldenbarnevelt, who sent him, at the age of 26 years, as a diplomatic agent of the states-general to the court of France. He took a considerable part in the negotiations of the Twelve Years' Truce in 1609.

His conduct of affairs having displeased the French king, he was recalled from his post by Oldenbarneveldt in 1614, after the French ambassador Benjamin Aubery du Maurier had demanded Aarsens' recall. Such was the hatred he henceforth conceived against his former benefactor, that he did his very utmost to effect Oldebarneveldt's ruin. However, he was not a member of the court that convicted Oldenbarnevelt in the Trial of Oldenbarnevelt, Grotius and Hogerbeets, as Chisholm mistakenly reports.

He afterwards became the confidential counselor of Maurice, Prince of Orange, and afterwards of Frederick Henry, Prince of Orange, in their conduct of the foreign affairs of the republic. He was sent on special embassies to Venice, Germany and England, and displayed so much diplomatic skill and finesse that Cardinal Richelieu ranked him among the three greatest politicians of his time. He died, aged 69, in The Hague.
