= Cornelis van Aarsens =

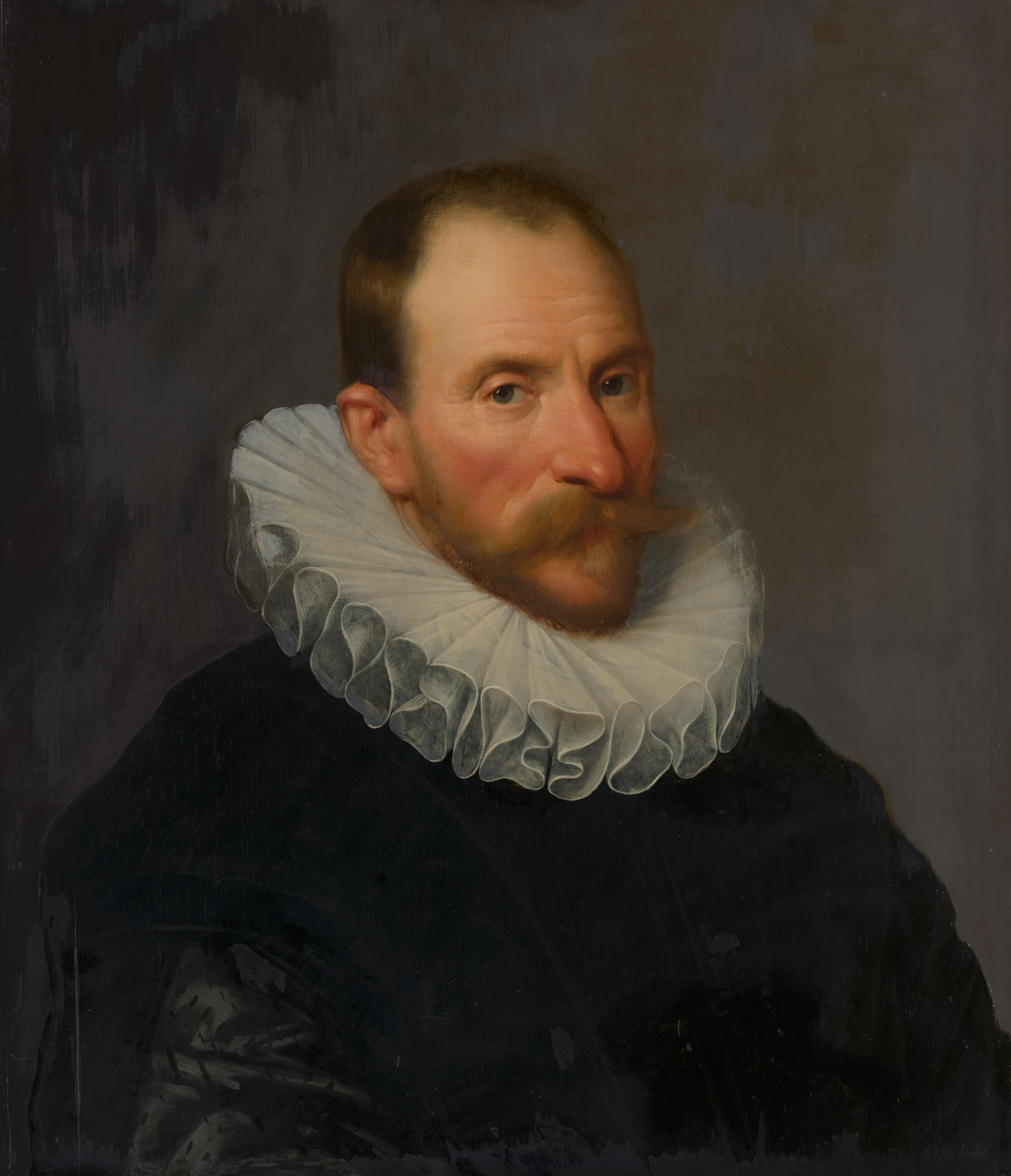
Portrait of Cornelis van Aarsens

Cornelis van Aerssen (also Aerssen, Aersen, Aarsens) (1545 - 22 March 1627) was a statesman in Holland.

Van Aerssen was born in Antwerp. From 1611 he was Heer van Spijk (Lord of Spijk, sometimes spelt Spyck) and was the father of Frans van Aarsens. For many years, he was registrat to the States-General. He died in The Hague.

He was almost certainly the son of an Antwerp courtier, who was favoured by the court at Brussels. Von Aerssen himself in 1574 entered office as a city secretary of Brussels. In the following year he was appointed the pensioner of the city. Although in religious matters he was known as a tolerant man, he was against a reconciliation with Philip II of Spain.

Von Aerssen travelled often, and on the day of the murder of William the Silent, he was also in Den Haag.

In 1584 he was sent with other delegates to France. The goal of this delegation was to negotiate with the French king Henry IV over the sovereignty of Dutch Republic. Cornelis van Aerssen was in the same year appointed an official of the Dutch Estates-General, but continued to live in Brussels, which raised the suspicion that he was plotting with the Spanish. He played a leading role in the Orange-reformed party. When the Spanish general Francisco de Mendoza was in Woerden and Den Haag as a Dutch prisoner after the Battle of Nieuwpoort, and wanted to start peace negotiations, Van Aerssen was named a Dutch representative alongside the Land's Advocate of Holland Johan van Oldenbarnevelt and the Franciscan Johan Meyen sent by Archduke Albrecht. Van Aerssen negotiated with the Spanish envoy, and on 4 May 1602 agreed an 8-month cease-fire. Oldenbarnevelt, at the head of the party aiming for peace, welcomed this, as he feared the growing power of the Dutch Stadtholder Maurice, Prince of Orange.

This article incorporates content from Joseph Thomas's Universal pronouncing dictionary of biography and mythology, a text in the public domain
