= Reinier van Oldenbarnevelt =

Dutch political figure

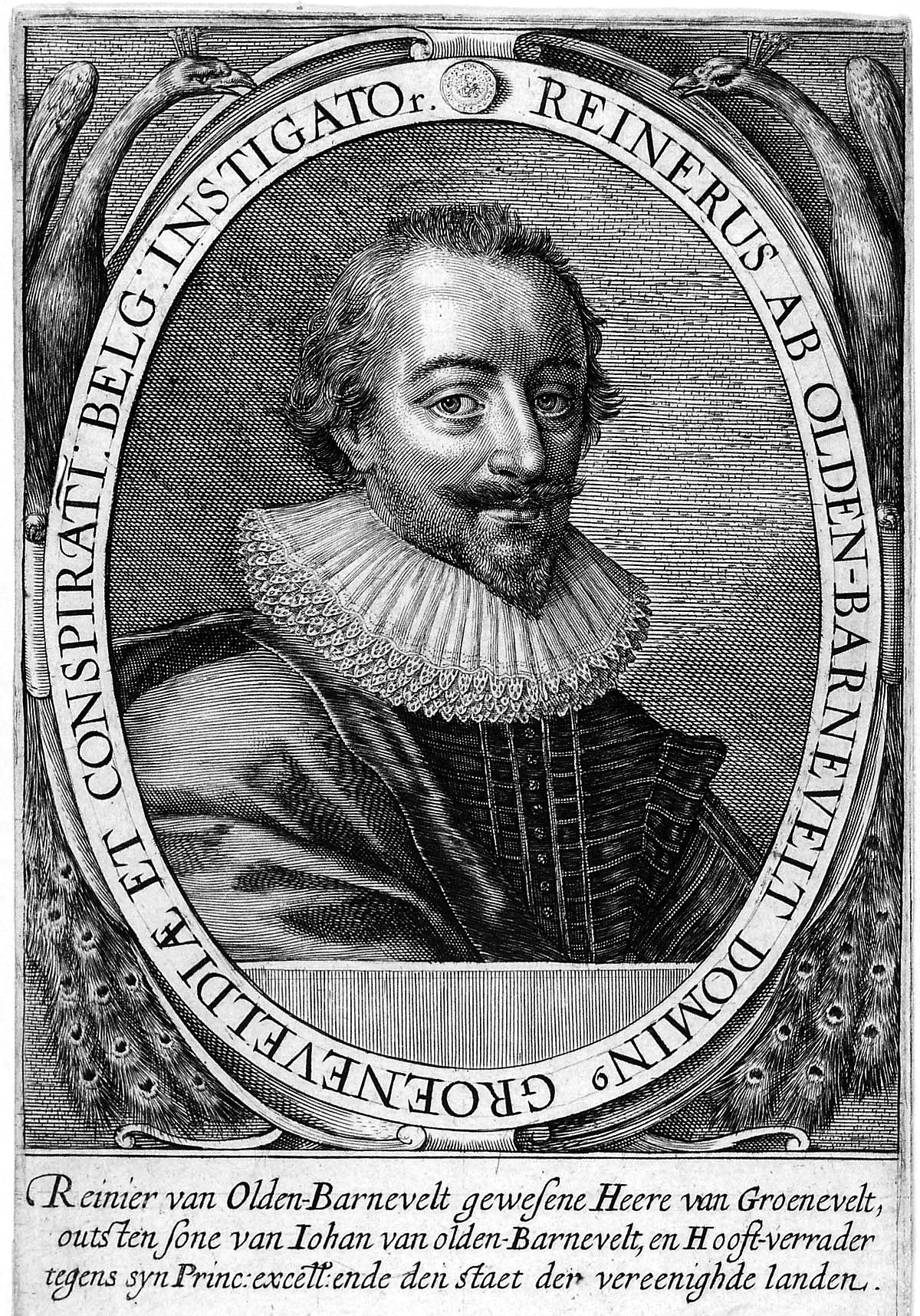
Reinier van Oldenbarnevelt

Reinier van Oldenbarnevelt, lord of Groeneveld, (also known as Reinier van Groeneveld) (c. 1588 – 29 March 1623) was a Dutch political figure.

He was born in Rotterdam, the son of Johan van Oldenbarnevelt. In 1607, he visited Paris with his brother Willem van Oldenbarnevelt as part of their Grand Tour, and they were received at the court of king Henry IV of France. He married Anna Weytsen, lady of Brandwijk and Gijbeland, in Delft in 1608. They had three children; Jacoba Francina (1610), Johan (1612) and Jacob van Oldenbarnevelt (1614). Reinier became forester of Holland and lived in the Slot Teylingen at Voorhout.

After the execution of his father in 1619, Reinier conspired with his brother Willem van Oldenbarnevelt and amongst others the Remonstrant preacher Hendrick Danielsz Slatius to assassinate stadtholder Maurice of Orange. The assassination attempt failed however, and Reinier van Oldenbarnevelt was beheaded in 1623 in The Hague (as his father had been) for financial complicity in the conspiracy to assassinate prince Maurice. His wife Anna remarried in 1625, to Jacob Westerbaen.

== Sources ==
- Molhuysen, P.C. en P.J. Blok, Nieuw Nederlandsch biografisch woordenboek: deel 5; Oldenbarnevelt, Reinier van
