= Johan van Oldenbarnevelt =

Dutch statesman and revolutionary (1547–1619)

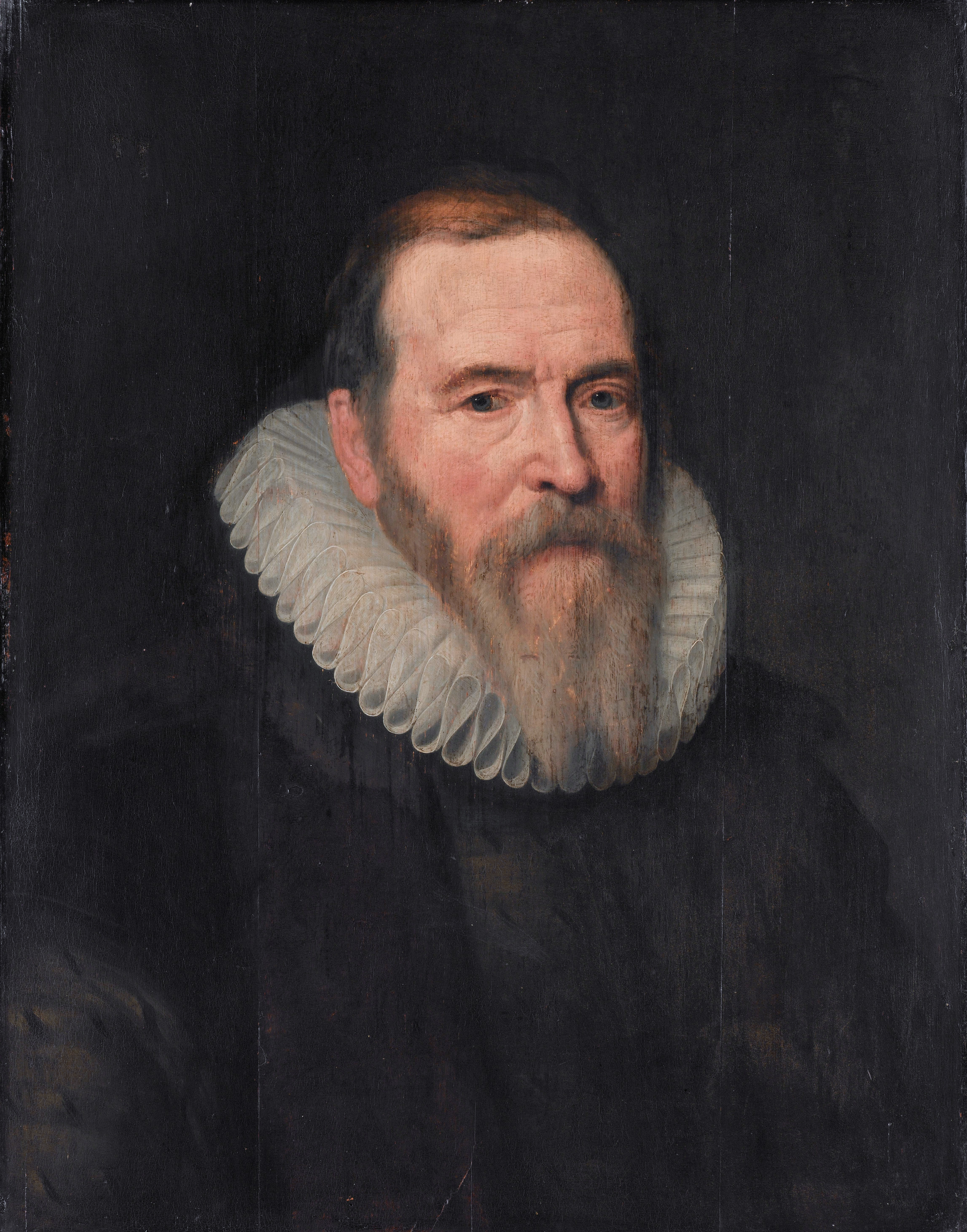
- Portrait c. 1616

Grand Pensionary of Holland
- In office 1586 – 1619
- Preceded by: Paulus Buys
- Succeeded by: Andries de Witt

Pensionary of Rotterdam
- In office 1576 – 1586

Personal details
- Born: 14 September 1547 Amersfoort, Spanish Netherlands
- Died: 13 May 1619 (aged 71) The Hague, Dutch Republic
- Spouse: Maria van Utrecht (m. 1575)
- Children: 5, including Reinier van Oldenbarnevelt and Willem van Oldenbarnevelt
- Education: University of Leuven; University of Bourges; University of Cologne; Heidelberg University; University of Padua

Johan van Oldenbarnevelt (Dutch pronunciation: [ˈjoːɦɑɱ vɑn ɔldə(m)ˈbɑrnəvɛlt]; 14 September 1547 – 13 May 1619), Heer van Berkel en Rodenrijs (1600), Gunterstein (1611) and Bakkum (1613), was a Dutch statesman and revolutionary who played an important role in the Dutch struggle for independence from Spain.

Van Oldenbarnevelt was born in Amersfoort. He studied law at the universities of Leuven, Bourges, Heidelberg, and Padua, and traveled in France and Italy before settling permanently in The Hague. He favored William the Silent in his revolt against Philip II of Spain, and fought in William's army. In his later years he was a supporter of the Arminians during the religious-political controversy which split the young Dutch Republic. He was the founder of the Dutch East India Company.

== Early political life ==
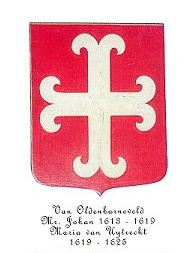
Coat of arms of the Oldenbarneveld family

Van Oldenbarnevelt served as a volunteer for the relief of Haarlem (1573) and again at Leiden (1574). He was married in 1575 to Maria van Utrecht. In 1576 he obtained the important post of pensionary of Rotterdam, an office which carried with it official membership of the States of Holland. In this capacity his industry, singular grasp of affairs, and persuasive powers of speech speedily gained for him a position of influence. He was active in promoting the Union of Utrecht (1579) and the offer of the countship of Holland and Zeeland to William the Silent (prevented by William’s death in 1584). He was a fierce opponent of the policies of the Earl of Leicester, the governor‐general at the time, and instead favoured Maurice of Nassau, a son of William. Leicester left in 1587, leaving the military power in the Netherlands to Maurice. During the governorship of Leicester, Van Oldenbarnevelt was the leader of the strenuous opposition offered by the States of Holland to the centralizing policy of the governor.

== Land's Advocate ==
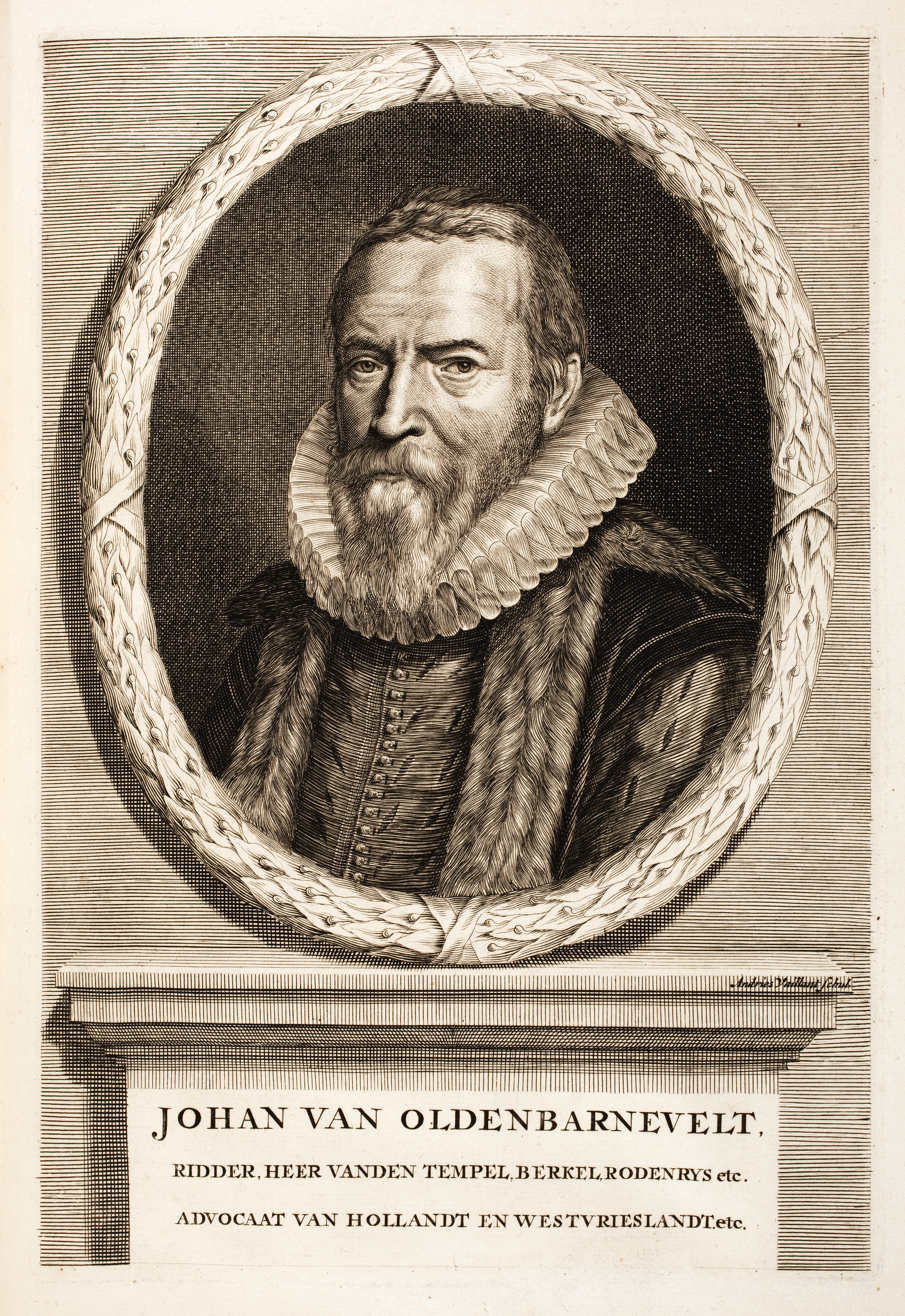
Engraving of Johan van Oldenbarnevelt

On 16 March 1586, Van Oldenbarnevelt, in succession to Paulus Buys, became Land's Advocate of Holland for the States of Holland and West Friesland, an office he held for 32 years. This great office, given to a man of commanding ability and industry, offered unbounded influence in a multi-headed republic without any central executive authority. Though nominally the servant of the States of Holland, Van Oldenbarnevelt made himself the political personification of the province which bore more than half the entire charge of the union. As mouthpiece of the ridderschap (College of Nobles), with one vote in the States of Holland, he practically dominated that assembly. In a brief period, he became entrusted with such large and far-reaching authority in all details of administration, that he became the virtual Prime minister of the Dutch republic.

During the two critical years following the withdrawal of Leicester, the Advocate's statesmanship kept the United Provinces from collapsing under their own inherent separatist tendencies. This prevented the United Provinces from becoming an easy conquest for the formidable army of Alexander of Parma. Also of good fortune for the Netherlands, the attention of Philip II of Spain was at its greatest weakness, instead focused on a contemplated invasion of England. Spain's lack of attention coupled with the United Province's lack of central, organized government allowed Van Oldenbarnevelt to gain control of administrative affairs. His task was made easier by receiving whole-hearted support from Maurice of Nassau, who, after 1589, held the office of Stadholderate of five provinces. He was also Captain-General and Admiral of the Union.

The interests and ambitions of Van Oldenbarnevelt and Maurice did not clash. Indeed, Maurice's thoughts were centered on training and leading armies, and he had no special capacity as a statesman or desire for politics. Their first rift came in 1600, when Maurice was forced against his will by the States-General, under the Advocate's influence, to undertake a military expedition to Flanders. The expedition was saved from disaster by desperate efforts that ended in victory at the Battle of Nieuwpoort.

After 1598, Van Oldenbarnevelt took part in special diplomatic missions to King Henry IV of France and Queen Elizabeth I of England, and again in 1605 in a special mission sent to congratulate King James I of England on his accession. He initiated and brokered the action that founded the Dutch East India Company (VOC) amalgamating half a dozen companies that traded on the Far East (the first from 1595) into one in 1602. The VOC would trade for two centuries. In 1612 the VOC developed the model for the corporation of using joint stock ownership by share holders, who could only get their investment back by selling its shares at a stock exchange, also an Oldenbarnevelt initiative. The basic principle of the model was over time adopted worldwide.

As the leader of the delegation of Holland in the States-General Oldenbarnevelt also dominated Dutch diplomacy. He led the negotiations with the Spanish Crown which led to the Twelve Years' Truce in 1609. This increased the rift with Maurice, who was opposed to the truce. Contrary to Maurice, Van Oldenbarnevelt was also in favour of provinces retaining their autonomy.

== Religious conflict in the Netherlands ==
The immediate effect of the truce was a strengthening of Van Oldenbarnevelt's influence in the government of the Dutch Republic, now recognized as a free and independent state; external peace, however, was to bring with it internal strife. For some years there had been a war of words between the religious parties, the strict Calvinist Gomarists (or Contra-Remonstrants) and the Arminians.

In 1610 the Arminians, henceforth known as Remonstrants, drew up a petition, known as the Remonstrance, in which they asked that their tenets (defined in the Five Articles of Remonstrance) should be submitted to a national synod, summoned by the civil government. It was no secret that this action by the Arminians was taken with the approval and connivance of Van Oldenbarnevelt, who was an upholder of the principle of religious toleration.

The Gomarists in reply drew up a Contra-Remonstrance in seven articles, and called for a purely church synod. The Dutch Reformed Church was immediately divided into Remonstrants and Contra-Remonstrants; the States of Holland under the influence of Van Oldenbarnevelt supported the former (Remonstrants), and refused to sanction the summoning of a purely church synod (1613). They likewise (1614) forbade the preachers in the Province of Holland to treat the disputed subjects from their pulpits.

Obedience was difficult to enforce without military help. Riots broke out in certain towns, exacerbated by social tensions due to worsening economic conditions. When Prince Maurice was appealed to, as Captain-General of the Republic, he at first declined to act. Though in no sense a theologian, he then declared himself on the side of the Contra-Remonstrants, and established a preacher of that persuasion in a church in The Hague (1617). This placed Maurice and Van Oldenbarnevelt on opposite sides of the divide.

== Holland declares sovereign independence (Scherpe Resolutie) ==
The Advocate now took a bold step. He proposed that the States of Holland should, on their own authority, as a sovereign province, raise a local force of 4000 men (waardgelders) to keep the peace.

The States-General, meanwhile, by a bare majority (4 provinces to 3) agreed to the summoning of a national church synod. The States of Holland, also by a narrow majority, refused their assent to this, and passed, on 4 August 1617, a strong resolution (Scherpe Resolutie) by which all magistrates, officials and soldiers in the pay of the province were, on pain of dismissal, required to take an oath of obedience to the States of Holland and to be held accountable not to the ordinary tribunals but to the States of Holland.

The States‐General of the Republic saw it as a declaration of sovereign independence on the part of Holland and decided to take action. A commission was appointed, with Maurice at its head, to compel the disbanding of the waardgelders. On 31 July 1618, the Stadholder, at the head of a body of troops, appeared at Utrecht, which had thrown in its lot with Holland. At his order the local militias laid down their arms. His progress through the towns of Holland met with no military opposition. The States party was crushed without a battle being fought.

== Arrest and trial ==
On 29 August 1618, by order of the States-General, Van Oldenbarnevelt and his chief supporters, Hugo Grotius, Gilles van Ledenberg, and Rombout Hogerbeets, and others were arrested or lost their political positions in government. His arrest was supported by Maurice. Van Oldenbarnevelt was, with his friends, kept in strict confinement until November of that year, and then brought for examination before a commission appointed by the States-General, led by Reynier Pauw. He appeared more than 60 times before the commissioners and the whole course of his official life was severely examined. During the period of inquest, he was neither allowed to consult papers nor put his defense in writing.

On 20 February 1619, Van Oldenbarnevelt was arraigned before a special court of twenty-four members, only half of whom were Hollanders, and nearly all of whom were personal enemies. This ad hoc judicial commission was necessary, because, unlike in the individual provinces, the federal government did not have a judicial branch. Normally the accused would be brought before the Hof van Holland or the Hoge Raad van Holland en Zeeland, the highest courts in the provinces of Holland and Zeeland; however, in this case, the alleged crime was against the Generaliteit, or federal government, and required adjudication by the States-General, acting as the highest court in the land. As was customary in similar cases (for instance, the later trial of the judges in the case of the Amboyna massacre), the trial was delegated to a commission. Of course, the accused contested the competence of the court, as they contested the residual sovereignty of the States-General, but their protest was disregarded.

== Death and legacy ==
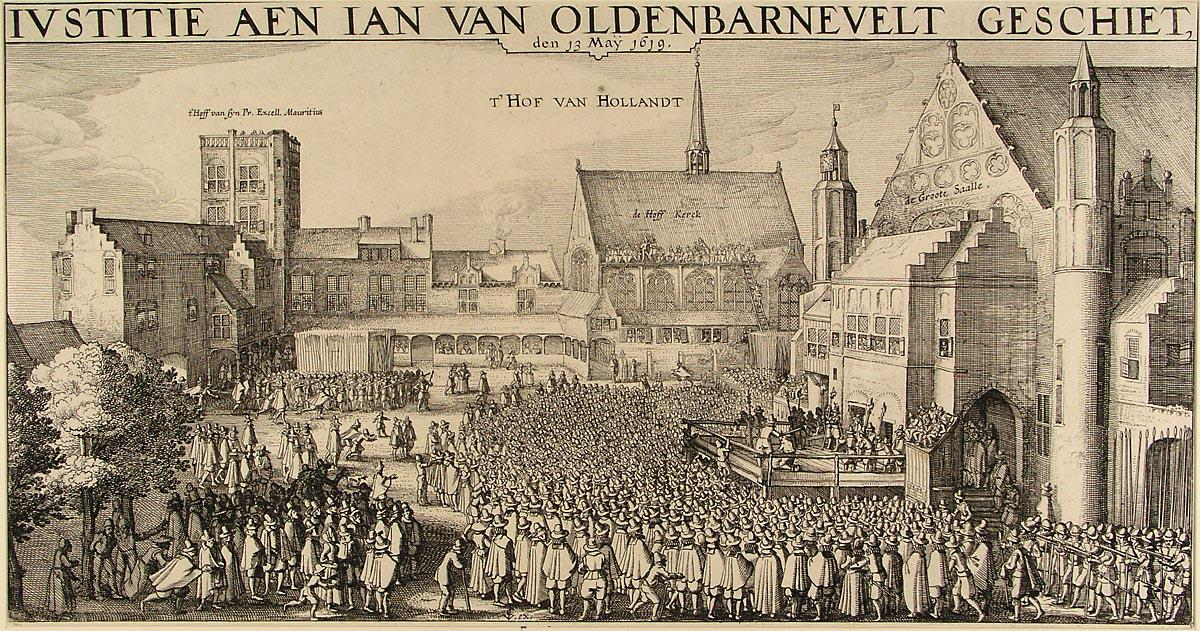
Engraving depicting Van Oldenbarnevelt's execution

The stacked bench of judges decided the verdict on Saturday 11 May 1619 and it was announced on Sunday afternoon. Attempts to obtain a pardon, or at least a commutation of the sentence of death, were made by Maurice's stepmother, Louise de Coligny, and the French ambassador Benjamin Aubery du Maurier, but it was in vain. On Monday, 13 May 1619, the death sentence was read to Van Oldenbarnevelt; and, therefore, on the same morning, the old statesman, at the age of seventy-one, was beheaded in the Binnenhof, in The Hague. His last words to the gathered crowd were: "Men, do not believe I am a traitor; I have acted sincerely and piously, as a good patriot, and I shall die this way." Van Oldenbarnevelt's last words to the executioner were purportedly: "Make it short, make it short." He was buried under the Court Chapel (Hofkapel) at the Binnenhof.

During Van Oldenbarnevelt's captivity, his servant Jan Francken kept a diary, forty pages long at the time of his execution; a copy was made by a pastor, the Rev Adrian Stolker, in 1825 for wider dissemination, but the original then disappeared until it was rediscovered in 2018 in Van Oldenbarnevelt's home city of Amersfoort.

Van Oldenbarnevelt left two sons: Reinier van Oldenbarnevelt, lord of Groeneveld, and Willem van Oldenbarnevelt, lord of Stoutenburg, and two daughters. A conspiracy against the life of Maurice, in which both sons of Van Oldenbarnevelt took part, was discovered in 1623. Stoutenburg, who was the chief accomplice, made his escape and entered the service of Spain; Groeneveld was executed.

In London, The Tragedy of Sir John van Olden Barnavelt, a Jacobean play by John Fletcher and Philip Massinger, was written and produced within three months of its protagonist's execution. Being controversial in terms of English as well as Dutch politics, it suffered considerable censorship before being allowed on the stage.

== Health ==
Until 1612, van Oldenbarnevelt was rarely ill. He sometimes suffered, especially in 1610 and 1611, from gout and third-day fever or malaria tertiana. In February 1613 he fell during a visit to Huis Westcamp, which meant that he had to miss out for two weeks. At the age of seventy, he began to walk worse on stairs, and had rheumatic complaints. From 1617 he started walking with his iconic "stockske" (walking stick).

== Namesakes ==
- The Nederland Line ship Johan van Oldenbarnevelt carried his name from 1930 to 1963.
- The school that he attended in Amersfoort, the former "Latin School", was also named after him, and still exists as the "Stedelijk Gymnasium Johan van Oldenbarnevelt".
- The Dutch fort on the Bacan Islands in the Moluccas in the 1600s was named for him. Furthermore, several streets and squares have been named after Johan van Oldenbarnevelt.
- Streets and squares named after van Oldenbarnevelt can be found in many Dutch cities, including Amsterdam, Rotterdam, Utrecht, Middenbeemster, and Bergen op Zoom.

== See also ==
- Johan de Witt
- Synod of Dordrecht
- Sir John van Olden Barnavelt, a 1619 play for the Globe Theatre.

Political offices
Preceded by Paulus Buys	Land's Advocate of Holland; 1586–1619	Succeeded by Andries de Witt as Grand Pensionary
