= Remonstrants =

Dutch Reformed followers of Arminianism

- Classification: Protestant
- Theology: Arminianism
- Origin: early 17th century Netherlands
- Separated from: Dutch Reformed Church
- Official website: www.remonstranten.nl/engels/

The Remonstrants (or the Remonstrant Brotherhood) are a Protestant movement that split from the Dutch Reformed Church in the early 17th century. The early Remonstrants supported Jacobus Arminius, and after his death, continued to maintain his original views, called Arminianism, against the proponents of Calvinism. Condemned by the synod of Dort (1618–1619), the Remonstrants remained a small minority in the Netherlands. In the middle of the 19th century, the Remonstrant Brotherhood was influenced by the liberal Dutch theological movement.

== History ==
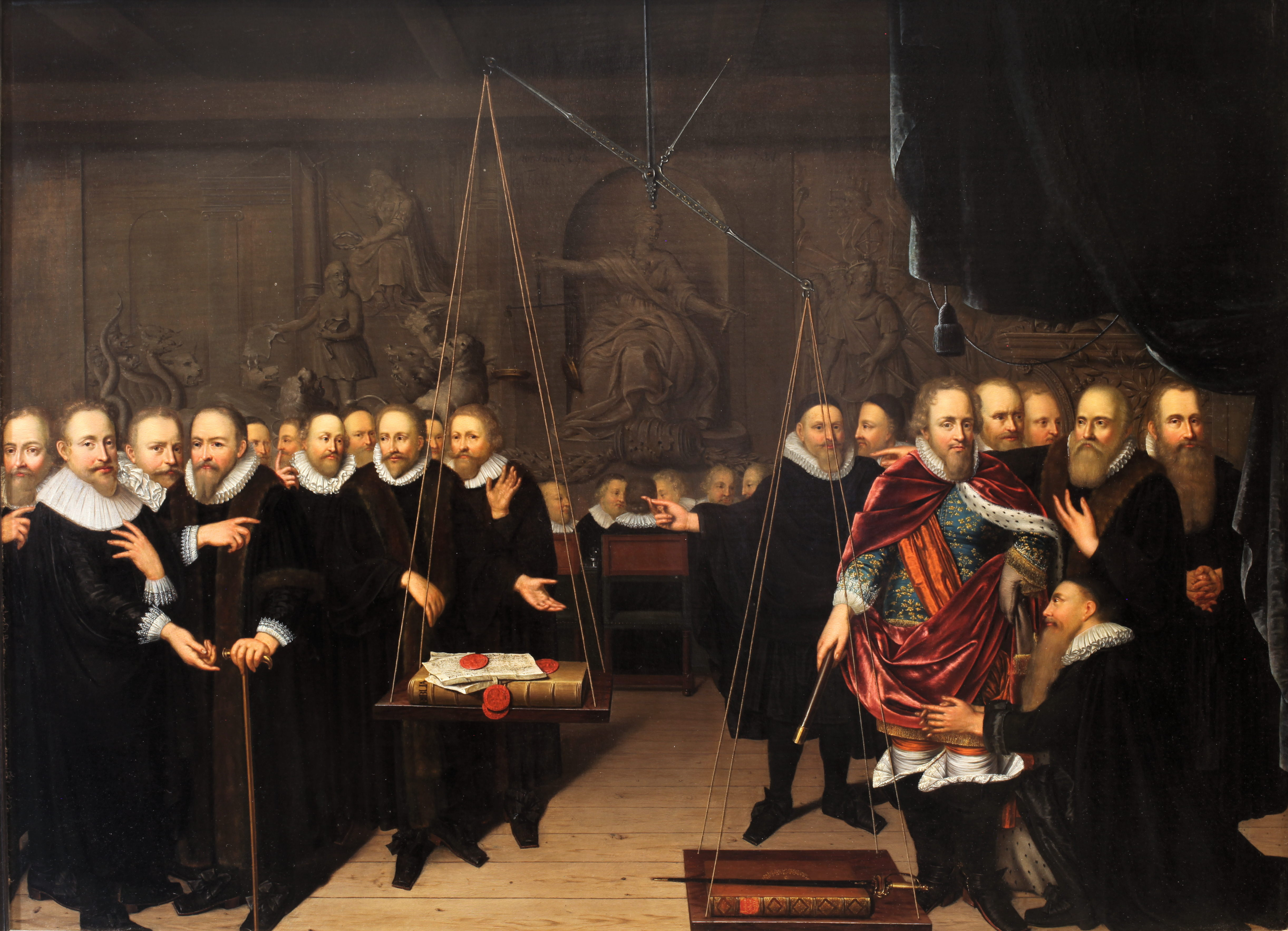
Allegory of the theological dispute between the Arminianists and their opponents by Abraham van der Eyk, 1721. Remonstrants can be seen on the left, while their Dutch Reformed opponents can be seen on the right. The scales shows the Calvinist cause as heavier than the Arminian one, but it has a sword on it. The sword symbolizes state support granted the Dutch Reformed Church by the Republic.

=== Foundation ===
In formulating Arminianism, Jacobus Arminius disagreed with Calvin, especially on predestination. He defended free examination as superior to the doctrines of established churches.

In 1610, Arminius's followers presented to the States of Holland and Friesland the Five Articles of Remonstrance formulating their points of disagreement with Calvinism as adopted by the Dutch Reformed Church. Supporters of Arminius were called "Remonstrants", but they were also called "Arminians".

Their adversaries, inspired by Franciscus Gomarus, became known as Gomarists or Counter-Remonstrants. Although the States General issued an edict tolerating both parties and forbidding further dispute, the conflict continued and became linked to political conflicts in the Dutch Republic. The Remonstrants were assailed both by personal enemies and by the political weapons of Maurice of Orange. Their foremost ally, Johan van Oldenbarnevelt, was executed, and other leaders were imprisoned. In Amsterdam, as in various other cities, the city government was purged of Oldenbarnevelt supporters; Jacob Dircksz de Graeff and Cornelis Hooft fell victim to this action.

In 1618–1619 the Synod of Dordrecht, after expelling the thirteen Arminian pastors headed by Simon Episcopius, established the victory of the Calvinist school. It drew up ninety-three canonical rules, and confirmed the authority of the Belgic Confession and the Heidelberg Catechism. The judgement of the synod was enforced through the deposition and in some cases banishment of Remonstrant ministers. In this context, owing to the lack of preachers, there originated in Warmond a movement in favor of the lay sermon, the adherents of which founded the Society of Collegiants. An exile community of Remonstrants was founded in Antwerp in 1619. In 1621 they were allowed to settle in Schleswig, where they built the town of Friedrichstadt.

=== Institutionalization ===
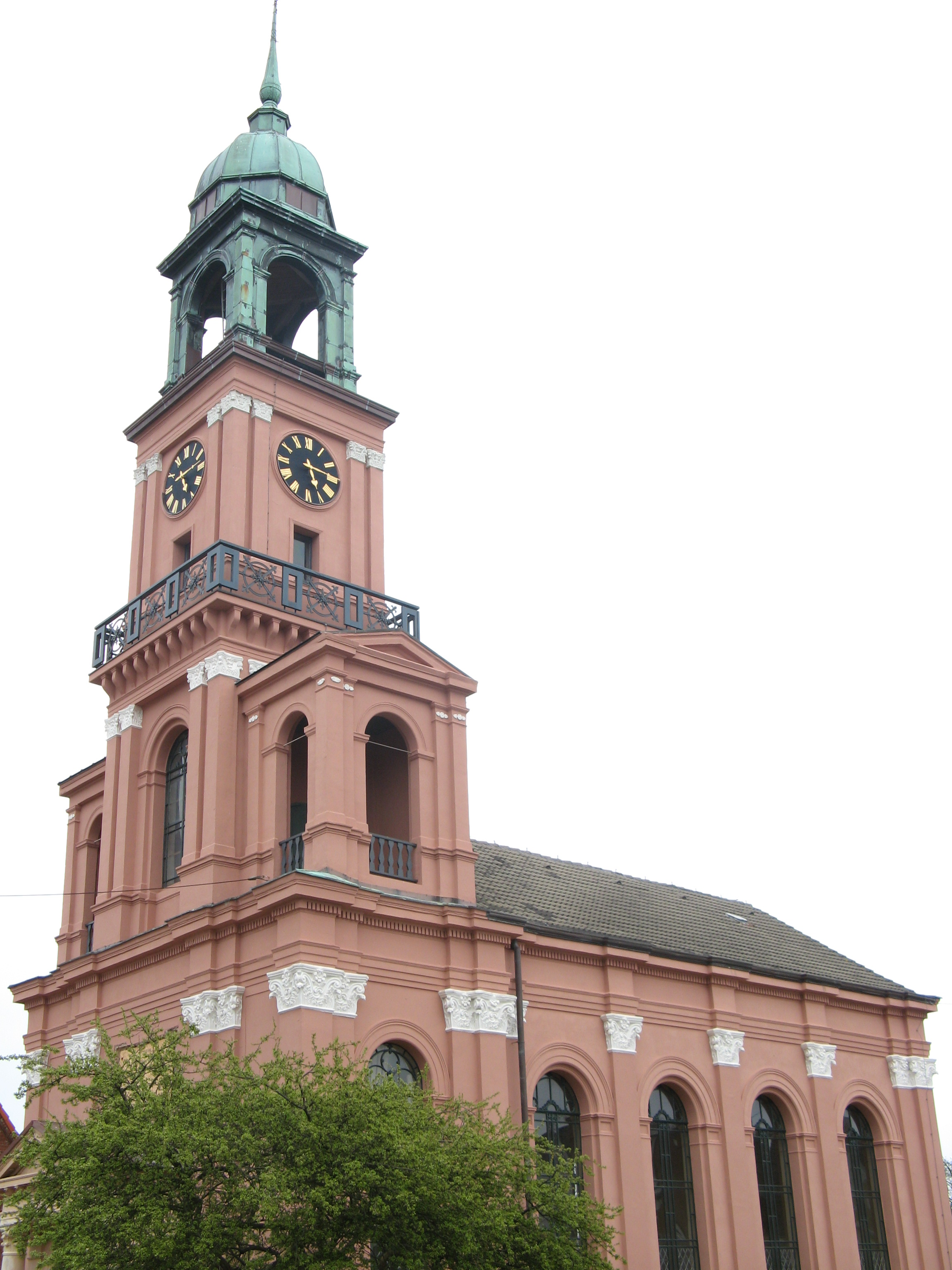
Remonstrant church of Friedrichstadt, Germany

The doctrine of the Remonstrants was embodied in 1621 in a Confession written by Episcopius, their major theologian. This Confession serves as a base for the Remonstrant church since his return to the Netherlands in 1626. It confirms the opinion of the remonstrants already expressed in 1618.

Jan Uytenbogaert gave to the Remonstrants a catechism and regulated their church order. Their seminary in Amsterdam had distinguished pupils, including Curcellaeus, Limborch, Wetstein, and Le Clerc. Their school of theology, which grew more liberal and even rationalistic, forcefully debated the official Dutch Reformed state church and other Christian denominations.

After the death of Maurice of Orange in 1625, some exiles returned. The government became convinced that they posed no danger to the state, and in 1630 they were formally allowed to reside again in all parts of the Republic. They were not, however, officially allowed to build churches until the establishment of the Batavian Republic in 1795. Until then they held their services in so-called Schuilkerken (house churches).

=== Liberalism ===
In the mid-19th century, the Remonstrant Brotherhood was influenced by liberalism, which in the Netherlands was embodied by Petrus Hofstede de Groot (1802–1886). His theology had a wide audience in Europe, which is characteristic of the romantic phase of Christian humanism; in the Netherlands, this line of thought has been represented by the "theologians of Groningen" since 1830.

=== Early Remonstrants’ theological legacy ===
Most of the early Remonstrants followed classical Arminianism. However, they are not the only Protestants who can be considered Arminian or who are called Arminians. Arminianism is a minority within the Reformed confession, but it really belongs to the larger, cross-denominational current of synergism, that is to say, historic, majority Christianity. As Arminianism, it made inroads into the Church of England. As a broader synergism, it appears in Methodism, the General Baptists, the Adventist Church, the Holiness movement, Pentecostalism, the Charismatic movement, and a number of other Protestant denominations.

== Modern Remonstrant Brotherhood ==
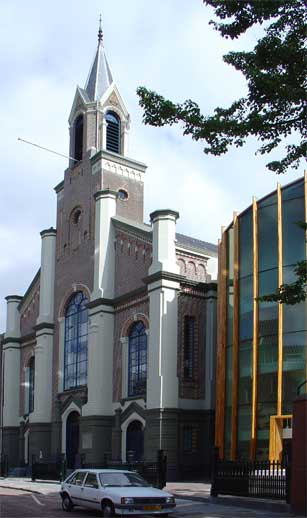
A Remonstrant church in Groningen, Netherlands

=== The church ===
The Remonstrant Brotherhood continues as a church in the Netherlands. The Remonstrants first received official recognition in 1795. Their chief congregation has been in Rotterdam.

In 2016, the Remonstrant Brotherhood has about 5,000 members and "friends", in more than 40 congregations in the Netherlands, and one congregation in Friedrichstadt, in northern Germany (2008).

The Remonstrant Brotherhood of The Netherlands keeps fellowship with the European Liberal Protestant Network, and is a full, charter member of the World Alliance of Reformed Churches. It is also a member of the Communion of Protestant Churches in Europe.

Whereas the early twentieth-century professor of Remonstrant theology Herman Ysbrand Groenewegen was a vocal opponent of homosexual emancipation, by contrast, in 1986 the Brotherhood, becoming the first Christian denomination in Europe, officially allowed the blessing of same-sex partnerships, on an equal footing with heterosexual marriage. This decision was taken well before civil marriage was opened up to same-sex couples. Moreover, Church weddings have no legal status in the Netherlands.

Remonstrants emphasize personal faith and are not necessarily in agreement with one another on questions of faith and social issues. They consider that the message of the Gospel cannot be separated from true choices in the struggle to live together, on the road to a world with peace and justice. What binds them is the Statement of Principle:

The Remonstrant Church is a community of faith which, rooted in the gospel of Jesus Christ, and true to its principle of freedom and tolerance, seeks to worship and serve God.

=== Confessions of faith ===
In addition to the Statement of Principle, most contemporary Remonstrants write their own declaration or profession of faith when they become a member of the community. The brotherhood did express at three times in their history the faith they share in a confessional statement, in 1621, 1940 and 2006. Remonstrants however, being a non-creedal denomination, consider no confession to have indisputable authority.

== Sources ==
- Benedict, Philip (2008). Christ's Churches Purely Reformed: A Social History of Calvinism. Yale University Press. ISBN 978-0300127225.
- De Jong, Peter (1968). "The Opinions of the Remonstrants (1618)". Crisis in the Reformed Churches: Essays in Commemoration of the Great Synod of Dordt, 1618–1619 (PDF). Grand Rapids: Reformed Fellowship.
- Episcopius, Simon; Ellis, Mark A. (2005). The Arminian confession of 1621 (PDF). Eugene: Pickwick Publications.
- nu.nl (2011). "Kerken komen uit de kast in boek" (in Dutch). nu.nl.
- LBR (2019). "Belijdenis" (in Dutch). Landelijk Bureau Remonstranten.
- LBR (2015). "Remonstrant Church". Landelijk Bureau Remonstranten.
- LBR (2016). "Deel 2 Commissie tot de Zaken – Activiteiten" (PDF) (in Dutch). Landelijk Bureau Remonstranten.
- Olson, Roger E. (2012). "Who Is (or Might Be) an Arminian?". Roger E. Olson: My evangelical, Arminian theological musings. Patheos.
- Trouw.nl (2010). "Remonstranten en Boomsma krijgen homo-emancipatieprijs" (in Dutch). Trouw.nl.
- Schaff, Philip; Herzog, Jakob (1953). "Remonstrants". The New Schaff-Herzog Encyclopedia of Religious Knowledge. Vol. 9. Grand Rapids: Baker.
- Zijpp, Nanne van der (1959). "Remonstrants". Global Anabaptist Mennonite Encyclopedia Online.
