= Katwijk aan den Rijn =

- Town
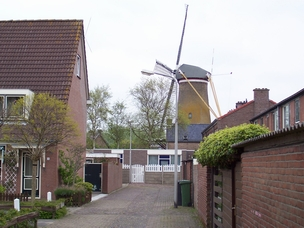
- View on the grist mill De Geregtigheid

- Location in the province of South Holland in the Netherlands Location in the Netherlands
- Coordinates: 52.1961°N 4.42472°E
- Country: Netherlands
- Province: South Holland
- Municipality: Katwijk

Area
  - Total: 2.19 km^{2} (0.85 sq mi)
- Elevation: 1.0 m (3.3 ft)

Population (2021)
  - Total: 11,460
  - Density: 5,230/km^{2} (13,600/sq mi)
- Time zone: UTC+1 (CET)
  - Summer (DST): UTC+2 (CEST)
- Postal code: 2223 & 2224
- Dialing code: 071

Katwijk aan den Rijn (Katwijk on the Rhine) is a town in the municipality of Katwijk in the province of South Holland, in The Netherlands, with approximately 6020 inhabitants. Katwijk aan den Rijn lies between Katwijk aan Zee, Valkenburg and Rijnsburg. It actually forms a unit with all of these other centres.

== History ==
Katwijk aan den Rijn is located near the mouth of the Oude Rijn. The village's name first appeared in the official documents in 1231. At that time, Floris IV, Count of Holland, had his residence there. The village itself had been established about a century earlier. In 1388 the village lost its fish market to the growing village of Katwijk aan Zee. The two places then were within the same seigniory (heerlijkheid). In the early days, Katwijk aan Zee was a fishing village while Katwijk aan den Rijn was more agricultural. Initially the two villages were separate, but over the course of time, they grew and eventually merged. Both villages have retained their own identity.

== Katwijk aan den Rijn today ==
The municipal government house is now located in Katwijk aan de Rijn, on the border with Katwijk aan Zee. De Molenwijk in Katwijk aan den Rijn, with many flats or apartments, was greatly changed in the 1980s. Many old flats were demolished and a new flat, the Molenburgh, was built, as well as many single-family homes. A number of flats were also renovated, such as the flat on Tulpstraat (Tulip Street) with a number of shops at ground level including the well-known café, the Wachtje (little sentry or look-out). The district Cleijn Duin, according to the municipality of Katwijk, also lies in Katwijk aan den Rijn, although common opinion is divided. The highway N206 was often seen as the dividing line between Katwijk aan Zee and Katwijk aan den Rijn.

== Places of interest ==
Dorpskerk Church has towers and choir dating from about 1300. The nave dates from the middle of the 15th century. Within the church is the tomb of Willem van Lyere en Maria van Reigersberg (1663), a principal work of Rombout Verhulst, and an organ (1765) in Rococo style. Johannes de Doperkerk is a Roman Catholic church from 1846. The flour mill Korenmolen De Geregtigheid is a brick tower mill from 1740.

The main road in Katwijk aan den Rijn is the Rijnstraat. Every year in the last week of August there is an autumn festival. There is a fair. In 2015 there was a temporary train in the Rijnstraat.

De schutter (man on horse) is an equestrian statue by G.Brouwer, 1986.

== Gallery ==
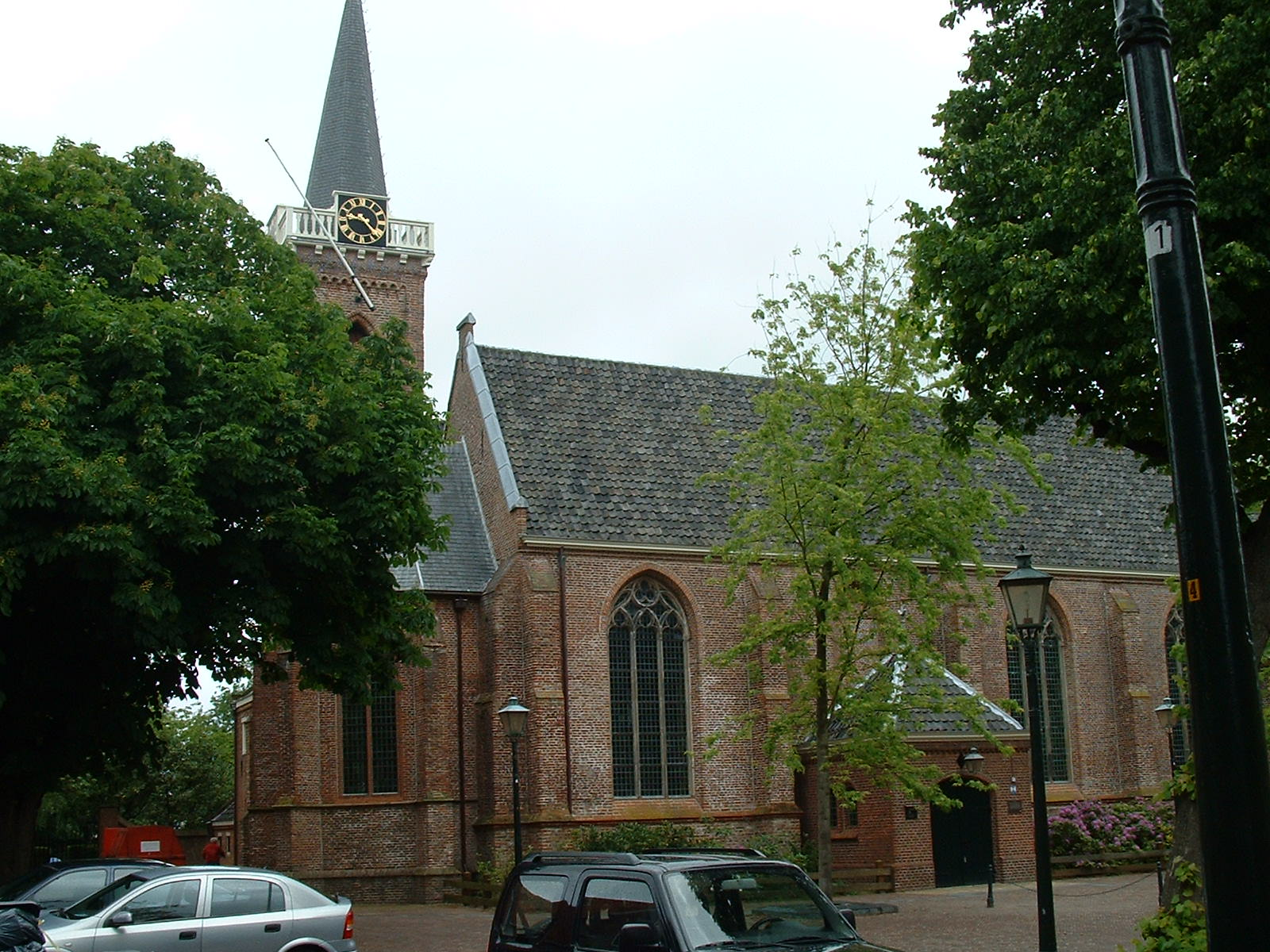
Dorpskerk

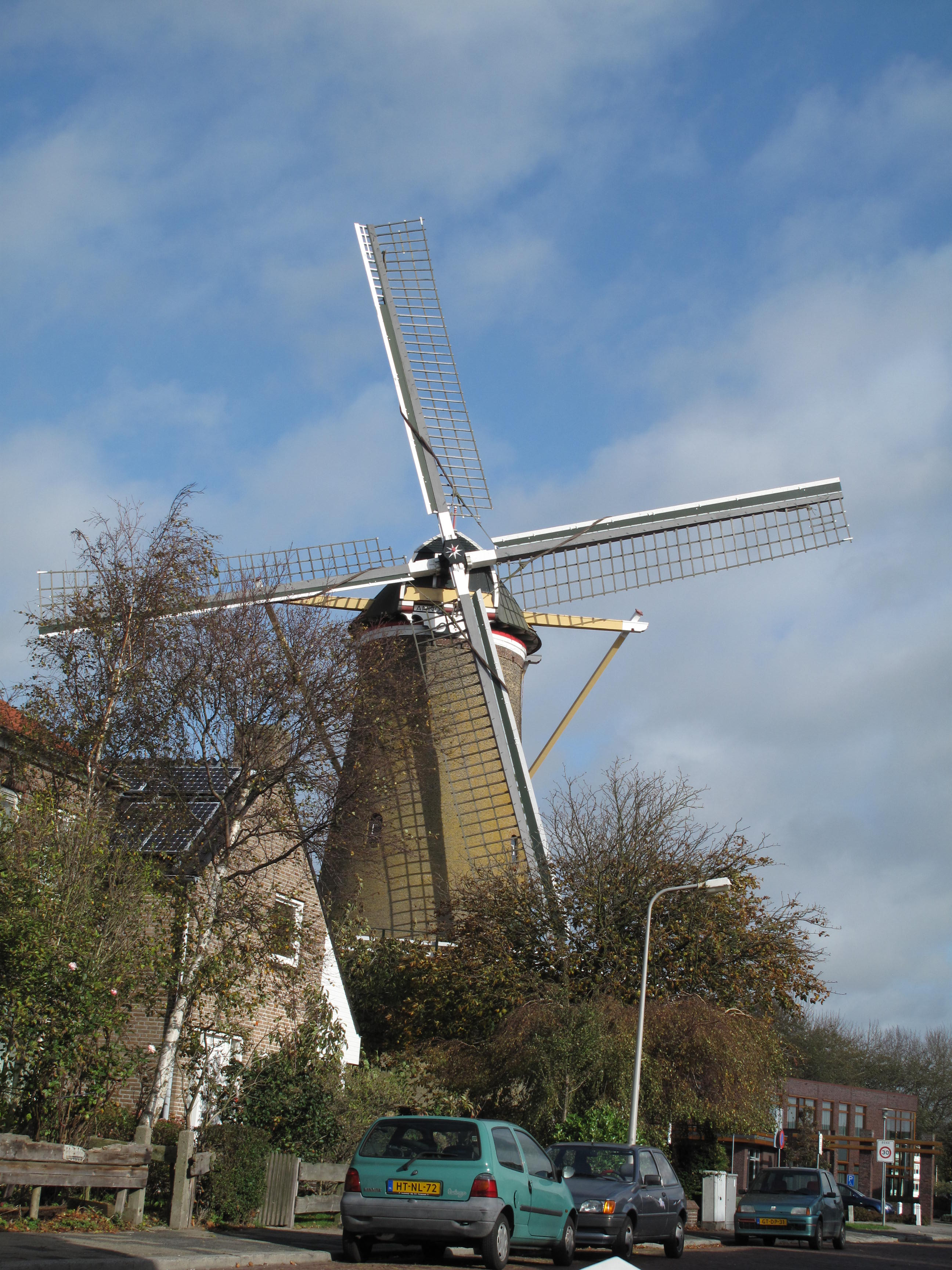
windmill: de Geregtigheid

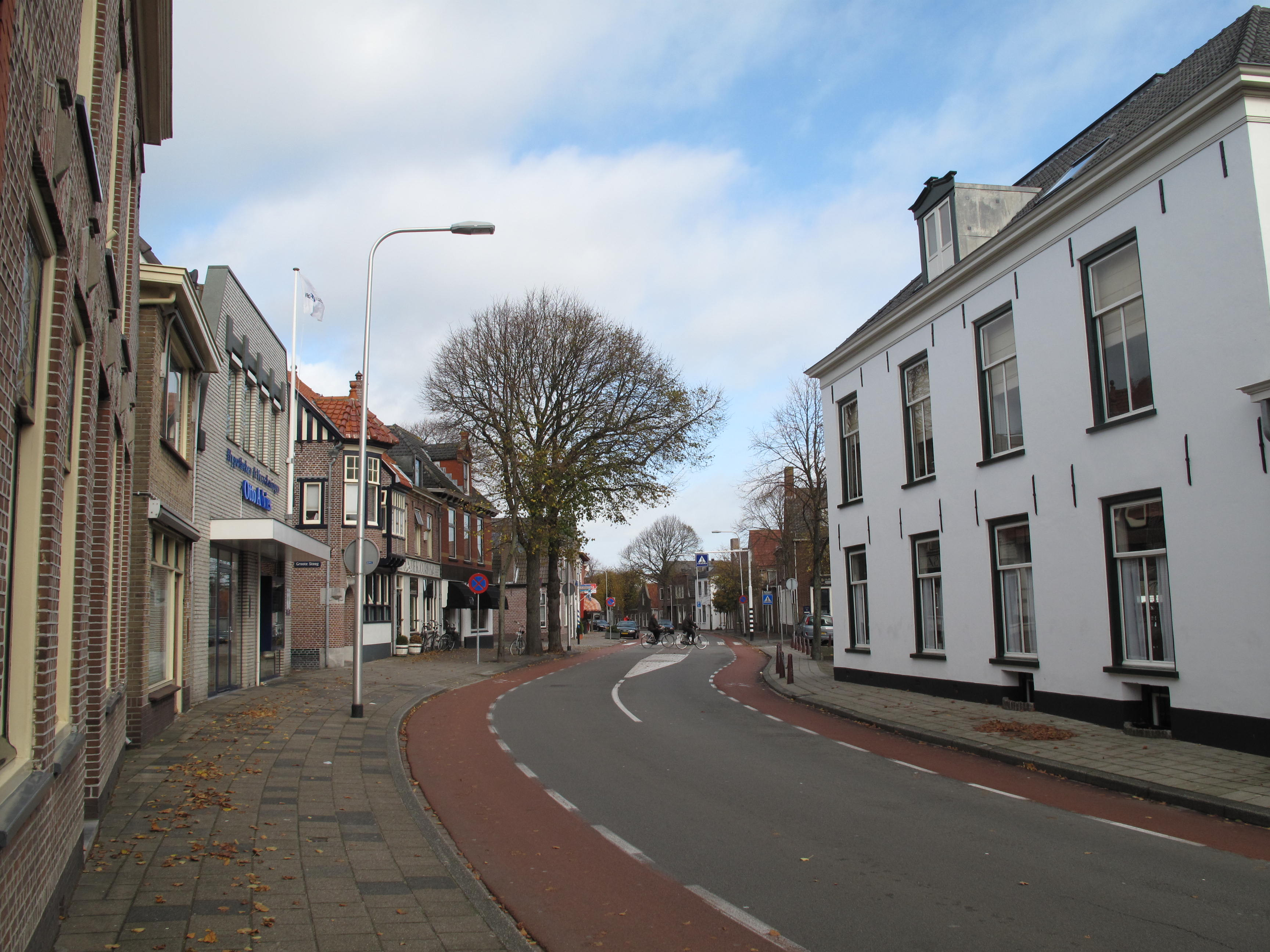
View in the street: Rijnstraat

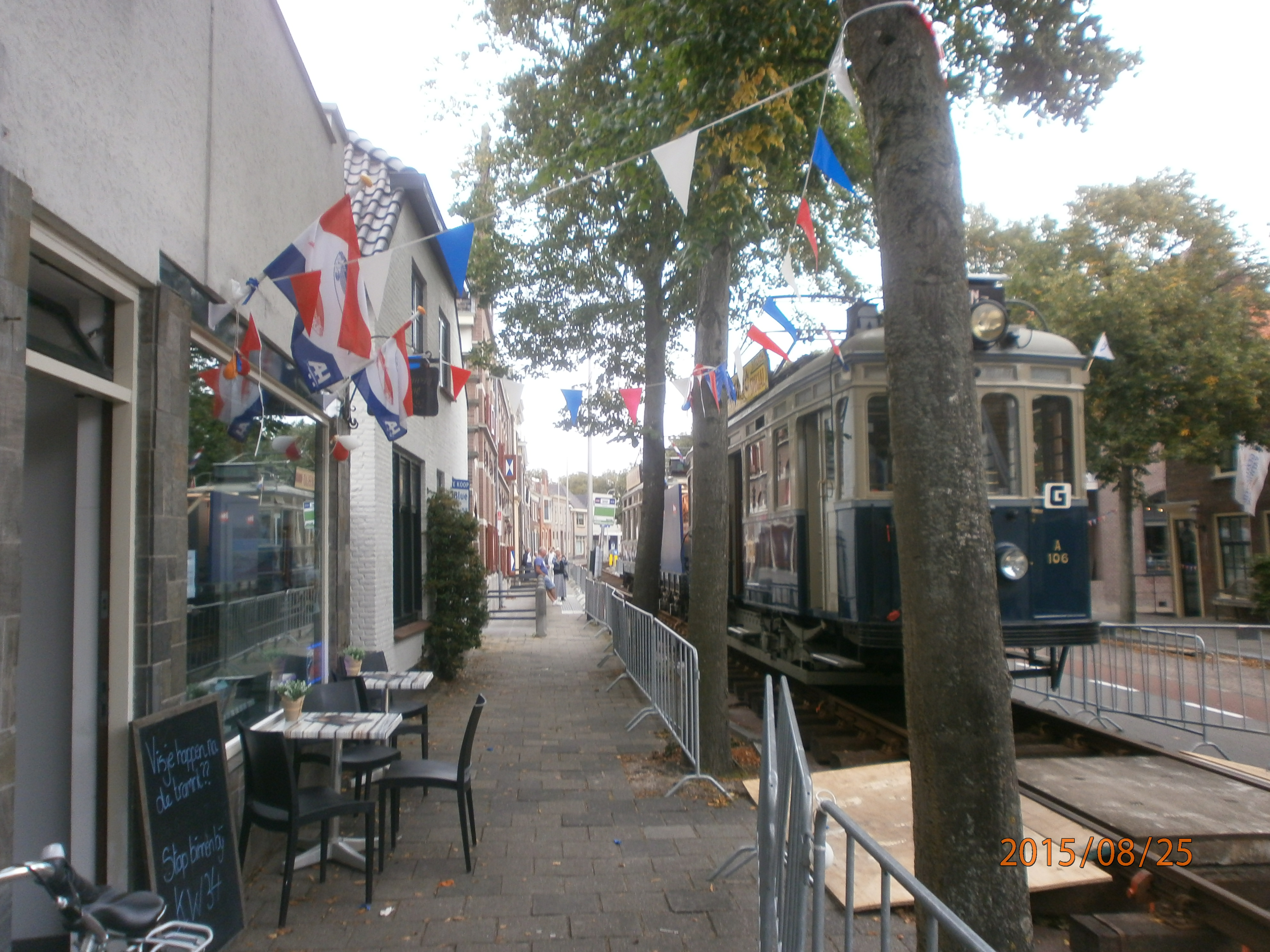
Temporary train near fish and chips shop during autumn festival.
