= Hillegonda Wentzen =

Dutch historical figure (1557–1620)

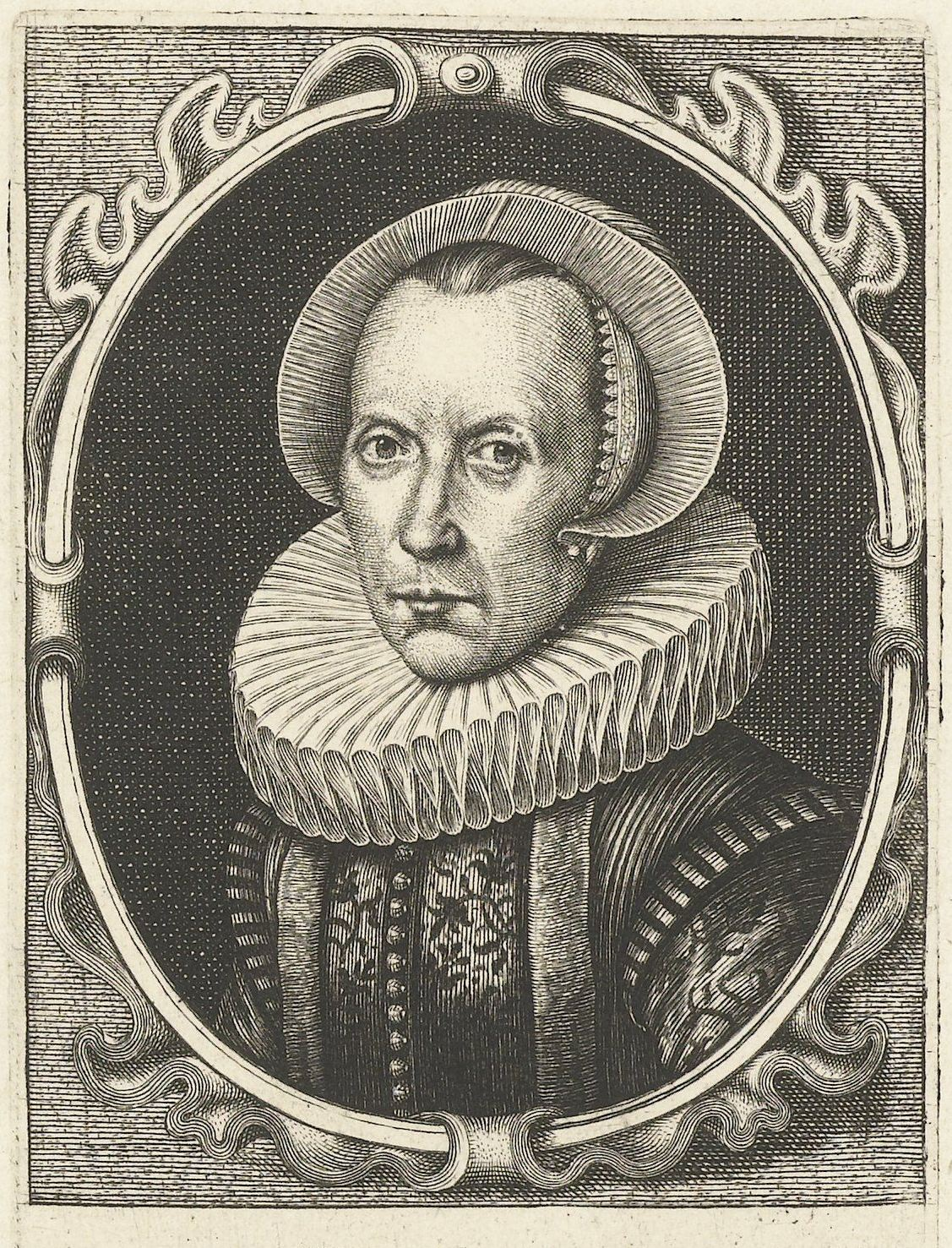
- Born: 19 October 1557; Dordrecht, Netherlands
- Died: 19 October 1620 (aged 63); Loevestein Castle, Dutch Republic
- Known for: Following her husband into political imprisonment
- Spouse: Rombout Hogerbeets

Hillegonda Wentzen also written as Hillegonda Wentzen, Hillegonda Hogerbeets and Hillegonda Wentzen (19 October 1557 – 19 October 1620) was a Dutch woman known for accompanying her husband, Rombout Hogerbeets, during his political imprisonment in the early 17th century. Her life was closely tied to a turbulent period in the Dutch Republic, particularly surrounding the conflict between Maurice of Nassau and the Remonstrants.

== Biography ==
Wentzen was born in Dordrecht on 19 October 1557. She was the daughter of Adriaan Wentzen, a former pensionary of Dordrecht (1576–1578) and later a judge at the Hoge Raad, and Josina van Egmond van der Nijenburg.

In March 1591, she married Rombout Hogerbeets, who served as pensionary of Leiden and from 1596, as a judge at the Hoge Raad. The couple had eight children, of whom five daughters and one son reached adulthood.

=== Political turmoil and imprisonment ===
In August 1618, Hogerbeets, a member of the States General and an opponent of Prince Maurice, was arrested in The Hague alongside Hugo Grotius. He was later sentenced to life imprisonment and confiscation of his property. The same sentence extended to his wife's possessions.

For nine months, Wentzen was not allowed to visit her husband. After sentencing, she was permitted to join him in the Gevangenpoort and later at Loevestein Castle, where she was confined to his chamber. Despite poor conditions, she stayed with him to provide care and cook meals.

=== Death ===
Wentzen fell ill in June 1620. Though Maria van Reigersberch, the wife of Hugo Grotius, repeatedly requested permission to care for her, the authorities denied these requests. Wentzen died on her 63rd birthday, 19 October 1620, after four months of illness, still confined at Loevestein. Her body remained in the room for three days before being transported to Dordrecht for burial in the family grave.

== Legacy ==
Hogerbeets praised his wife's "manly courage" in a letter. Hugo Grotius composed a Latin epitaph in her memory, later translated into Dutch by the historian Gerard Brandt.

She is adopted into the works 1001 Vrouwen uit de Nederlandse geschiedenis; a compilation of 1001 biographies of famous women of the Netherlands.

=== In art ===
Two posthumous engravings of Hillegonda Wentzen are held by the Rijksmuseum:

- A print by Hendrik Bary (1657–1707), featuring a bust portrait alongside biographical notes and Grotius’s poem.
- A portrait by Philippus Velijn, dated 1820.
