= Elselina van Houwening =

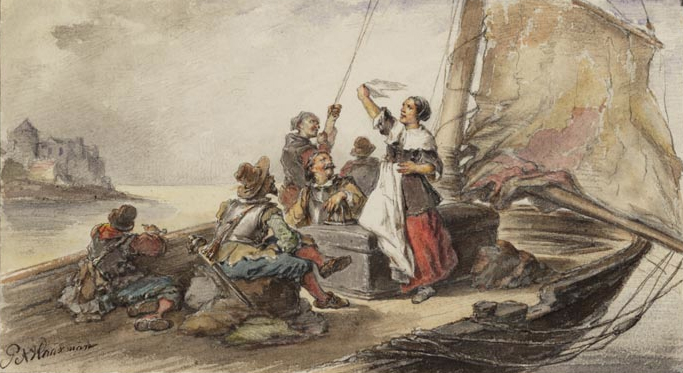
Elsje van Houwening op de Gorkummer beurtman bij de kist met Hugo de Groot, painted by Pieter Alardus Haaxman.

Elselina van Houwening, or Elsje van Houwing, (buried March 8, 1681) was the maid who helped in the escape of Hugo Grotius from Loevestein Castle in a book chest.

In 1619, when van Houwening was a maid for Hugo Grotius and Maria van Reigersberch in The Hague, Grotius was accused of treason and imprisoned in Loevestein Castle. She accompanied her employer in his confinement. Together with Grotius and his wife, a plan was hatched to smuggle Grotius out of the castle in a chest meant to be filled with books. Van Houwening played an active role in the implementation of the plan. She accompanied the chest on the boat trip on the Merwede and made sure that it was delivered to a friendly address in Gorinchem.

In 1625 she married notary William Fields, who also had been employed by Grotius and had been trained by him. The couple settled in The Hague, where her husband in 1642 was an Advocate at the Hof van Holland. Van Houwening died in 1681 and was buried in her hometown on March 8 of that year.
