= Rombout Hogerbeets =

Dutch jurist and statesman

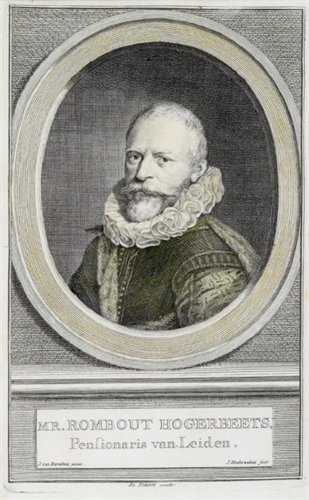
Rombout Hogerbeets by Jacobus Houbraken

Rombout Hogerbeets (Hoorn, 24 June 1561 — Wassenaar, 7 September 1625) was a Dutch jurist and statesman. He was tried for treason, together with Johan van Oldenbarnevelt, Hugo Grotius, and Gilles van Ledenberg during the political crisis of 1617–18 in the Dutch Republic, and sentenced to life-imprisonment. He shared Loevestein prison with Grotius.

== Early life and career ==
Hogerbeets was the son of Dirk Hendriksz. Hogerbeets, a medical doctor and burgomaster of Hoorn. When he was seven years old, he went into exile to Wesel with his parents, because they were persecuted by Alba's Council of Troubles. He attended Latin school in that city. He studied law under Donellus and received his doctorate in law from Leiden University in 1584. Already in 1590 he was appointed pensionary of the city of Leiden and secretary of the Board of Regents of Leiden University. He resigned these posts when he was made a Justice in the Hoge Raad van Holland en Zeeland (the supreme court of the provinces of Holland and Zeeland) in 1596. As hoofdingeland (member of the governing board) of the Holland North Quarter Drainage District he was closely involved in the draining of the Beemster lake around 1605. In 1611 he was a member of the diplomatic mission of the States-General of the Netherlands to mediate between Denmark and Sweden in the Kalmar War (which had harmed Dutch commerce). On 8 December 1617 he was again appointed pensionary of Leiden and he therefore resigned his seat in the Hoge Raad.

Hogerbeets married Hillegonda Wentzen in March, 1591. They had one son and five daughters.

== Arrest and trial ==
As pensionary of Leiden, Hogerbeets was deeply involved in the political crisis that engulfed the Oldenbarnevelt regime in 1618 and brought about its fall. Leiden was one of the Holland cities whose regents were partisans of the Remonstrants and had agitated for the Sharp Resolution of 1617 which authorized city governments to raise private armies, called waardgelders. The Counter-Remonstrants, the enemies of the Remonstrants opposed this, and the stadtholder, Maurice of Nassau viewed this policy as a challenge to his authority as commander-in-chief of the States Army. In the ensuing rounds of intrigue and counter-intrigue to procure the disbanding of the waardgelder companies, or to prevent the disbandment, Hogerbeets, together with Grotius and a few other Remonstrant regents from Holland, privately met with a like-minded group of Utrecht regents, led by Gilles van Ledenberg to discuss strategy in the political struggle with Maurice and the Counter-Remonstrants on 5 July 1618. This was later construed as a conspiracy.

Maurice went ahead with his plans to disarm the waardgelders in Utrecht at the end of July, 1618. His show of force thoroughly intimidated the group of regents around Oldenbarnevelt and they were prepared to make concessions. Nevertheless, on 28 August 1618 the States-General, on a secret majority-vote, authorized Maurice to arrest the Remonstrant "ringleaders" and the next day Oldenbarnevelt, Grotius, Ledenberg and Hogerbeets were duly taken prisoner and incarcerated at the Binnenhof.

As a citizen of Leiden and of Holland, Hogerbeets would normally have been tried by a court of law of that city or that province. This was a civil right, known as the Jus de non evocando. However, the States-General decided to try the defendants themselves and as the confederation did not have its own judicial branch the matter was eventually delegated to a judicial commission of the States-General (a policy that was not unusual in itself). The pre-trial investigation in the case was handled by three fiscals (prosecutors): Laurens Sylla, Pieter van Leeuwen and Anthonie Duyck.

As an accomplished lawyer, Hogerbeets tried to avail himself of his legal rights under Dutch law. However, due process was systematically denied him, though he apparently was not threatened with torture like his colleague Ledenberg. After many interrogations and a long wait (during which his wife was denied access to him, though he was allowed to correspond with her) he finally expected to have his day in court on 18 May 1619. A few days earlier, members of the court had pressed him privately to ask for mercy, but he had refused, protesting his innocence. When the trial opened he was not allowed to state his defense, but made to listen to the reading of the verdict, that had already been decided upon. Together with Grotius he was convicted of treason against the federal government and sentenced to life imprisonment and forfeiture of his and his wife's assets.

Like Grotius, Hogerbeets was incarcerated in the fortress of Loevestein. Their wives were allowed to join them in jail. In 1621, Grotius was hidden by his wife, Maria van Reigersberch, in a book chest that was regularly brought for them and escaped. Hogerbeets' wife fell ill, however, and after four months she died on 19 October 1620, her birthday. It apparently took three days to remove the body, and it caused him much distress to have to share the cell with his wife's corpse.

During his incarceration he authored a law manual, entitled: Korte inleidinge tot de praktyk voor de Hoven van Justitie in Holland (Short introduction to the practice of law before the courts of justice in Holland).

When Maurice's brother Frederick Henry succeeded the former in 1625, Hogerbeets was allowed to transfer to more pleasant surroundings in Wassenaar, where he was put under house arrest. He died there on 7 September 1625. He was buried in the Groote Kerk in The Hague on 12 September 1625.

== Sources ==
- (in Dutch) "Levensbeschrijving van Rombout Hogerbeets," in Stijl, S., Stinstra, J. (1777) Levensbeschryving van eenige voornaame meest Nederlandsche mannen en vrouwen. Deel 4, pp. 272–304
- (in German) "Hogerbeets, Rombout," in: Allgemeine Deutsche Biographie, herausgegeben von der Historischen Kommission bei der Bayrischen Akademie der Wissenschaften, Band 12 (1880), p. 652ff
- "Sententie, uyt-ghesproocken ende ghepronuncieert over Rombout Hogerbeetz, ghewesen pensionaris der stadt Leyden, den 18 may, anno 1619, stilo novo". Google Books (in Dutch). Hillebrant Iacobssz. 1619.
