= Maria van Reigersberg =

Dutch art collector (1632–1673)

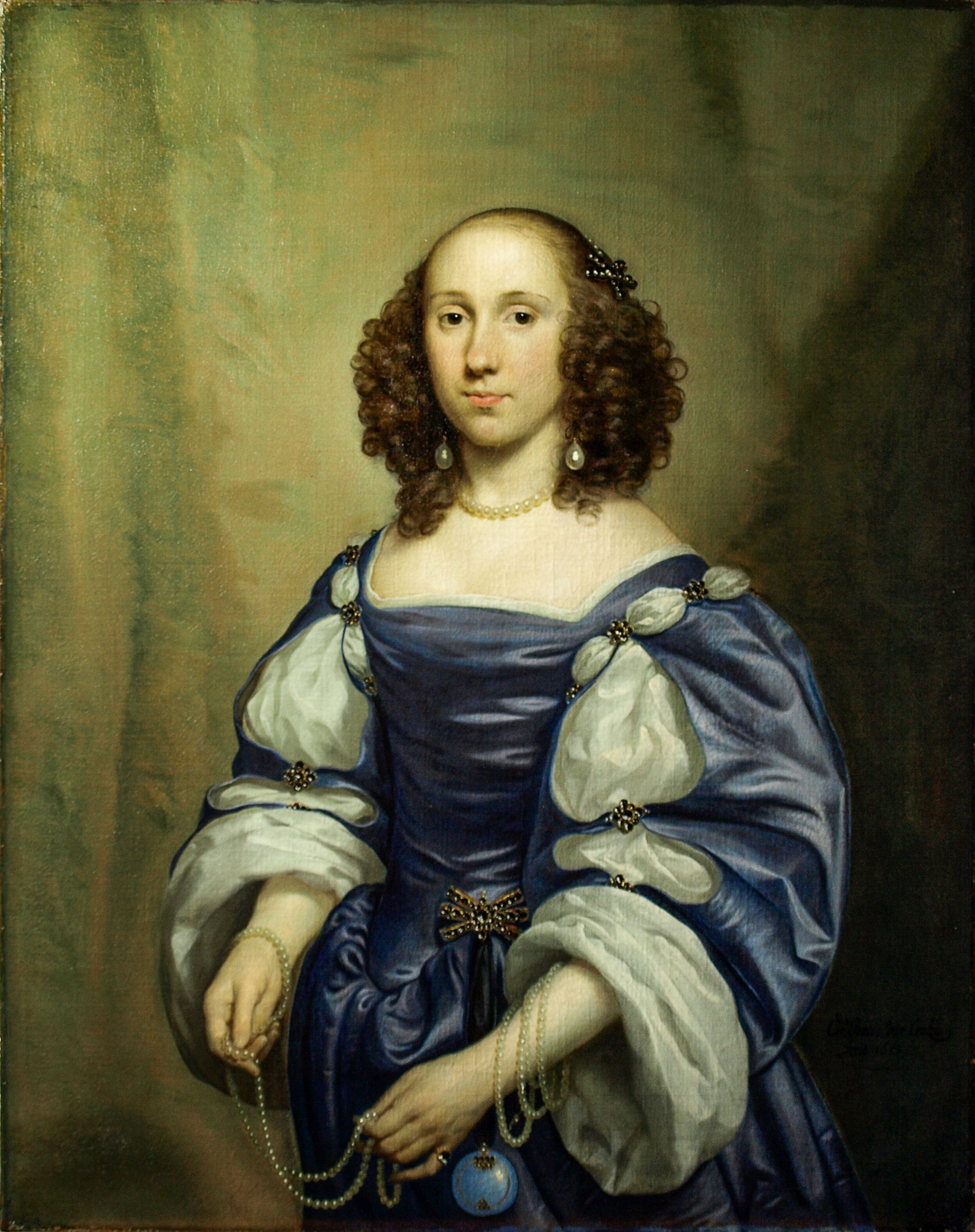
- Born: November 21, 1632; Veere
- Died: December 11, 1673 (aged 41); Katwijk

Maria van Reigersberg or Maria van Reigersberch, Vrouwe van Katwijk (1632 – 1673) was a Dutch art collector best known today for her legacy of extravagant portraits of herself and her family.

Van Reigersberg was born in Veere as the rich daughter of Johan van Reigersberg, heer van Couwerve en Crabbendijke, the bailiff and tax collector of Zeeland. In 1651 she married Willem van Liere, the son of a rich diplomat ennobled with the title 'heer van Oosterwijk en Berkenwoude'. Her aunts were Maria van Reigersberch, known for helping her husband Grotius escape from Loevestein in a chest, and Suzanna van Reigersberg who wrote a treatise on widowhood after her husband died.

On the occasion of their wedding, the young couple commissioned pendant portraits by Cornelis Jonson van Ceulen. In her portrait Maria is shown wearing extravagant jewelry, including a diamond brooch attached to a pocket watch and a similar diamond fastening in her hair. Her blue satin dress includes multiple brooches attaching the sleeves to her white chemise. She is holding two long strands of pearls and wears a pearl necklace and earrings. Her husband is wearing the sash of the Admiralty of Amsterdam, for which he was a representative since 1649.

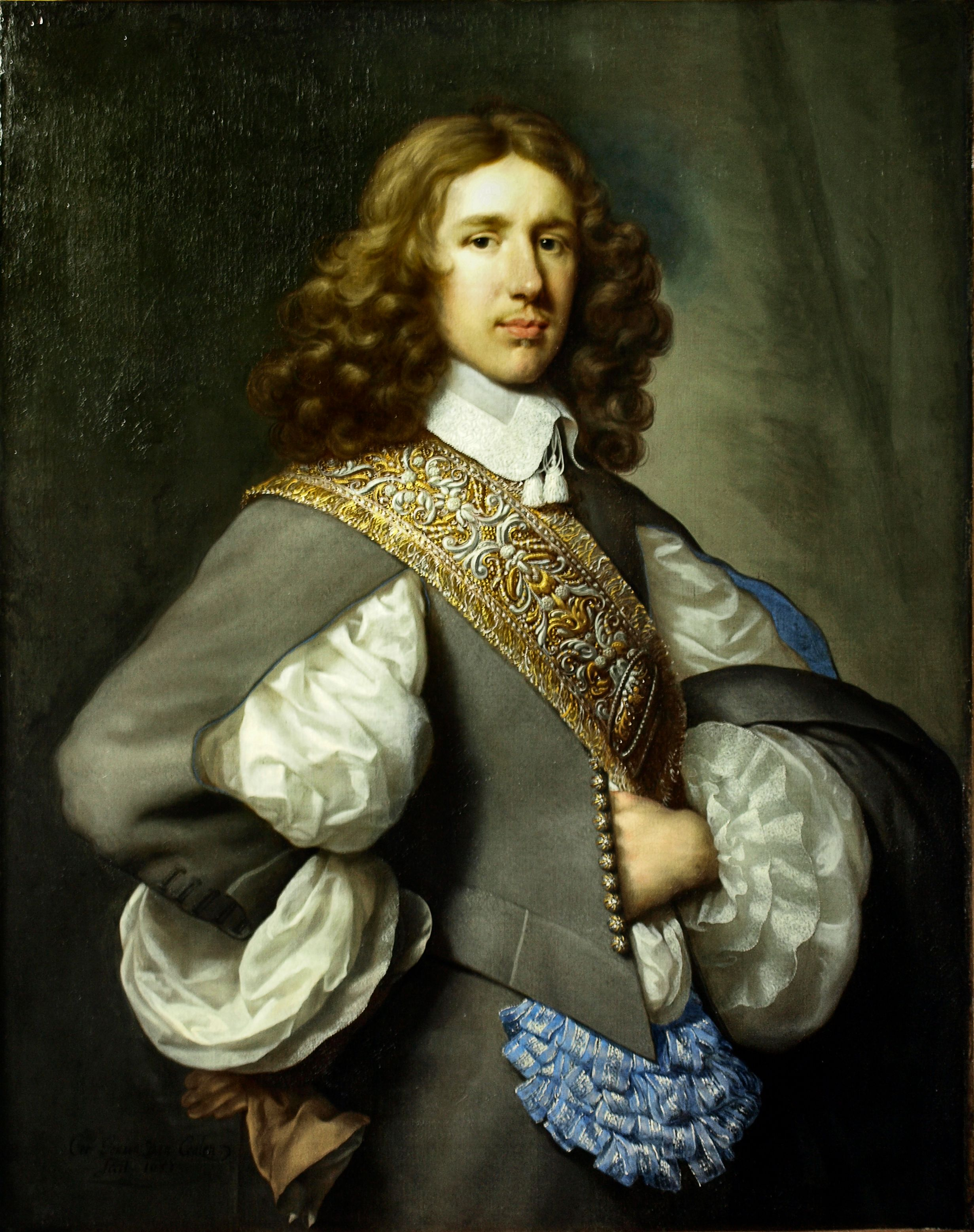

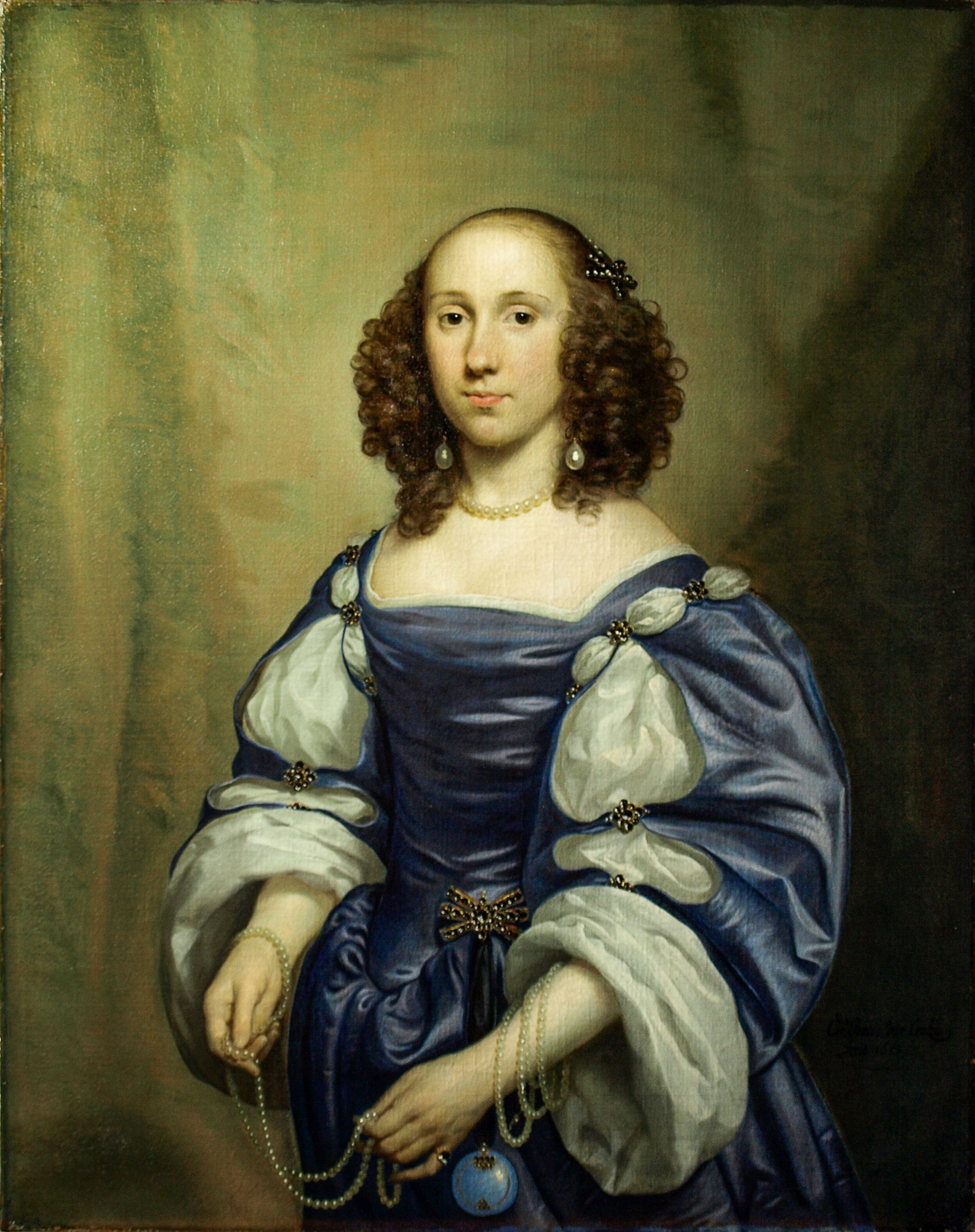

The couple owned property in Katwijk and were in the process of building a stately mansion in Heerlijkheid 't Zandt when Willem died unexpectedly in 1654, leaving Maria with two small children. She immediately set about securing her children's future by setting herself up as the lady of Katwijk, and commissioned a large memorial to her husband there, reserving space for herself. This remarkable tomb by Rombout Verhulst can still be seen in the church in Katwijk and shows her watching over her husband's body under a Latin plaque declaring his virtues, surrounded by the heraldic shields of their combined families.

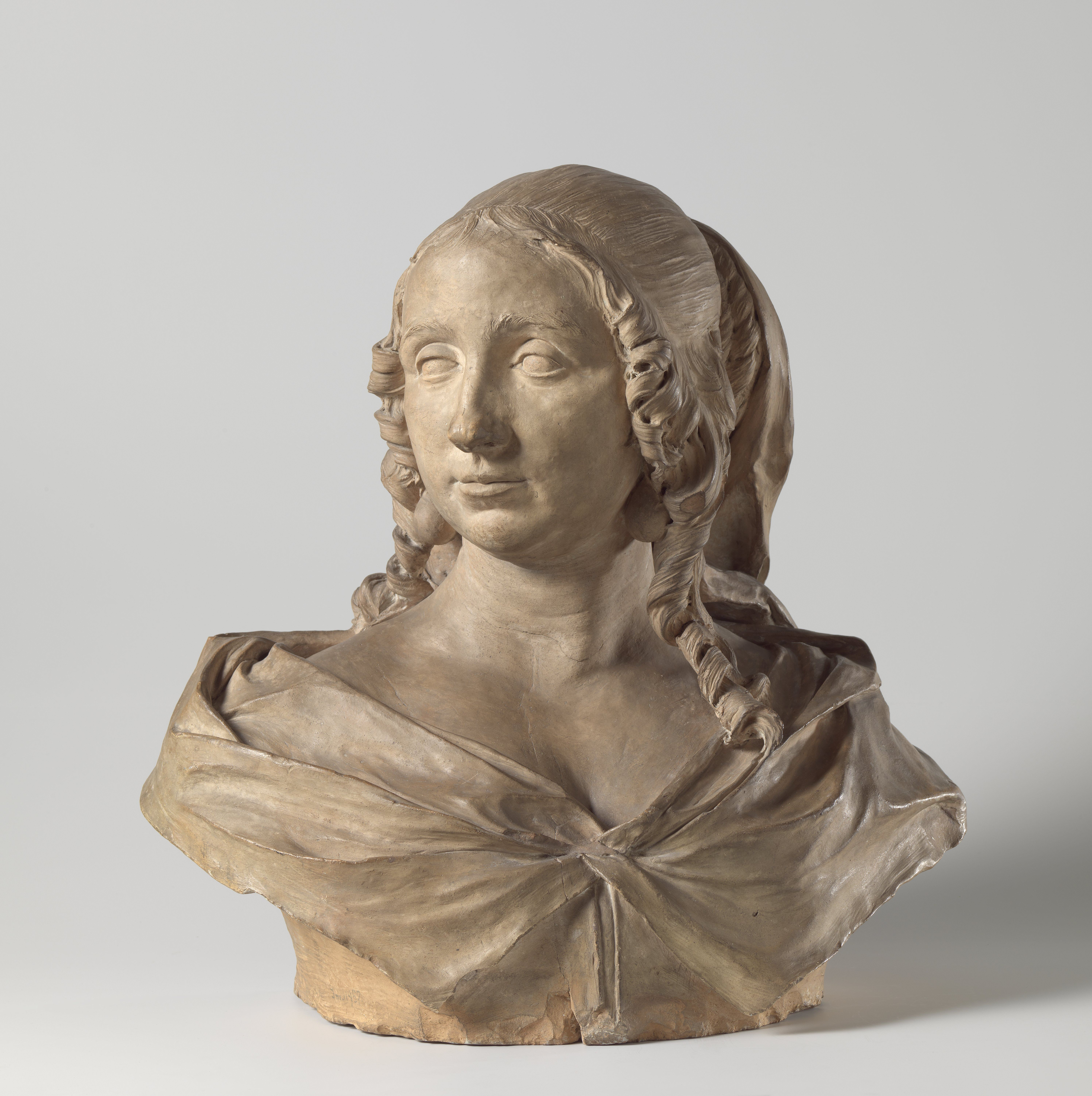
Terracotta bust study of Maria by Verhulst

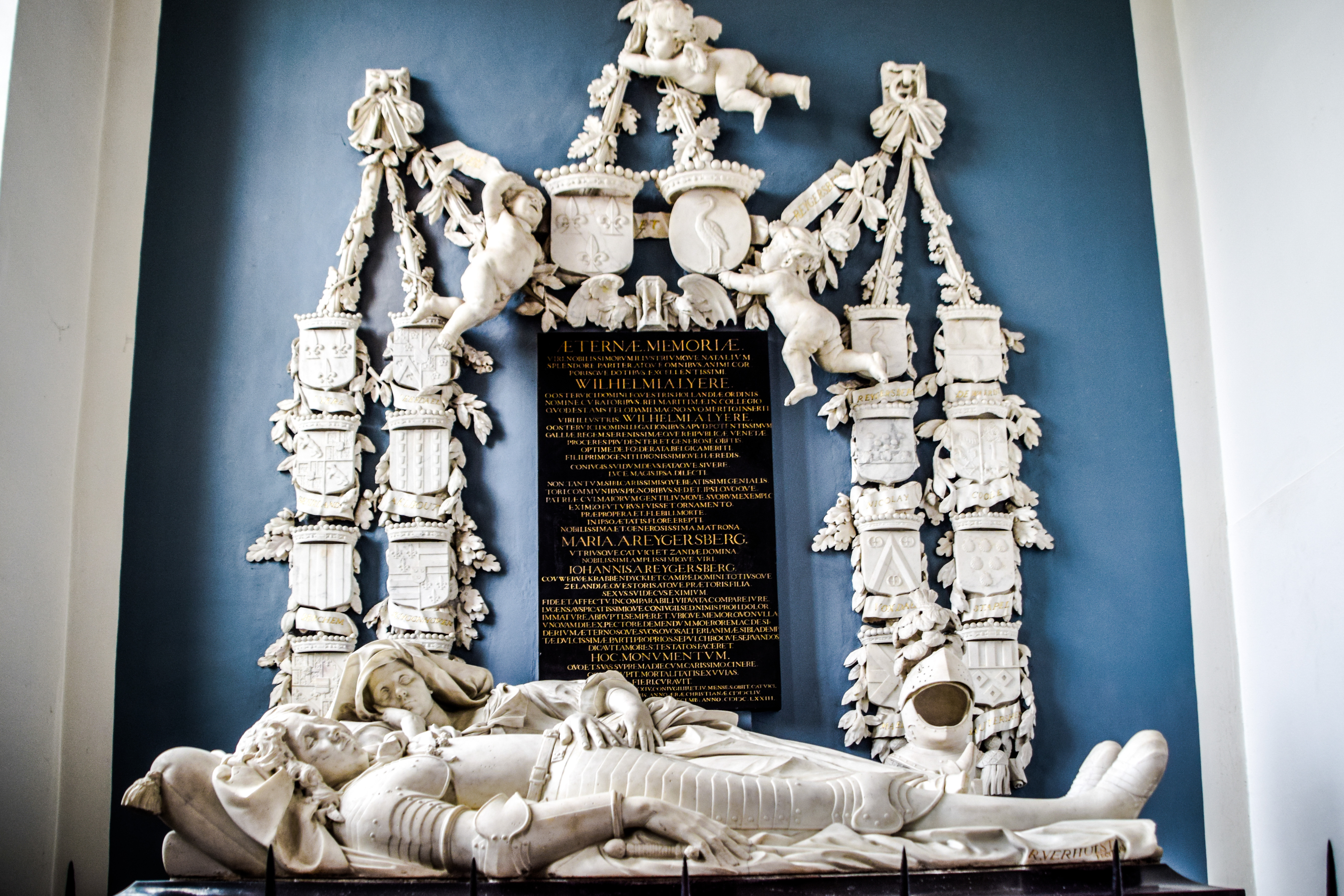

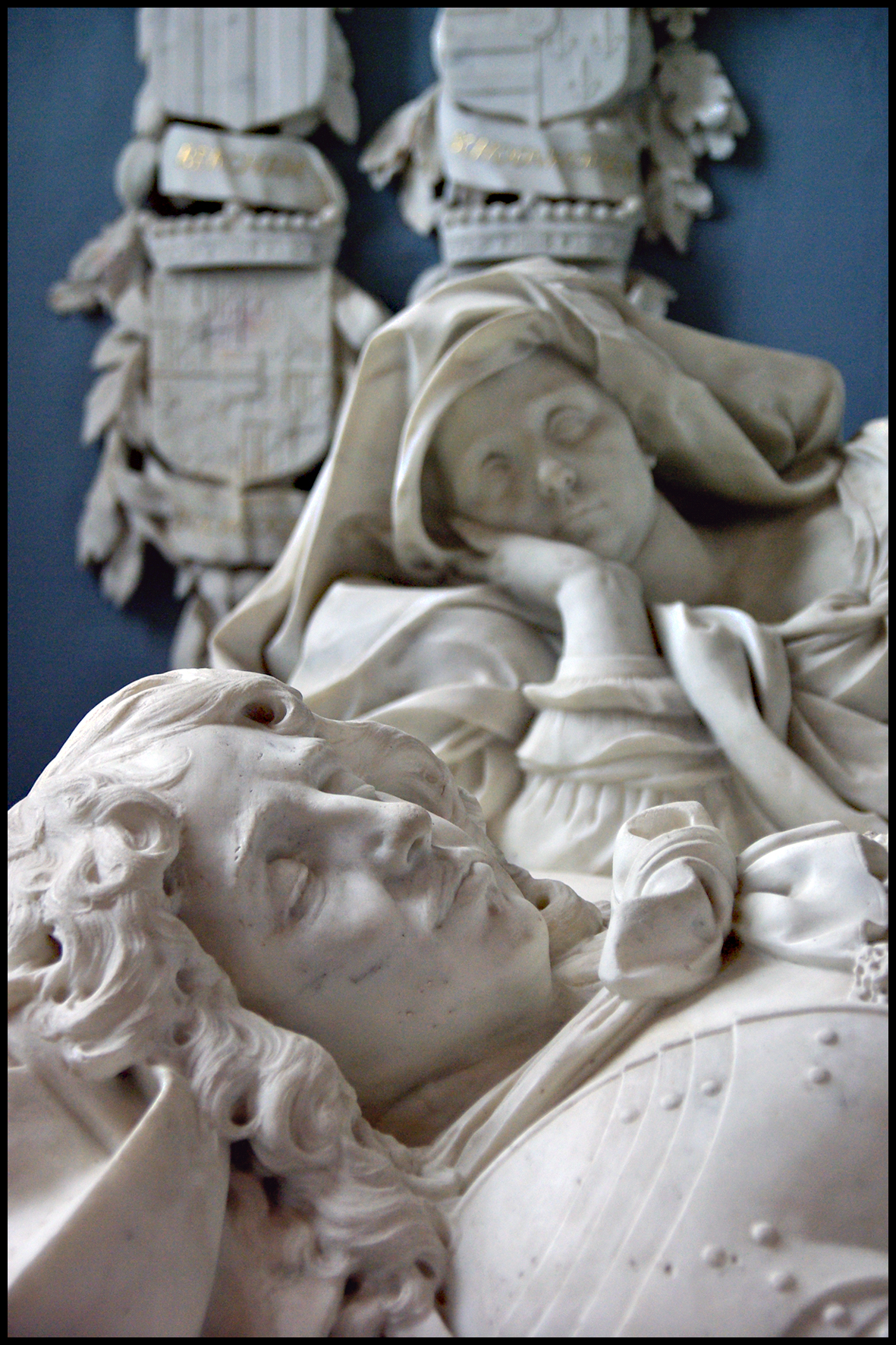

She was successful in adopting her husband's titles and was later able to have her son become the representative in the Admiralty at the age of 14. Her image as the doting widow is apparent in the 1663 family portrait by Adriaen Hanneman she commissioned of herself dipping her hand in a fountain representing Caritas with her two children:

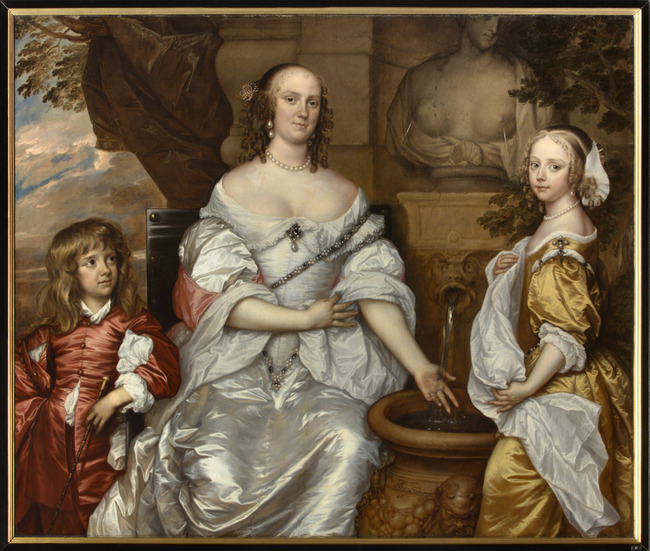
