= Maria van Reigersberch =

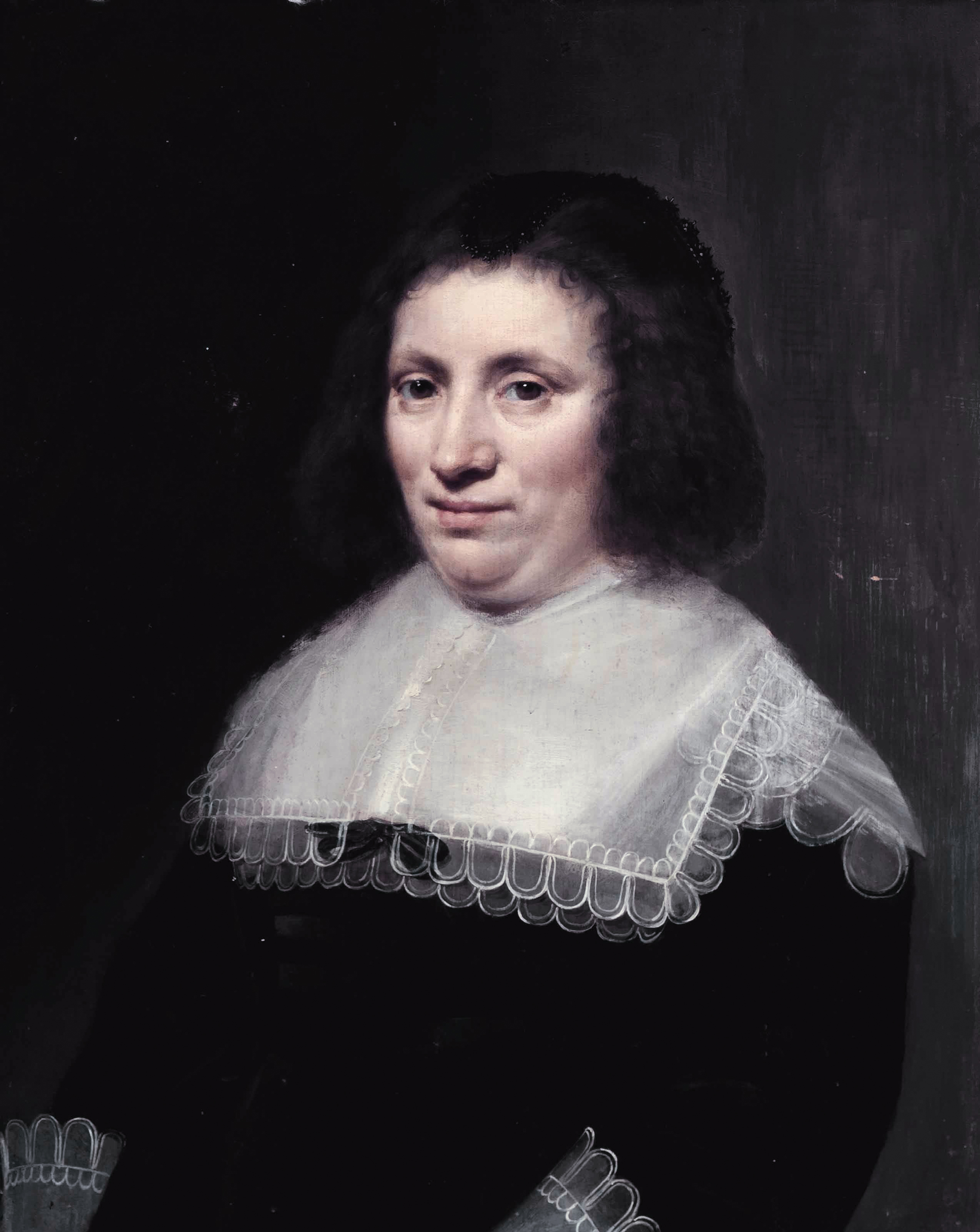
Maria van Reigersberch by a painter from the circle of Michiel Jansz. van Mierevelt

Maria van Reigersberch (Veere? or Boulogne-sur-Mer?, 7 October 1589? — The Hague, 19 April 1653) was the wife of Hugo Grotius, who helped him escape in 1621 from Loevestein Castle during his incarceration there after his 1619 trial.

== Early life ==
Maria was the daughter of the Veere schepen and burgomaster Pieter van Reigersberg (Note: As Nellen speculates, Pieter van Reigersberch probably was a partisan of William the Silent, because that great noble was Marquis of Veere and Flushing and therefore had a say in the appointment of the magistrates of the city of Veere.) and Maria Nicolai (also known as Mayken Claesdr). Her parents fled to Boulogne sur Mer during the troubled times of the reign of Governor General Robert Dudley, 1st Earl of Leicester over the Dutch Republic and may only have returned to Veere after her birth, so that her birthplace is a matter of speculation. As most women at the time, she did not receive a formal education, though she was able to read and write. Her family was rich and she therefore was a desirable marriage partner. She married the up-and-coming lawyer Hugo de Groot (better known as Grotius), who had just been appointed advocaat-fiscaal (prosecutor) at the Hof van Holland on 2 July 1608 in Veere.

The couple settled in The Hague where Grotius made a swift career under the mentorship of Johan van Oldenbarnevelt, the Land's Advocate of Holland. In 1613 he was appointed pensionary of the city of Rotterdam with his main task the representation of that city in the States of Holland and West Friesland and the States General of the Netherlands. During this period their first seven children were born: Cornelia (26 April 1611) and Cornelis (2 February 1613) in The Hague; Pieter (24 February 1614; died 18 June 1614); another Pieter (28 March 1615), Françoise (17 August 1616; died 3 May 1617), Maria (16 April 1617), and Diederik (10 October 1618; a month and a half after Grotius' arrest) in Rotterdam

== Grotius' trial, incarceration and escape ==
Grotius was arrested on 29 August 1618, together with van Oldenbarnevelt, Rombout Hogerbeets, the pensionary of Leiden, and Gilles van Ledenberg, the secretary of the States of Utrecht, on suspicion of treason, on the orders of stadtholder Maurice, Prince of Orange. They were held incommunicado for eight months, during which time Maria was not allowed to visit her husband in his cell in the Binnenhof, not even when he was taken severely ill. Eventually, Grotius was sentenced to life imprisonment on 18 May 1619 by a court of 24 delegated judges of the States General. He was to serve his sentence in Loevestein Castle, together with Hogerbeets, who received the same sentence.

Maria immediately started to pester the States General with petitions to obtain better living conditions for her husband. She was eventually able to get permission to live at the castle for extended periods of time with her children and servants. She also obtained permission for Grotius to receive books to help him in his research. These books were transported in a chest. On 22 March 1621 Maria helped Grotius into that chest, while she faked his body in his bed with his upper clothes. The chest was transported to Gorinchem, escorted by Maria's maid Elsje van Houwening; Maria stayed behind and was locked up herself for a while. Grotius traveled to Paris and was followed by his wife, after she had been released.

== Life in exile ==
In Paris Grotius expressed his gratitude for his wife's role in his escape with the Latin poem Silva ad Thuanum in which he made it known that the ruse with the chest had been invented by Maria. Grotius soon unleashed a torrent of pamphlets and larger publications in which he defended Oldenbarnevelt and himself (the best-known is his Apologia or Verantwoordingh, published in Latin and Dutch in Paris in 1622). In the next decade he became an icon of the faction that would grow into the Dutch States Party.

On 31 October 1626 another daughter, Françoise, was born in Paris, who died shortly after.

Because Grotius could not safely visit the Dutch Republic, Maria was often called upon to manage his affairs there. She took care of the contacts with his Dutch publishers, and also started several lawsuits to undo the forfeiture of his assets (and hers, because her considerable wealth was in their community property that had been seized in its entirety). For her own property she was successful in 1625 (after the death of Maurice and the appointment of his half-brother Frederick Henry, Prince of Orange as the new stadtholder), while the forfeiture of Grotius' assets was lifted in 1630. She also sued Rotterdam for Grotius' arrears in pay, because the city government had stopped his salary after his conviction. From the correspondence with her husband during these absences it becomes clear that Maria was in charge of the finances in the family. (Note: She left an extensive correspondence, not only with her husband, but also with her friends and business contacts, that was published in 1902; Cf. Rogge, H.C., ed. (1902). Brieven van en aan Maria van Reigersberch (in Dutch). Leiden.)

Grotius was appointed ambassador of Christina, Queen of Sweden to France in 1635. Maria then began to live in great style, living in the ambassadorial residence with many servants, and hosting sumptuous parties for fellow diplomats. On one of her voyages to The Hague in this period she used a carriage with six horses, which caused much jealousy among the Hague inhabitants, to Maria's secret pleasure. She also visited the Queen Regent of France, Anne of Austria, regularly on her own. Maria had her own income from her possessions in the Republic. She invested (not always wisely) on her own. In short, she was an independent woman.

After Grotius died in 1645 in Rostock, Maria did not travel to Delft for his funeral, but remained for a while in Paris, where she started upon the project of publishing Grotius' collected works (continued after her own death by her sons). She eventually returned to The Hague, where she died on 19 April 1653. From her last will it becomes clear that she died a rich woman, who had given her daughter a large dowry, and left her three surviving sons large bequests. She was buried with her husband in the Nieuwe Kerk (Delft).

== Notes and references ==
=== Sources ===
- Knappert (1912). Blok, P.J. and P.C. Molhuysen (ed.). "Reigersberch, Maria van, in: Nieuw Nederlandsch Biografisch Woordenboek, Vol. 2". Huyghens ING (in Dutch). pp. 1181–1185.
- Nellen, H. "Reigersberch, Maria van (1589?-1653)". Huyghens ING (in Dutch).
