= Poederoijen =

- Village
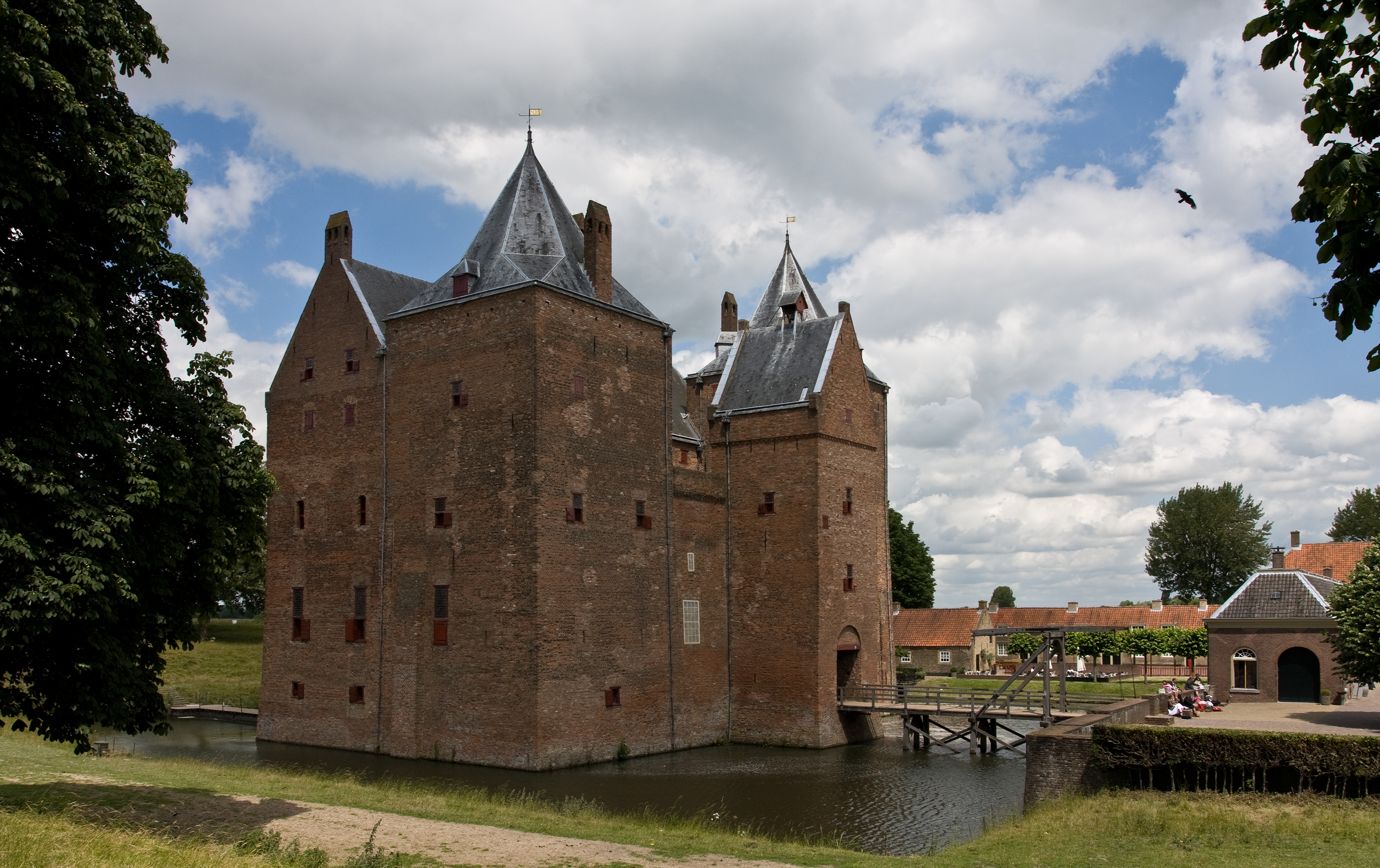
- Loevestein Castle

- Coat of arms

- Location in the Netherlands Poederoijen (Netherlands)
- Coordinates: 51°47′8″N 5°4′49″E
- Country: Netherlands
- Province: Gelderland
- Municipality: Zaltbommel

Area
  - Total: 6.21 km^{2} (2.40 sq mi)
- Elevation: 2 m (6.6 ft)

Population (2021)
  - Total: 1,095
  - Density: 176/km^{2} (457/sq mi)
- Time zone: UTC+1 (CET)
  - Summer (DST): UTC+2 (CEST)
- Postal code: 5307
- Dialing code: 0418

Poederoijen is a village in the Dutch province of Gelderland. It is a part of the municipality of Zaltbommel, and lies about 9 km southeast of Gorinchem. Poederoijen was a separate municipality until 1955, when it was merged with Brakel. Loevestein Castle is located in Poederoijen.

== History ==
It was first mentioned in 850 as in uilla. The etymology is unclear. The village developed along the Afgedamde Maas. The tower of the Dutch Reformed Church dates from the 15th century. The church itself was rebuilt in 1897 after a fire. In 1840, Poederoijen was home to 425 people. In 1861, the village was flooded, and 1897, a large part of Poederoijen was lost in a fire.

== Castles ==
Loevestein Castle is located to the north-west of the village, and was built in 1365. It was enlarged many times, and in the 17th century became part of the Dutch Water Line, a defensive line of inundation to protect Holland. The castle was decommissioned as a fortress in 1951, and extensively restored.

== Gallery ==
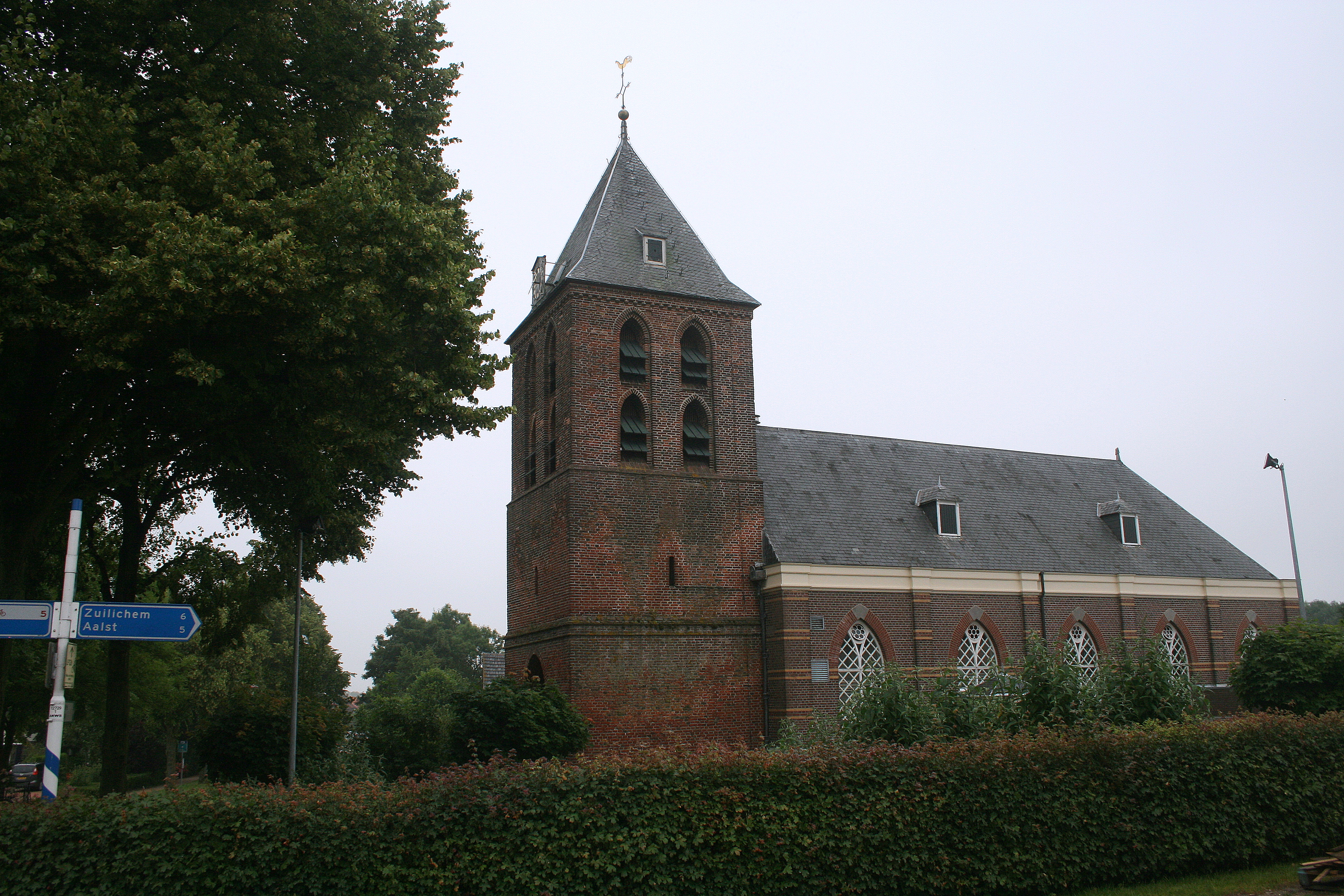
Protestant Church of Poederoijen

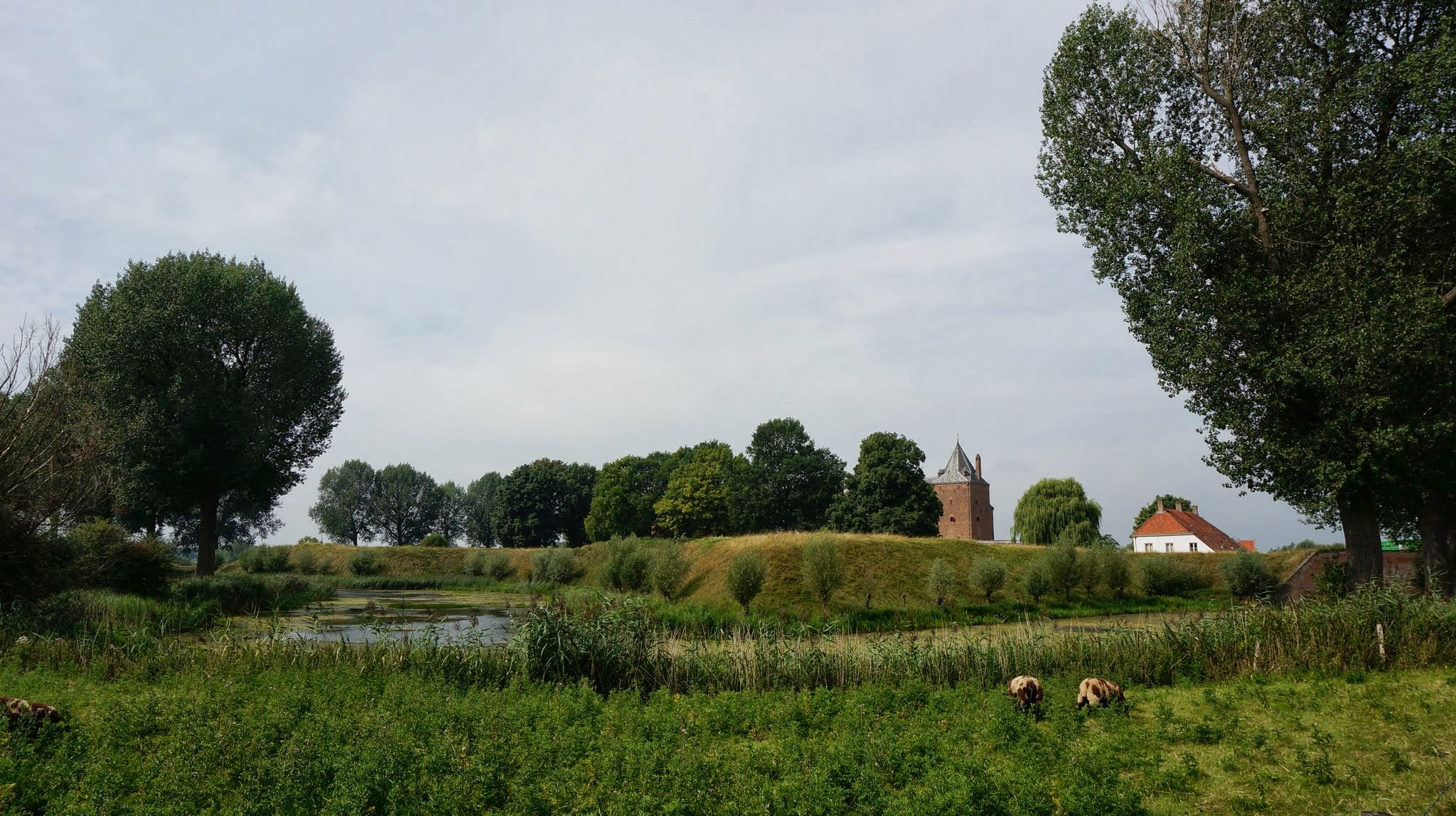
View on Poederoijen

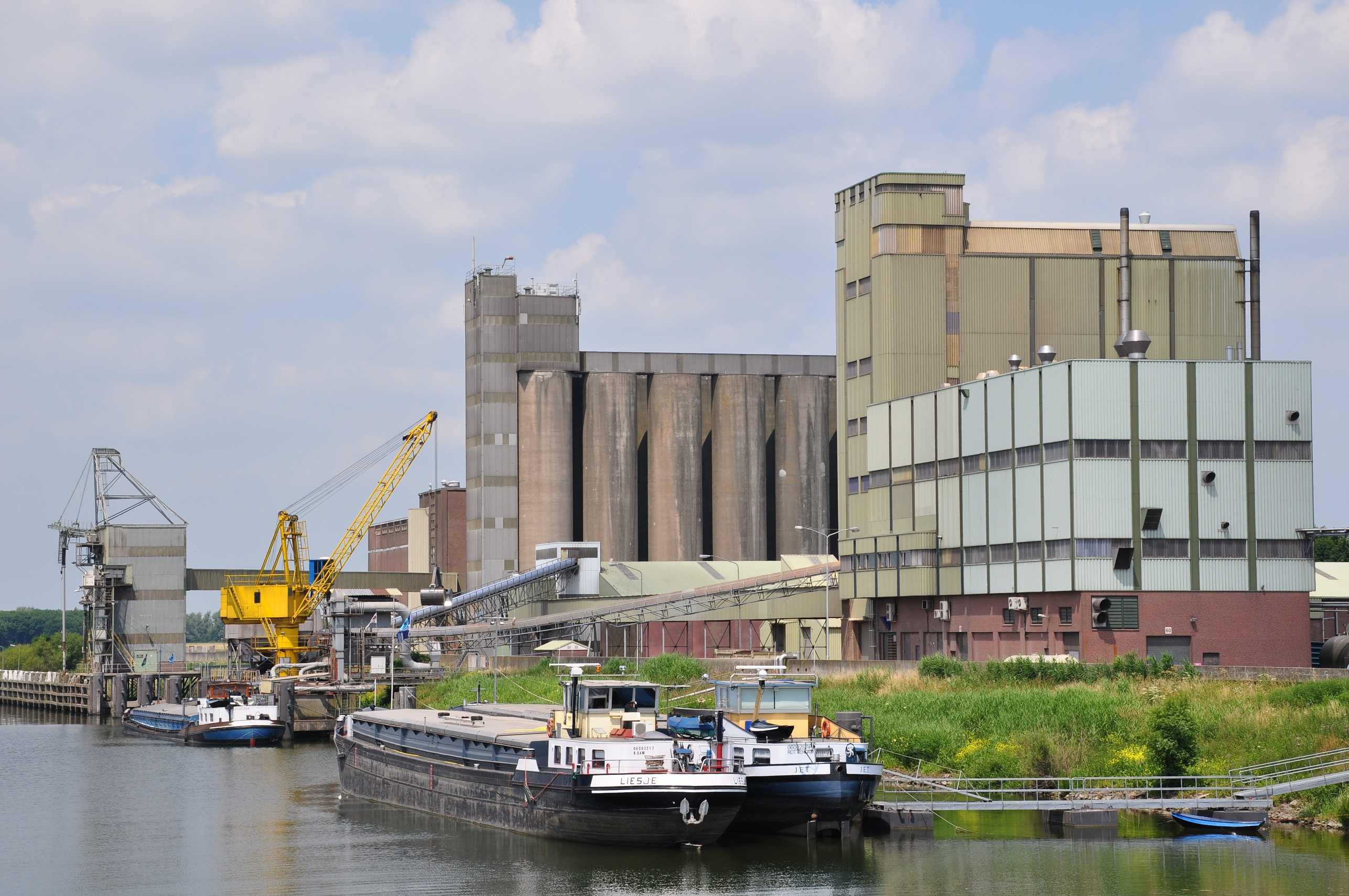
Industry along the river

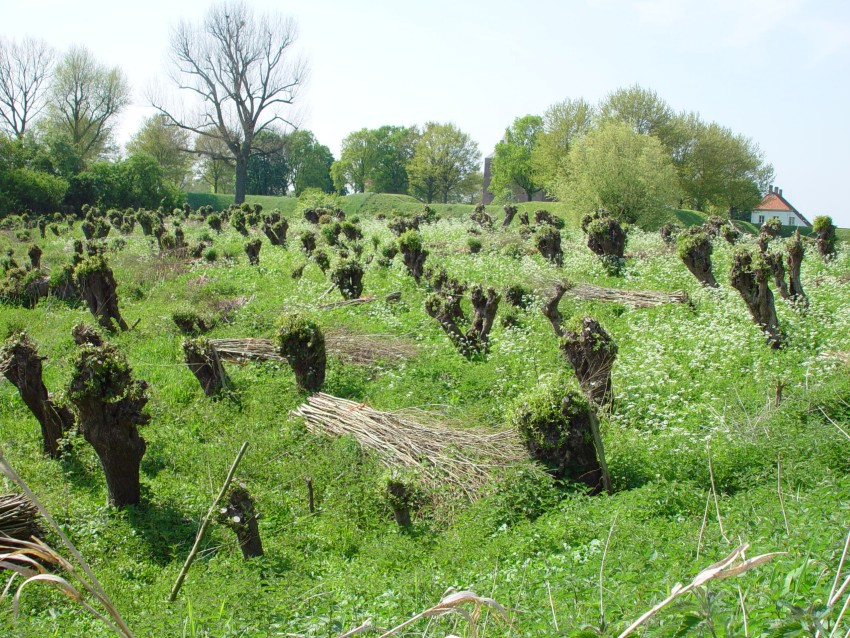
Willows near Loevestein Castle

== Notable people ==
- Gian van Veen (born 2002), Dutch darts player and 2026 World Darts Championship Runner-Up
