= Gilles van Ledenberg =

Dutch statesman

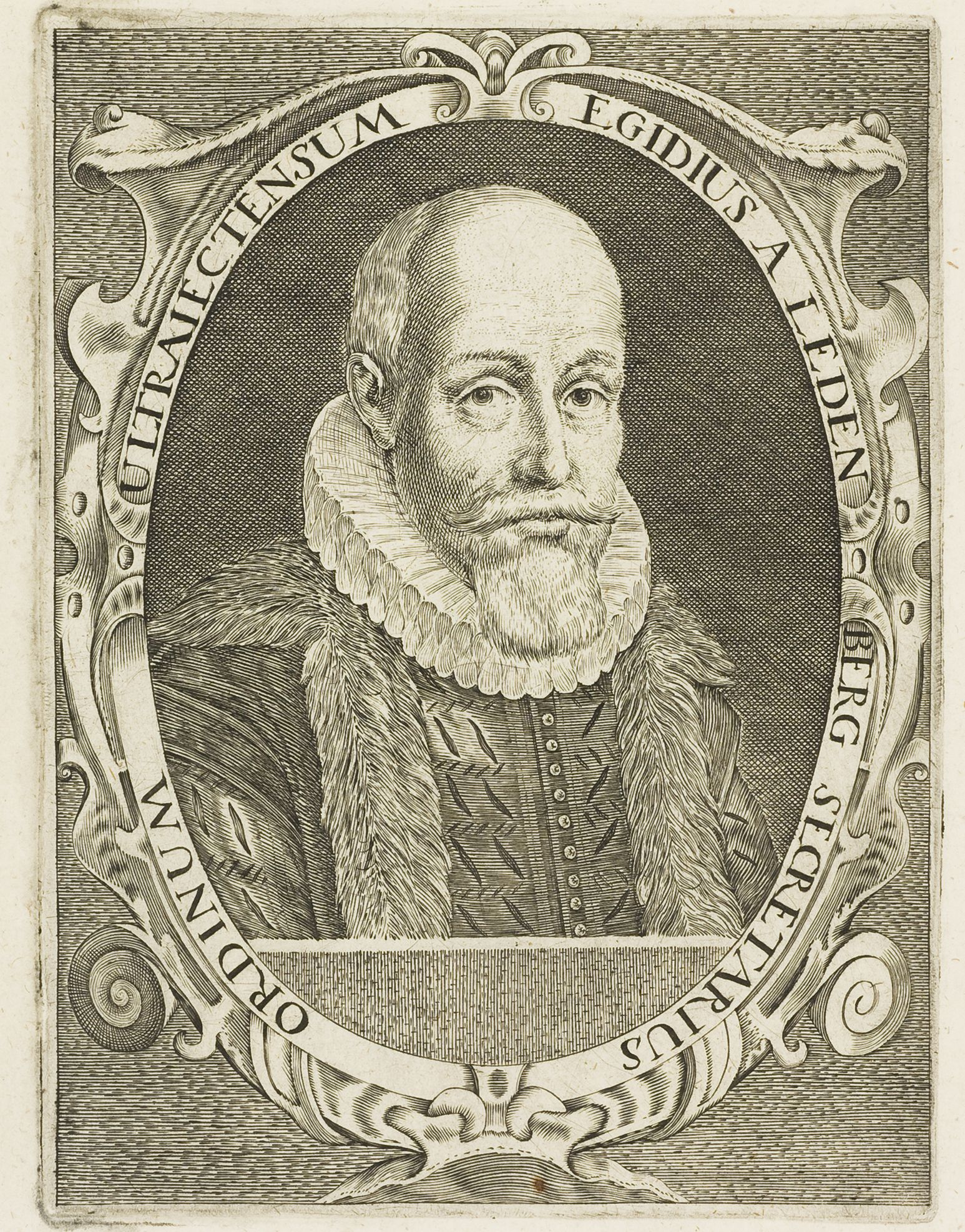
Gilles van Ledenberg

Gilles van Ledenberg (c. 1550 – 28 September 1618) was a Dutch statesman. He was secretary of the States of Utrecht from 1588 until his arrest for treason in 1618, together with Johan van Oldenbarnevelt. He committed suicide to prevent forfeiture of his assets, but he was sentenced to death posthumously and posthumously executed.

== Career ==
Ledenberg had humble origins. His father was probably a mason. He may have been a friar in his youth. However, he worked himself up to clerk of Floris Thin, the pensionary of the States of Utrecht, whom he succeeded in 1590, due to an intrigue by Oldenbarnevelt who wished to block the appointment of his rival Paulus Buys in that position. He had been secretary of the States from 1588 and also was appointed Clerk of the Utrecht "Leenhof" (one of the courts). He was married several times, lastly to Johanna van Sypesteyn (member of an aristocratic family).

== Arrest and trial ==
Ledenberg's notoriety derives from his role in the waardgelder crisis of 1618. During the Twelve Years' Truce, social unrest had arisen because of the conflict in the Dutch Reformed Church between the Remonstrants and their opponents. Mobs had attacked regents of the Remonstrant party while the civic militias and the federal military authorities looked the other way. To protect themselves, these regents had pushed through the so-called Sharp Resolution in the States of Holland which allowed the local authorities in cities to recruit their own companies of mercenaries, called waardgelders, to maintain order. This was seen as a threat to his authority as commander-in-chief of the federal forces of the Dutch Republic by stadtholder Maurice of Nassau, Prince of Orange. Maurice now canvassed the States of the several provinces about the possible suppression of the waardgelders. On his way to Gelderland he was initially refused entry to the city of Utrecht and when he finally was allowed to stay there overnight, Ledenberg had his hotel guarded by civic militia, which was interpreted as an attempt at intimidation.

Because the city of Utrecht appeared first in line to have its waardgelders disarmed, the States of Utrecht sent a delegation to The Hague to discuss the matter with Maurice, of which Ledenberg was a prominent member. He collaborated with Jacob Taurinus, who subjected the oration of Dudley Carleton in the States General. Instead of seeking out Maurice, however, this delegation engaged in conversations with prominent members of the Remonstrant party in Holland, like Hugo Grotius, Rombout Hogerbeets and the pensionary of Haarlem, De Haan. They discussed several objections against the proposed suppression of the waardgelders with members of the States of Holland in an informal meeting at the house of the clerk of the States, which led to agreement to oppose the suppression. The Utrecht delegation then returned home without having seen Maurice. Next, Ledenberg convinced the States of Utrecht to adopt this policy and he also tried to thwart the march of federal troops to Utrecht after the disbanding of the waardgelders had been authorized by the States-General. These activities clearly marked him as an opponent of Maurice.

After Maurice had taken over Utrecht and disbanded the waardgelders there at the end of July 1618, Ledenberg resigned his offices and fled to Gouda. When he returned to Utrecht he was placed under house arrest and finally arrested together with Oldenbarnevelt, Grotius, Hogerbeets and De Haan on 29 August 1618. He was locked up in the Binnenhof at The Hague, but was allowed the company of his son. The preliminary investigation in his trial was conducted by the fiscal (prosecutor) Van Leeuwen, who was a personal enemy (Ledenberg had engineered his dismissal a few years earlier). Van Leeuwen apparently threatened him with the rack and this may have driven Ledenberg to despair. He committed suicide by cutting his throat on the night of 28/29 September. He had left a suicide note in French with his son which indicated that he hoped to prevent forfeiture of his possessions in this way, because he expected his trial to end with his death.

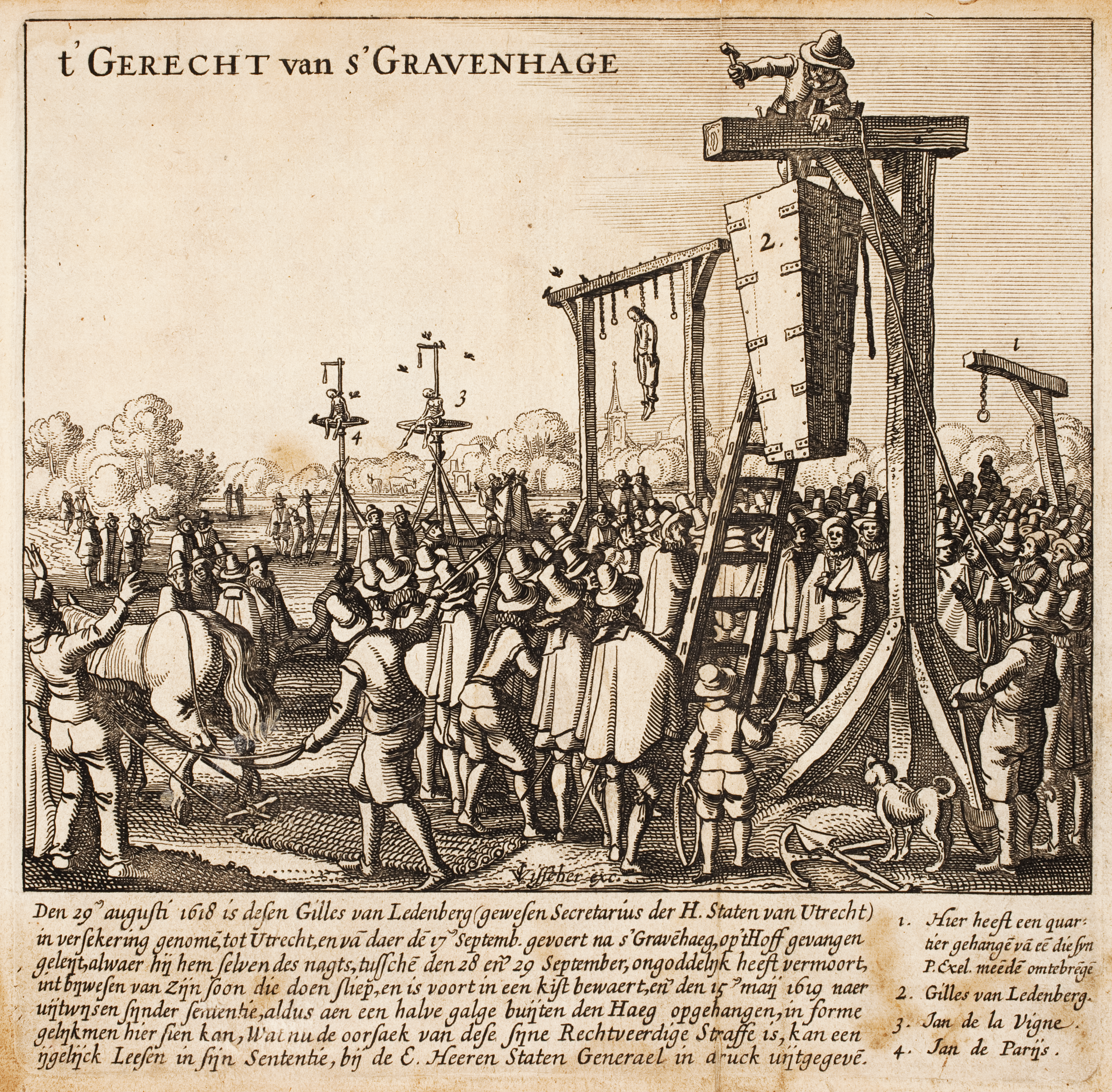
The posthumous hanging of Gilles van Ledenberg

However, his death did not prevent the judicial commission that tried the other "conspirators" to convict him, together with Oldenbarnevelt, on 12 May 1619. Like Oldenbarnevelt he was sentenced to death, and forfeiture, and the sentence was executed posthumously by hanging his embalmed body, in its coffin, from a gibbet. It was left hanging for 21 days, and after it was taken down, it was buried in the churchyard of the church at Voorburg. However, the same night a mob disinterred the corpse and threw it in a ditch. This caused sufficient revulsion to cause the Hof van Holland (the main Dutch court) to issue an injunction against further depredations. The body was later secretly reburied in a chapel belonging to his son-in-law, Adam van Lokhorst.

== Notes and references ==
=== Sources ===
- (in Dutch) "Ledenberg, Gilles van," in: Kok, J. (1789) Vaderlandsch Woordenboek. Tweeëntwintigste Deel, pp. 32-35
- (in Dutch) "Ledenbergh (Gilles van)," in: Aa, A.J. van der, Harderwijk, K.J.R. van, Schotel, G.D.J. (1865) Biographisch woordenboek der Nederlanden: bevattende levensbeschrijvingen van zoodanige personen, die zich op eenigerlei wijze in ons vanderland hebben vermaard gemaakt. Deel 11, pp. 231-234
- "Sententie, uyt-ghesproocken ende ghepronuncieert over Gielis van Ledenberch, ghewesen secretaris vande heeren Staten van Vtrecht: ende over desselfs cadaver geexecuteert den vijfthienden may, anno sesthien-hondert neghenthien, stilo novo". Google Books (in Dutch). Hillebrant Iacobssz. 1619.
