= Loevestein Castle =

Dutch medieval castle in Zaltbommel

- Slot Loevestein
- Poederoijen, the Netherlands
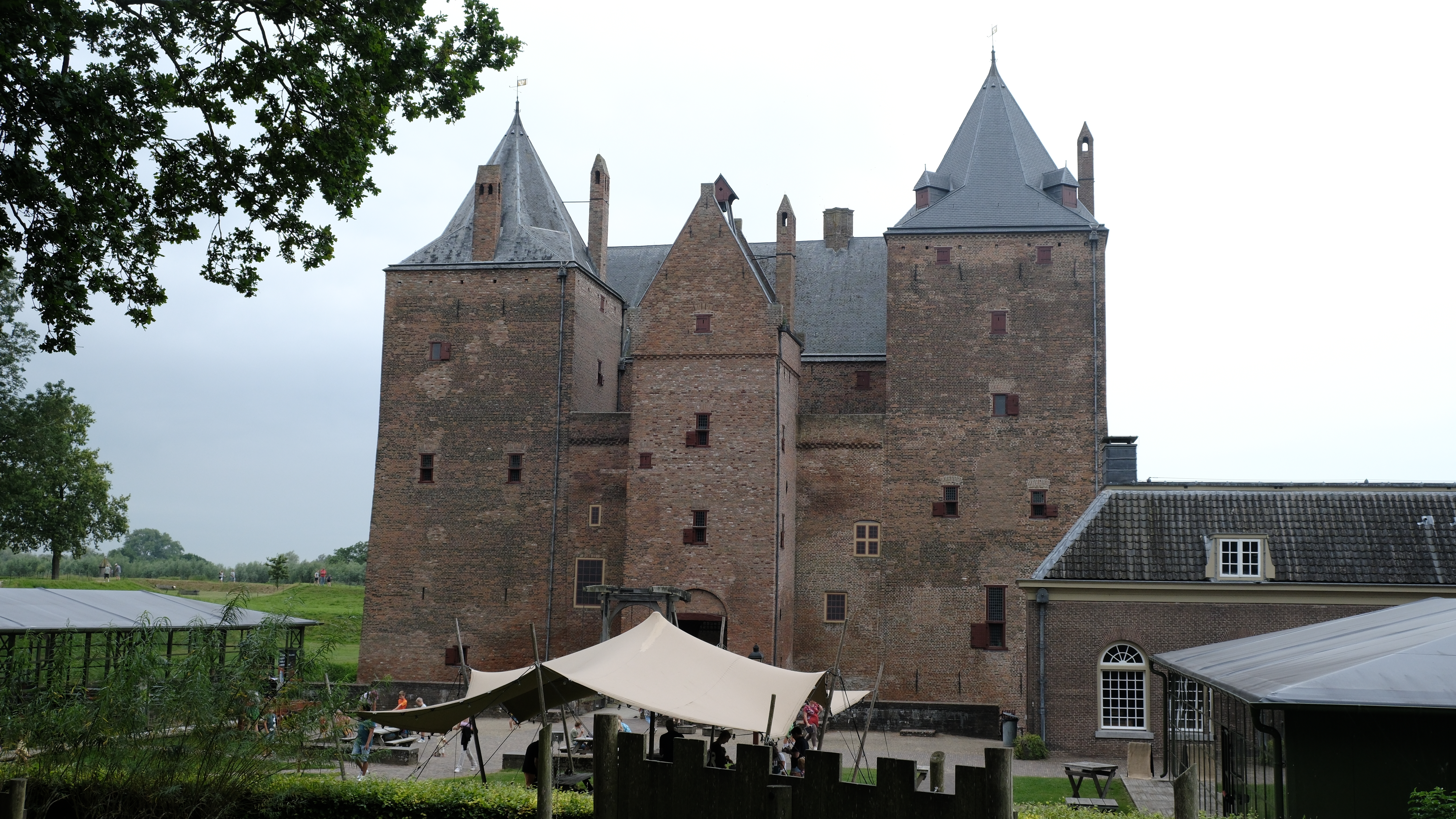
- Slot Loevestein

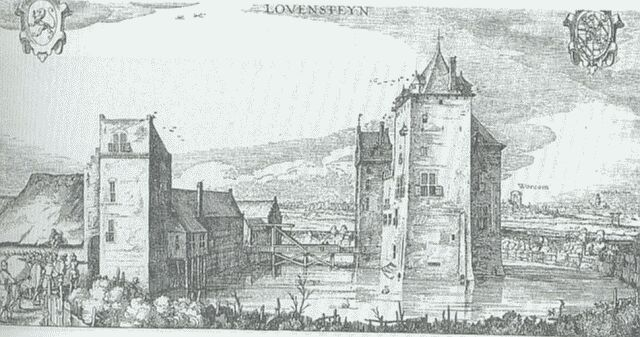
- Slot Loevestein (1621)

Site information
- Type: Castle
- Open to the public: Yes
- Condition: Good
- Website: www.slotloevestein.nl

Location
- The Netherlands
- Coordinates: 51.8164°N 5.0214°E

Site history
- Built: 1361
- Built by: Dirk Loef of Horne

Loevestein Castle (Dutch: Slot Loevestein [ˈslɔt ˈluvəstɛin]) is a medieval castle in the municipality of Zaltbommel, Gelderland, the Netherlands.

The castle was built by the knight Dirk Loef of Horne (hence "Loef's stein" (stone) house) between 1357 and 1397. Until World War II Loevestein Castle was part of the Dutch Waterline, the main Dutch defense line that was based on flooding an area of land south and east of the western provinces. Currently the castle is used as a medieval museum and function centre.

== History ==
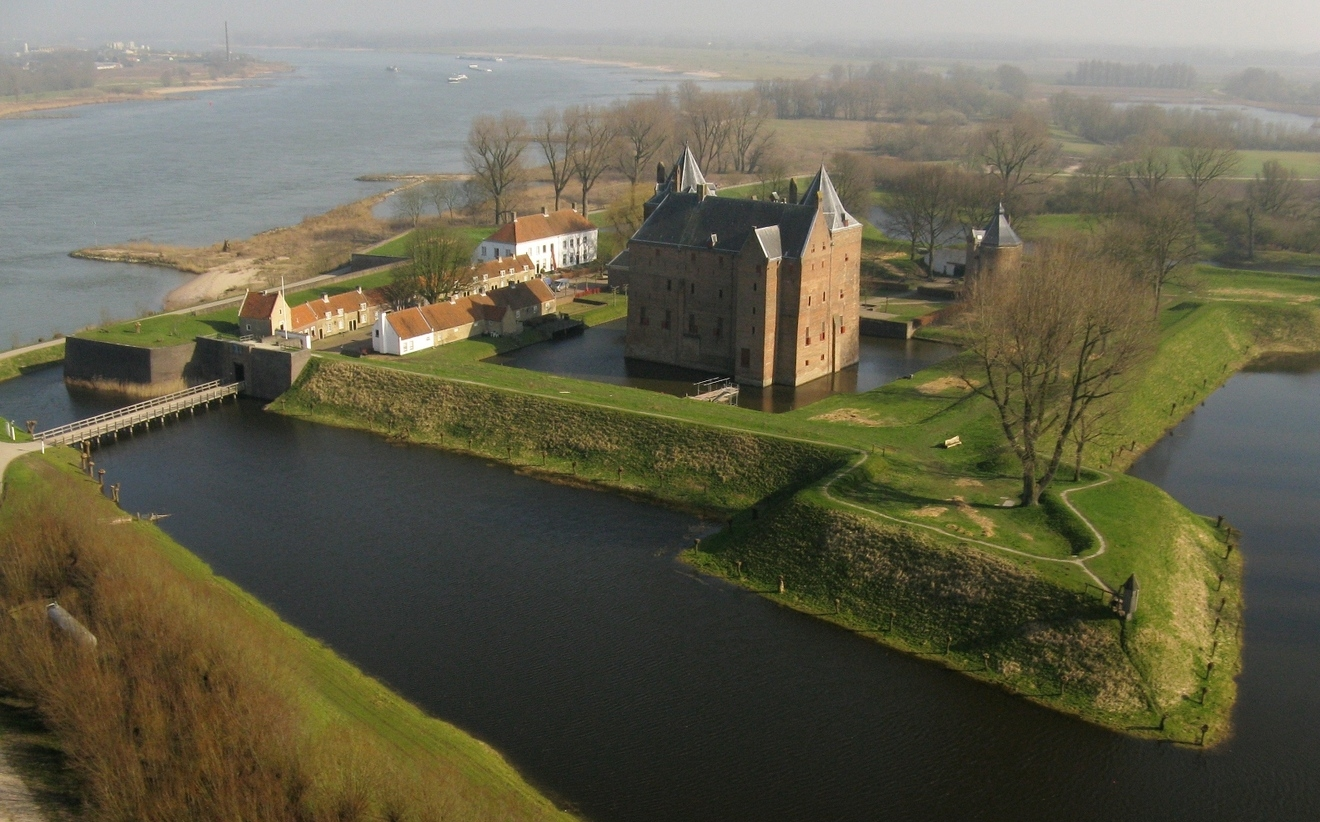
Aerial view of Loevestein Castle.

Loevestein is a water castle that was built between 1357 and 1368. It was built in a strategic location in the middle of the Netherlands, where the Maas and Waal rivers come together (just west of current day villages of Poederoijen and Brakel, in the municipality of Zaltbommel, in Gelderland). At first it was a simple square brick building, used to extract tolls from trading vessels plying the rivers. By 1372, the castle was under control of the Counts of Holland. In the 16th century (around 1575, on orders given by William the Silent) it was expanded to a larger fortress surrounded by earthen fortifications with two (later three) stone bastions on the northern side, two moats, an arsenal, and barracks for a commander and soldiers, and castle was integrated into the Hollandic Water Line.

It changed hands twice between the Northern Dutch and the Spanish during the Eighty Years' War: first on December 9, 1570, it was taken by the Geuzen, then ten days later by the Spanish; on June 25, 1572, it was retaken by the Dutch.

From 1619 the castle became a prison for political prisoners. One famous inmate was the eminent lawyer, poet and politician Hugo de Groot (Hugo Grotius) often presented as the "father of modern international law", who was serving a controversially imposed life sentence from 1619, over his involvement in the controversies over religious policy of the Dutch Republic. In 1621, his wife Maria van Reigersberch, who was also staying at the castle, hid with him in a book chest that was regularly brought for them. He subsequently became the Swedish Ambassador to France for 10 years. Another high-profile inmate was the English Vice-Admiral George Ayscue.

== In literature ==
In Alexandre Dumas, père's novel La Tulipe Noire, the main character Cornelius Van Baerle is imprisoned at Loevestein.

== See also ==
- Loevestein faction
- List of castles in the Netherlands

== Gallery ==
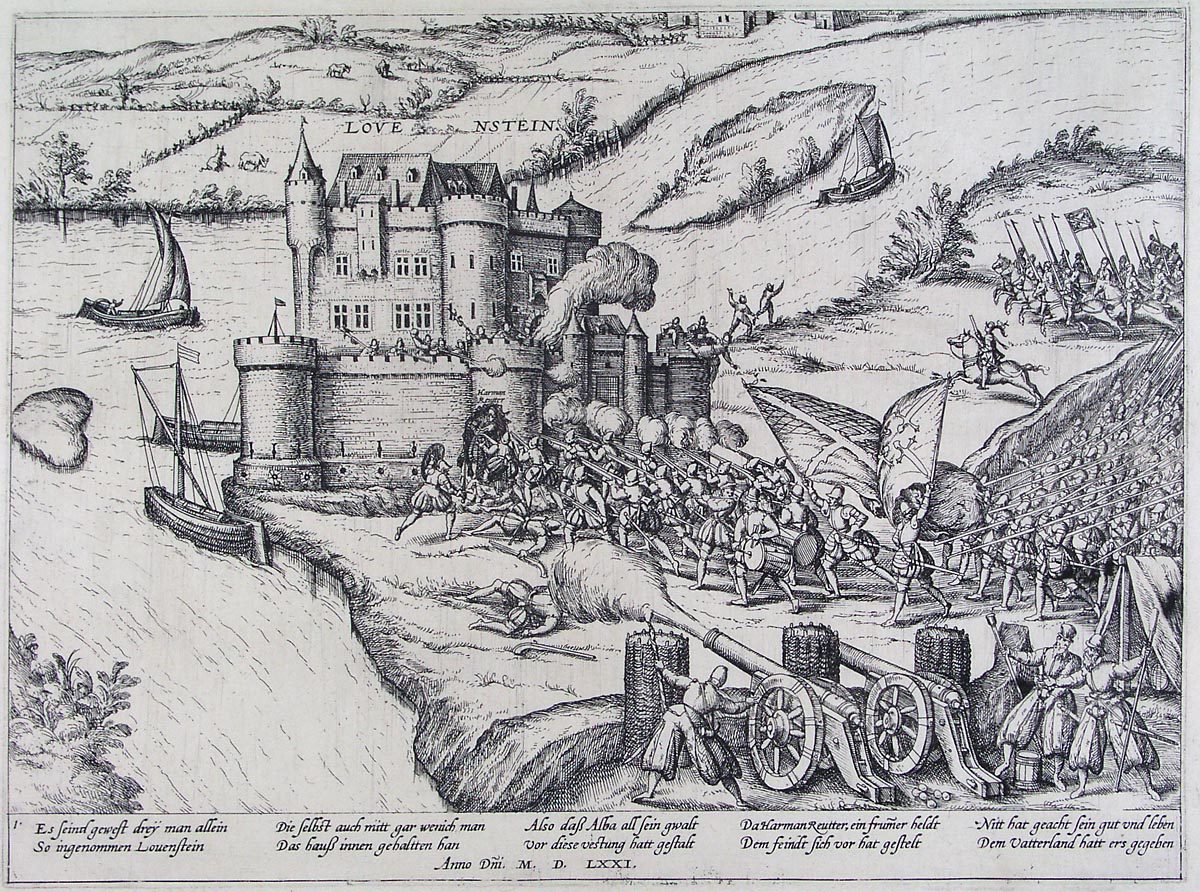
Siege of Loevestein during the Eighty Years' War, 1570

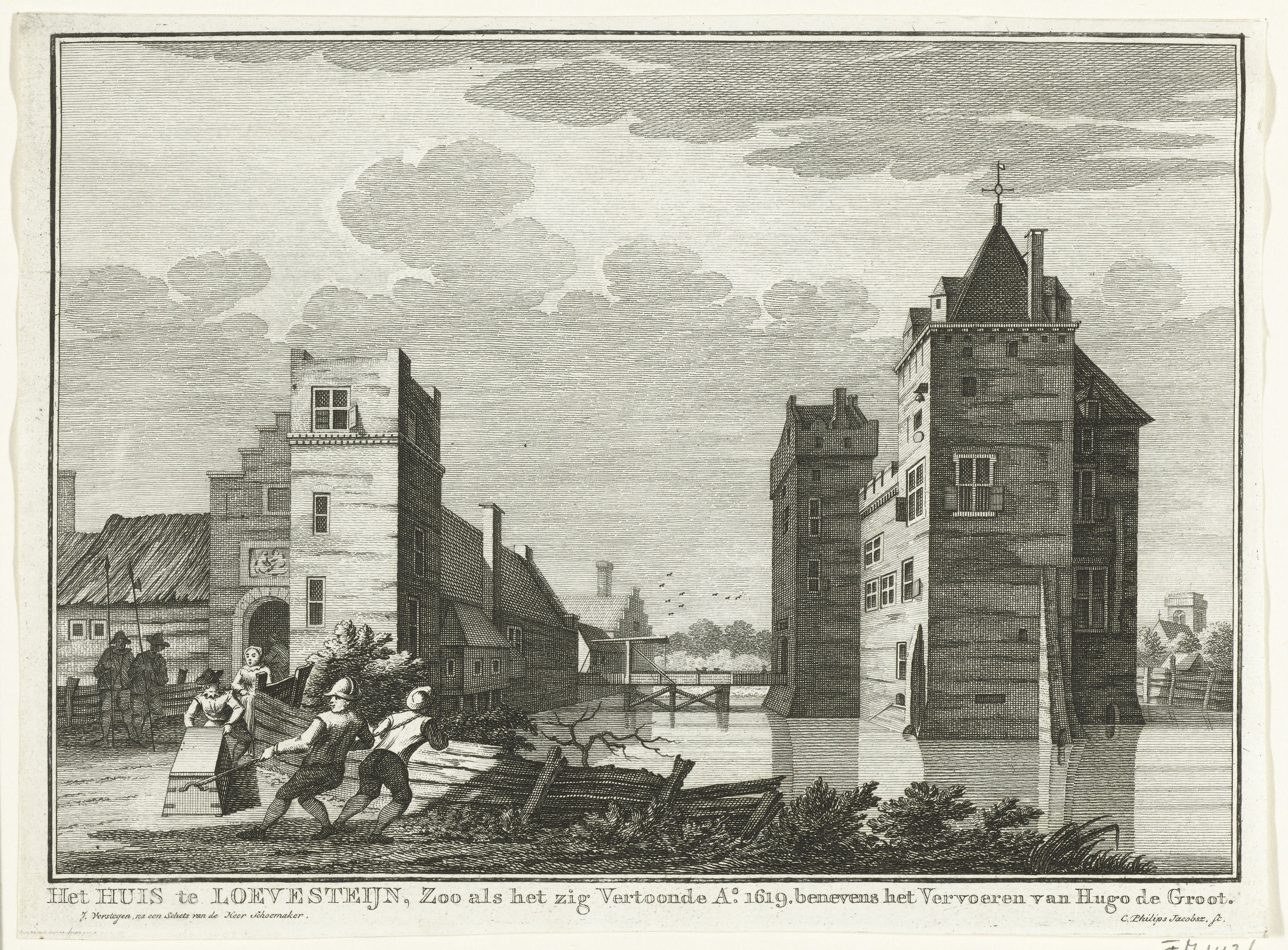
Loevestein Castle at the time of Hugo Grotius' imprisonment in 1618–21

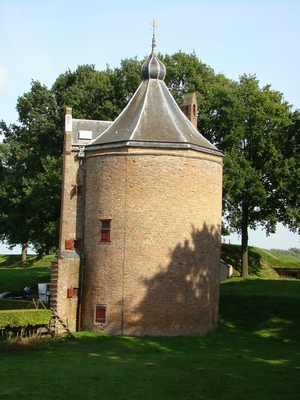
Gunpowder tower at castle Loevestein.

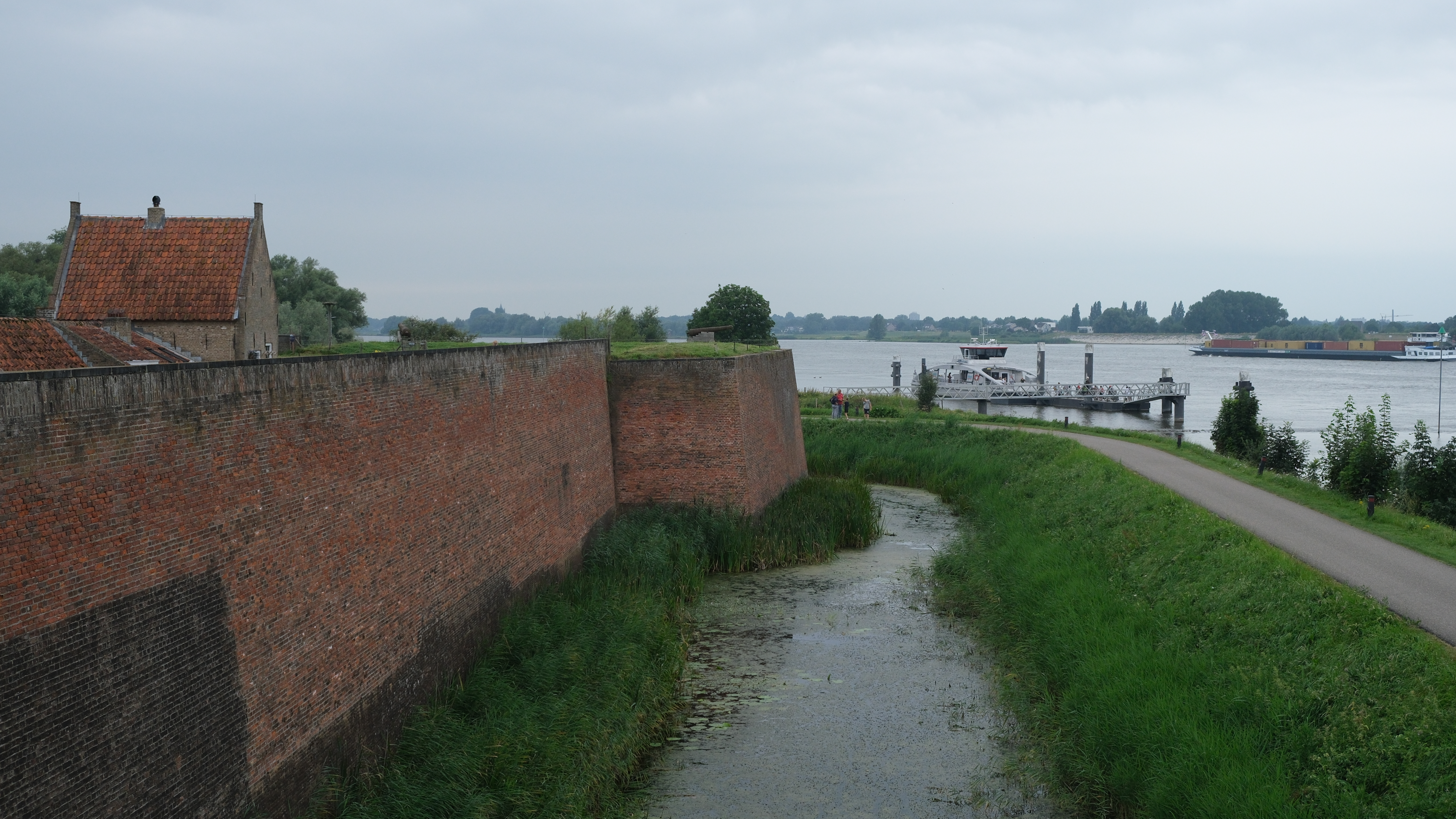
Wall

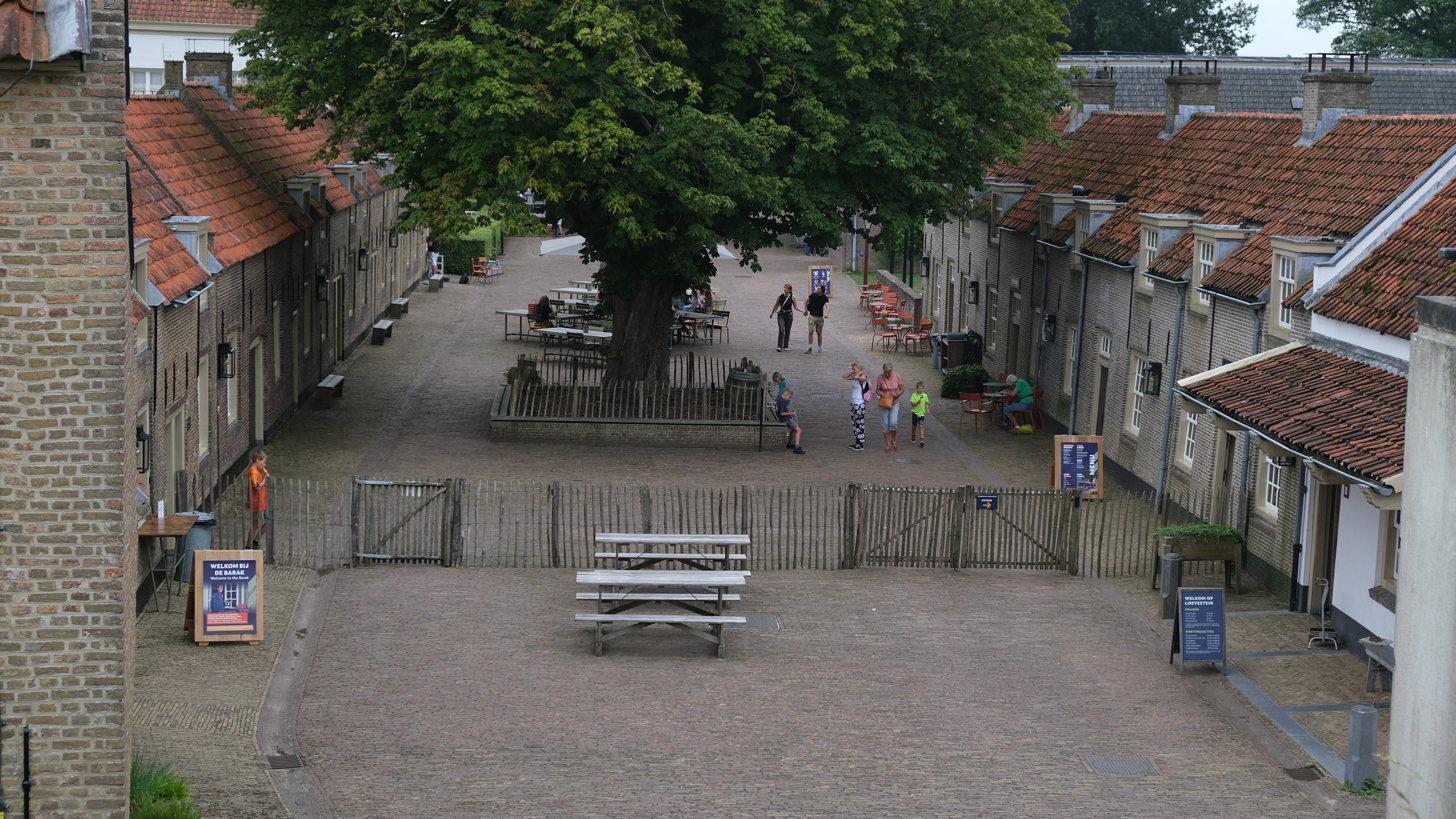
Former service houses

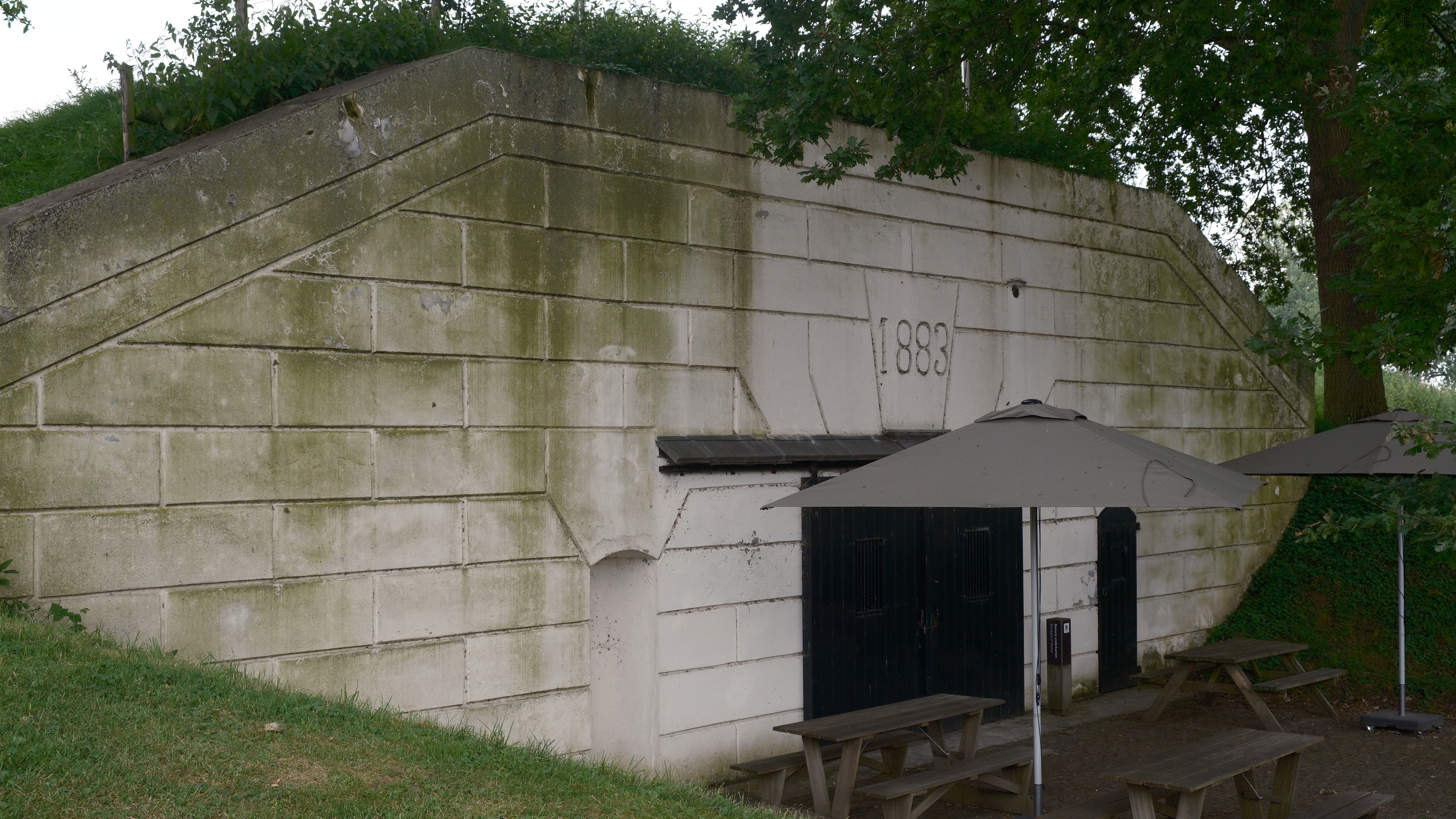
Remise

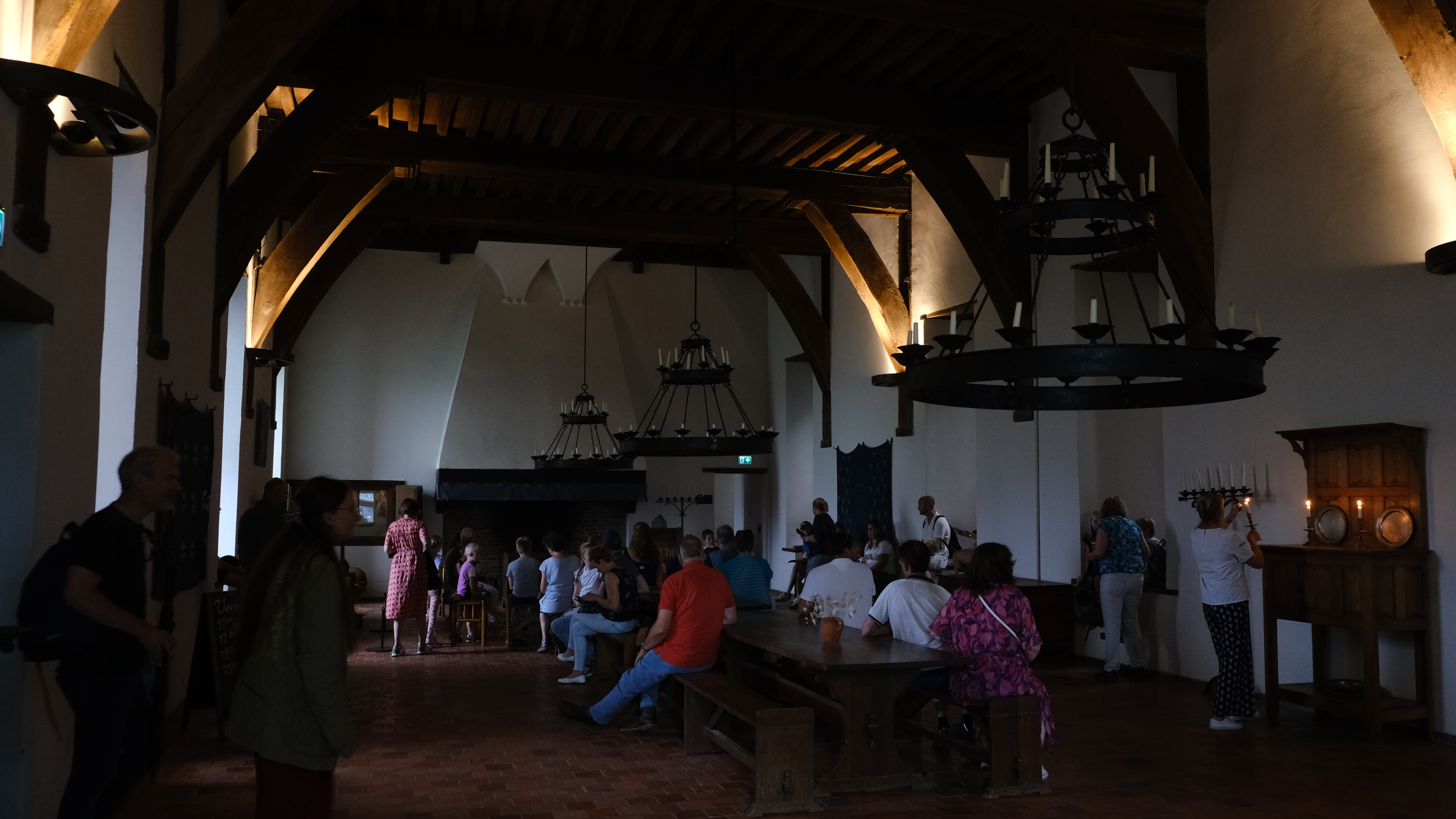
Interior of the castle

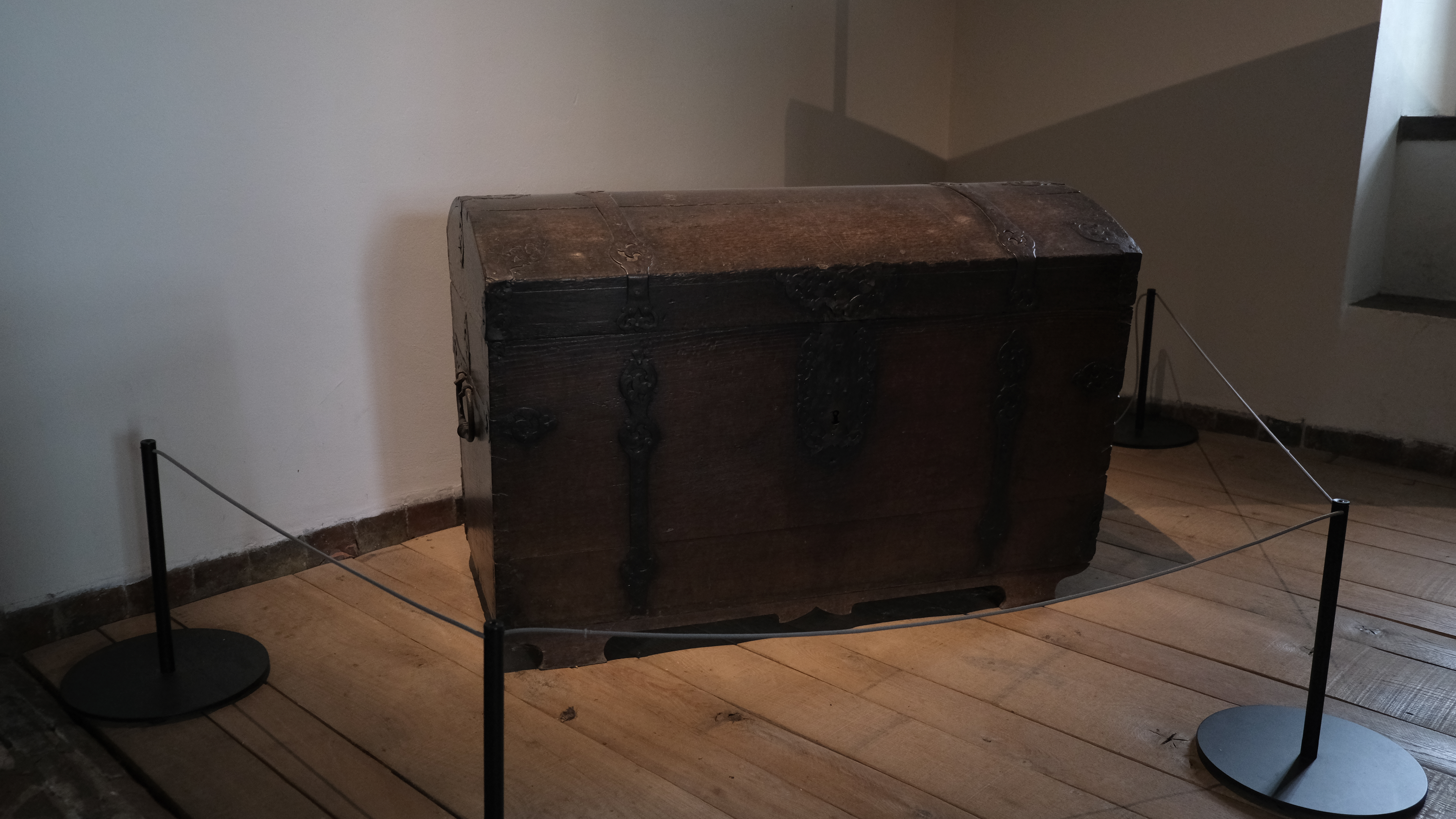
Trunk that allegedly was used by De Groot to flee the castle

== Literature ==
- Kransber, D; Mils, H. (1979). Kastelengids van Nederland, Middeleeuwen. Bussum. ISBN 90-228-3856-0.
- Kalkwiek, K.A.; Schellart, A.I.J.M.; Jansen, H.P.H.; Geudeke, P.W. (1980). Atlas van de Nederlandse kastelen. Alphen aan den Rijn. ISBN 90-218-2477-9.
- Helsdingen, H.W. van (1966). Gids voor de Nederlandse kastelen en buitenplaatsen. Amsterdam.
- Tromp, H.M.J. (1979). Kijk op kastelen. Amsterdam. ISBN 90-10-02446-6.
- "Loevestein Castle". Holland.com.
