= James Brown Scott =

American legal scholar (1866–1943)

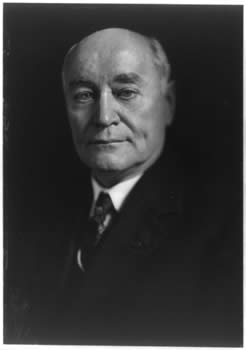
- James Brown Scott As Scott appeared on his book published in 1922, 'Adventures in Internationalism: A Biography of James Brown Scott'
- Born: James Brown Scott; June 3, 1866; Kincardine, Canada West
- Died: June 25, 1943 (aged 77); Annapolis, Maryland, United States
- Education: Harvard University
- Occupations: Jurist, legal educator

James Brown Scott (June 3, 1866 – June 25, 1943) was an American legal scholar. He founded the law school at University of Southern California and was professor of law at the University of Illinois, Columbia University, George Washington University, and Georgetown University. He was editor in chief of the American Journal of International Law, played a key role in founding the American Society of International Law, and was an expert to the United States delegation at the Second Hague Peace Conference.

== Early life ==
Scott was born in Kincardine, Canada West, to American parents who were temporarily visiting the town. He was raised in Philadelphia, Pennsylvania.

He was educated at Harvard University (A.B., 1890; A.M., 1891). As Parker fellow of Harvard he traveled in Europe and studied in Berlin, Heidelberg (J.U.D.), and Paris. In 1893, he visited Egypt where he met Columbia University professor Nicholas Murray Butler.

== Career ==
Following his return to the United States, Scott practiced law in Los Angeles, California, from 1894 to 1899. He founded the law school at the University of Southern California in 1896, and was its dean until 1899 when his participation in the Spanish–American War interrupted that role.

He was dean of the college of law at the University of Illinois (1899–1903), professor of law at Columbia, and professor of law at George Washington University (1905–06). In 1907 he was expert on international law to the United States delegation at the Second Hague Peace Conference. He also served on a State Department commission which made recommendations to Congress on the reform of United States nationality law, which would result in the Expatriation Act of 1907.

From 1908 to 1916, he lectured at Johns Hopkins. From 1921 to 1940, he was chair of international law and international relations at the Georgetown School of Foreign Service.

He served as secretary of the Carnegie Endowment for International Peace, and wrote several works on the Hague Conferences of 1899 and 1907 (1908, 1909, 1915). Besides serving as editor in chief of the American Journal of International Law and as editor of the American Case Book, and writing numerous articles on international law and the peace movement.

He also was the champion of the Spanish school of international law of the 16th century, claiming that writers like Francisco de Vitoria and Suarez had already said about that department of the law what about a century later was stated by Hugo Grotius in his De iure belli ac pacis (About the law of war and peace).

At the end of World War I, he was appointed to the American Commission to Negotiate Peace. He subsequently served on the drafting committee at the Paris Peace Conference.

Scott was elected to the American Philosophical Society in 1930 and the American Academy of Arts and Sciences in 1935.

== Works ==
- Cases on International Law (1 ed.). Boston: Boston Book Company. 1902 – via Internet Archive..
- Cases on Quasi Contracts (1 ed.). New York: Baker, Voorhis & Company. 1905 – via Internet Archive..
- Cases on Equity Jurisdiction (1 ed.). New York: Baker, Voorhis & Company. 1906 – via Internet Archive..
- Argument of the Honorable Elihu Root on Behalf of the United States: Before the North Atlantic Coast Fisheries Arbitration Tribunal at The Hague, 1910 (1 ed.). World Peace Foundation. 1912..
- The Status of the International Court of Justice (1 ed.). New York: Oxford University Press. 1914 – via Internet Archive..
- The Controversy over Neutral Rights between the United States and France, 1797-1800. 1917. Oxford University Press.
- The Armed Neutralities of 1780 and 1800. 1918. Oxford University Press.
- The United States: A Study in International Organization (1 ed.). New York: Oxford University Press. 1920 – via Internet Archive..
- The Catholic conception of international law (1 ed.). Washington, D.C.: Georgetown University Press. 1934 – via Internet Archive.
- The Spanish Origin of International Law-Francisco De Vitoria and His Law of Nations.
