= Viñuales =

Viñuales is a Spanish surname. It may refer to

- Agustín Viñuales (1881–1959), Spanish lawyer, economist and politician who was briefly Minister of Finance in 1933
- Jorge E. Viñuales (born 1976), Professor of Law and Environmental Policy at the University of Cambridge
