= T. Alexander Aleinikoff =

American dean

Thomas Alexander Aleinikoff (born 1952) is an American law professor who is the executive dean of The New School for Social Research and University Professor at The New School in New York City. He was previously director of the Zolberg Institute on Migration and Mobility at The New School and a law professor and dean at Georgetown University Law Center in Washington, D.C. From 2010 to 2015, Aleinikoff was the Deputy High Commissioner in the Office of the United Nations High Commissioner for Refugees in Geneva, Switzerland. In 2016, he was a visiting professor of law at the Columbia Law School and Huo Global Policy Initiative Research Fellow at the Columbia Global Policy Initiative.

== Background ==
Aleinikoff attended White Plains Senior High School, and received a bachelor's degree from Swarthmore College in 1974 as a member of Phi Beta Kappa. He then received a J.D. from Yale Law School in 1977. While at Yale, Aleinikoff was editor of the Yale Law Journal. He was a law clerk to Judge Edward Weinfeld of the United States District Court for the Southern District of New York, and from 1981 to 1987 was on the faculty of the University of Michigan Law School.

Aleinikoff joined the law faculty of Georgetown University Law Center in 1997. From 2003 to 2004, Aleinikoff was associate dean of the Law Center and was named dean of the Law Center and executive vice president of Georgetown University in 2004.

Aleinikoff specializes in immigration policy, and has written a number of books on the topic. He has been a senior associate at the Migration Policy Institute, executive associate commissioner of programs, Immigration and Naturalization Service (INS) at the U.S. Department of Justice (it is now part of the Department of Homeland Security), and general counsel of the INS. Aleinikoff was co-chair of the Immigration Policy Review Team for the Presidential transition of Barack Obama.

On December 2, 2009, Aleinikoff notified students and faculty of his intention to accept appointment as Deputy High Commissioner of Office of the United Nations High Commissioner for Refugees (UNHCR).

As executive associate commissioner at the INS, Aleinikoff oversaw program development from 1995 to 1997. Prior to that, as general counsel for the INS from 1994 to 1995, he participated in decisions that included reform of the US asylum process.

== Selected books ==
- Migration and International Legal Norms (T. Alexander Aleinikoff & Vincent Chetail eds., The Hague: T.M.C. Asser 2003).
- Immigration and Citizenship: Process and Policy (with David A. Martin and Hiroshi Motomura) (West Group 5th ed. forthcoming 2003).
- Migration and International Law, ed. (Associated Press, forthcoming 2003).
- Semblances of Sovereignty: The Constitution, the State, and American Citizenship (Harvard U. Press 2002).
- New Narratives on the Peopling of America: Immigration, Race, and Dispossession, ed. with Alexandra Délano Alonso (HFS Books, 2024)

== Selected journal articles ==
- "Detaining Plenary Power: The Meaning and Impact of Zadvydas v. Davis," 16 Geo. Immigr. L.J. 365 (2002).
- "Securing Tribal Sovereignty: A Theory for Overturning Lone Wolf," 38 Tulsa L. Rev. 57 (2002).
- "American Citizenship: An Introduction," 5 Citizenship Stud. 5 (2001).
- "Citizenship Talk: A Revisionist Narrative," 69 Fordham L. Rev. 1689 (2001).
- "Between National and Post-National: Membership in the United States," 4 Mich. J. Race & L. 241 (1999).
- With Rubén G. Rumbaut, "Terms of Belonging: Are Models of Membership Self-fulfilling Prophecies?," 13 Geo. Immig. L.J. 1 (1998).
