= Temperamenta belli =

Latin expression used by Hugo Grotius in De jure belli ac pacis

Temperamenta Belli means moderation in the conduct of war. This term is used in Hugo Grotius's work De jure belli ac pacis (1625) which dealt with international relations. It is also mentioned in works of members of the so-called English School of international relations thought such as Hedley Bull's The Anarchical Society: A Study of Order in World Politics.

Most of the facts about this term is found in the scholarly work of Headly Bull's Anarchical society; a study of order in world politics.

Ideas about ‘just war’, having developed in ancient Rome, were adapted in the centuries after Christ as part of the thinking Western Church. St Augustine (ad 354–430), the most influential of the Western fathers, laid down conditions that had to be satisfied if war was to be permissible. His ideas, later elaborated by St Thomas Aquinas (1226–74), Francisco de Vitoria (1480–1546) and others, formed the background to the work of Grotius, who made an important contribution with his emphasis on the idea of temperamenta belli, i.e. moderation in the conduct of war.
