= Vincent Chetail =

Legal scholar and professor

- Known for: Scholarship on international migration law; founder of the Global Migration Centre

Academic background
- Education: Jean Moulin University Lyon 3 (LLB); Graduate Institute of International and Development Studies (MA); Paris-Panthéon-Assas University (PhD)

Academic work
- Institutions: Graduate Institute of International and Development Studies; University of London (Refugee Law Initiative)

Vincent Chetail is a legal scholar and professor of public international law specializing in international migration law and refugee law at the Geneva Graduate Institute of International and Development Studies in Switzerland. He is also a senior research associate at the University of London's Refugee Law Initiative.

Chetail has held numerous visiting professorships, including at Harvard Law School, the University of Paris XI, Sciences Po, the Hague Academy of International Law and the European University Institute. He has been called by his peers "a leading expert on migration" and one of the "luminaries" of the discipline of international migration law. He started his academic career as an associate professor of public international law at the Geneva campus of Webster University.

== Early life and education ==
Chetail holds a PhD from the Paris-Panthéon-Assas University, a master's from the Graduate Institute of International and Development Studies and a bachelor's in law from Jean Moulin University Lyon 3.

== Career ==
Chetail is emeritus editor-in-chief of the academic journal Refugee Survey Quarterly, published by Oxford University Press, and member of the Oxford Bibliographies in International Law's founding editorial board. He founded the Global Migration Centre, a research center at the Geneva Graduate Institute. In 2019, Chetail became president of the board of the Geneva Academy of International Humanitarian Law and Human Rights, succeeding Nicolas Michel.

In 2020, the United Nations' International Organization for Migration appointed Chetail as an Migration Research and Publishing High-Level Advisers.

He is frequently cited in the media for his views on issues of forced migration in Europe and refugee law.

== Select publications ==
- International Migration Law, (Oxford, Oxford University Press) (2019) 449p
- Post-Conflict Peacebuilding: A Lexicon, (Oxford, Oxford University Press) (2019) 344p
- Unity and Diversity of International Law (Leiden/Boston, Martinus Nijhoff Publishers) co-edited with D. Alland, O. de Frouville & Jorge E. Viñuales (2014) 1007p
- The Roots of International Law (Boston/Leiden, Martinus Nijhoff Publishers) co-edited with Pierre-Marie Dupuy (2013) 764p
- Privatizing War: Private Military and Security Companies under Public International Law (Cambridge, Cambridge University Press) co-authored with L. Cameron (2013) 720p
