= 9994 Grotius =

Rafita asteroid

- Orbit of Grotius (blue), inner planets and Jupiter (outermost)

Discovery
- Discovered by: C. J. van Houten; I. van Houten-G. T. Gehrels
- Discovery site: Palomar Obs.
- Discovery date: 24 September 1960

Designations
- Pronunciation: /ˈɡroʊʃiəs/
- Named after: Hugo Grotius (Dutch jurist)
- Alternative designations: 4028 P-L · 1981 WH_{9}
- Minor planet category: main-belt · (middle); Rafita

Orbital characteristics
- Epoch 4 September 2017 (JD 2458000.5)
- Uncertainty parameter 0
- Observation arc: 55.59 yr (20,306 days)
- Aphelion: 3.0391 AU
- Perihelion: 2.1307 AU
- Semi-major axis: 2.5849 AU
- Eccentricity: 0.1757
- Orbital period (sidereal): 4.16 yr (1,518 days)
- Mean anomaly: 204.01°
- Mean motion: 0° 14^{m} 13.92^{s} / day
- Inclination: 7.1806°
- Longitude of ascending node: 207.15°
- Argument of perihelion: 224.33°

Physical characteristics
- Dimensions: 3.38 km (calculated); 3.746±0.146 km
- Synodic rotation period: 9.219±0.0067 h
- Geometric albedo: 0.20 (assumed); 0.263±0.040
- Spectral type: S
- Absolute magnitude (H): 14.2 · 14.273±0.007 (R) · 14.3 · 14.48±0.45 · 14.72

9994 Grotius /ˈɡroʊʃiəs/, provisional designation 4028 P-L, is a stony Rafita asteroid from the middle regions of the asteroid belt, approximately 3.5 kilometers in diameter. It was discovered during the Palomar–Leiden survey in 1960, and named after Dutch jurist Hugo Grotius.

== Discovery ==
Grotius was discovered on 24 September 1960, by the Dutch astronomers Ingrid and Cornelis van Houten, on photographic plates taken by Dutch–American astronomer Tom Gehrels at Palomar Observatory in California, United States.

=== Survey designation ===
The survey designation "P-L" stands for Palomar–Leiden, named after Palomar Observatory and Leiden Observatory, which collaborated on the fruitful Palomar–Leiden survey in the 1960s. Gehrels used Palomar's Samuel Oschin telescope (also known as the 48-inch Schmidt Telescope), and shipped the photographic plates to Ingrid and Cornelis van Houten at Leiden Observatory where astrometry was carried out. The trio are credited with the discovery of several thousand minor planets.

== Orbit and classification ==
Grotius orbits the Sun in the central main-belt at a distance of 2.1–3.0 AU once every 4 years and 2 months (1,518 days). Its orbit has an eccentricity of 0.18 and an inclination of 7° with respect to the ecliptic. The body's observation arc begins with its official discovery observation at Palomar.

=== Rotation period ===
In August 2010, a rotational lightcurve of Grotius was obtained from photometric observations in the R-band at the Palomar Transient Factory in California. Lightcurve analysis gave a rotation period of 9.2189 hours with a brightness variation of 0.27 magnitude (U=2).

=== Diameter and albedo ===
According to the survey carried out by the NEOWISE mission of NASA's Wide-field Infrared Survey Explorer, Grotius measures 3.746 kilometers in diameter and its surface has an albedo of 0.263. The Collaborative Asteroid Lightcurve Link assumes a standard albedo for stony asteroids of 0.20 and calculates a diameter of 3.38 kilometers based on an absolute magnitude of 14.72.

== Naming ==
This minor planet was named for Dutch jurist Hugo Grotius (1583–1645), who laid the foundations for international law, based on natural law. He was a child prodigy and entered Leiden University when he was just eleven years old. The approved naming citation was published by the Minor Planet Center on 11 November 2000 (M.P.C. 41571).
