= American Society of International Law =

Professional association

American Society of International Law (ASIL)

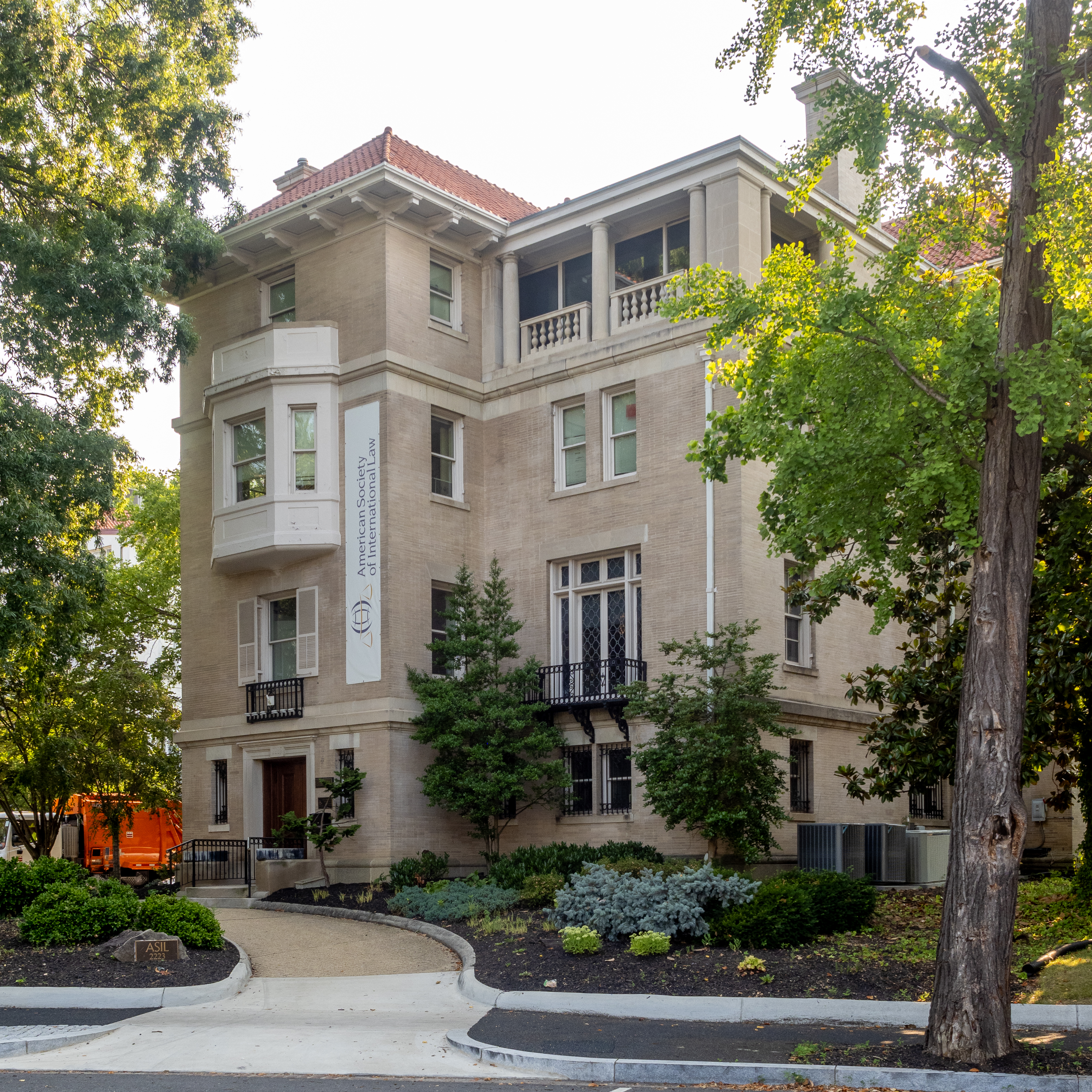
- The society's headquarters on Massachusetts Avenue at Sheridan Circle
- Formation: 1906; 120 years ago
- Headquarters: 2223 Massachusetts Avenue NW, Washington, D.C. 20008
- Website: https://www.asil.org/

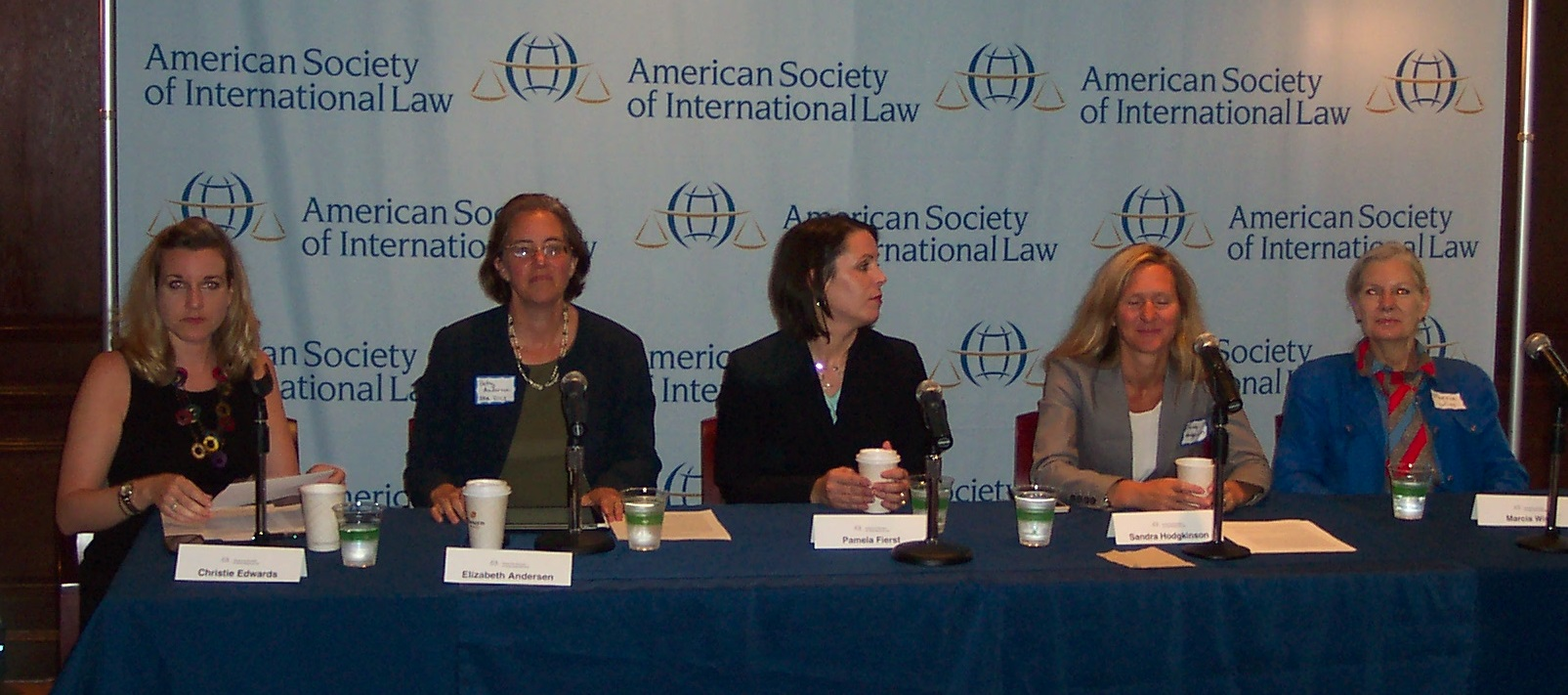
At American Society of International Law Women's Interest Group panel discussion on 31 August 2014, (l—r) Christine Edwards, Elizabeth Anderson, Pamela Fierst, Sandra L. Hodgkinson, and Marcia Wiss discuss international law and careers.

The American Society of International Law (ASIL) is a professional association of international lawyers in the United States. The organization was founded in 1906. After the Lake Mohonk Conference on International Arbitration, some participants felt the need for a society devoted to international law separate from international arbitration. Participants in a meeting held on December 9, 1905, at the residence of Oscar S. Straus agreed to establish the ASIL.

The first annual meeting of the association was in Washington, D.C., on April 19–20, 1907. Elihu Root was the first president of the ASIL, serving in that position until his retirement in 1924. Charles Evans Hughes was president from 1924 to 1929 when he became judge on the Permanent Court of International Justice at The Hague.

The organization was chartered by the United States Congress in 1950 to foster the study of international law, and to promote the establishment and maintenance of international relations on the basis of law and justice. ASIL holds Category II Consultative Status to the United Nations Economic and Social Council (UNESCO), and is a constituent society of the American Council of Learned Societies.

ASIL is headquartered in Washington, D.C. Until 1911, the offices were in the home of James Brown Scott, a key figure in the association. In 1911, the offices of the association was moved to the Carnegie Endowment for International Peace.

Among the Society's publications are The American Journal of International Law (published quarterly), International Legal Materials (published every other month since 1962), Benchbook on International Law, and Proceedings of the ASIL Annual Meeting.

== See also ==
- American Society of Comparative Law
- Grotius Lectures (annual lecture series sponsored by the ASIL)
