= American Journal of International Law =

The American Journal of International Law
- Discipline: International law
- Language: English

Publication details
- History: 1907–present
- Publisher: Cambridge University Press for the American Society of International Law (United States)
- Frequency: Quarterly
- Impact factor: 1.667 (2014)

Standard abbreviations
- Bluebook: Am. J. Int'l L.
- ISO 4: Am. J. Int. Law

Indexing
- ISSN: 0002-9300
- JSTOR: 00029300

Links
- Journal homepage

The American Journal of International Law is an English-language scholarly journal focusing on international law and international relations, published by American Society of International Law (ASIL). It has been published quarterly since 1907. The Journal primarily publishes a few research articles per issue. Additionally, it publishes summaries and analyses of decisions from national and international courts, arbitral tribunals, and other tribunals, as well as analyses of contemporary U.S. practice in international law.

The Society's history and contributions to international law are chronicled in Frederic L. Kirgis, The American Society of International Law's First Century: 1906–2006 " (Brill, 2006).

According to the Journal Citation Reports, the journal has a 2014 impact factor of 1.667, ranking it 14th out of 85 journals in the category "International Relations".

The first managing editor was James Brown Scott, professor of law at George Washington University. The first issue was published in January 1907. The cost of publishing the two first issues was paid by Scott.

== See also ==
- European Journal of International Law
- List of law journals
- List of international relations journals
- Grotius Lectures
