= Grotius Lectures =

American lecture series

The Grotius Lectures is a series of annual lectures sponsored by the American Society of International Law and American University Washington College of Law since 1999. The lecture is named in honour of the famous Dutch jurist, Hugo Grotius (1583–1645), considered by many to be the 'father of international law.' Over the past decade, the lecture has been delivered by a leading international law scholar or international lawyer. The lecture is customarily read at the opening of the annual meeting of the ASIL, usually held in late March or April each year.

Grotius Lecture
	Date	Speaker	Title	ASIL Annual Meeting
01	1999	Christopher Weeramantry & Nathaniel Berman	Tribute to Grotius	93rd
02	2000	Kader Asmal	International Law and Practice, Dealing with the Past in the SA Experience	94th
03	2001	Jean Bethke Elshtain	Just War and Humanitarian Intervention	95th
04	2002	Moisés Naím	Five Wars of Globalization	96th
05	2003	Mary Robinson	Globalization (The Role of Human Rights)	97th
06	2004	Amy Chua	World on Fire	98th
07	2005	Michael Kirby	International Law - the Impact on National Constitutions	99th
08	2006	B.S. Chimni	A Just World Under Law: a View from the South	100th
09	2007	Joseph Stiglitz	Multinational Corporations: Balancing Rights and Responsibilities	101st
10	2008	Zeid Ra'ad Zeid Al-Hussein	For the Love of Country and International Criminal Law	102nd
11	2009	Achim Steiner	International Environmental Law & Transition Towards a Green Economy	103rd
12	2010	Antony Anghie	Should International Law Lead or Follow in Changing Times?	104th
13	2011	Amartya Sen	Harmony and Dissonance in International Law	105th
14	2012	Jakob Kellenberger	Confronting Complexity	106th

The American Grotius Lecture should not be confused with the annual Grotius Lecture held at the British Institute of International and Comparative Law (the successor to the Grotius Society).

== See also ==
- American Society of International Law
- American University, Washington College of Law
- American Journal of International Law
- The American University International Law Review (which publishes the annual Grotius Lecture)
