= Hugo Grotius =

Dutch philosopher and jurist (1583–1645)

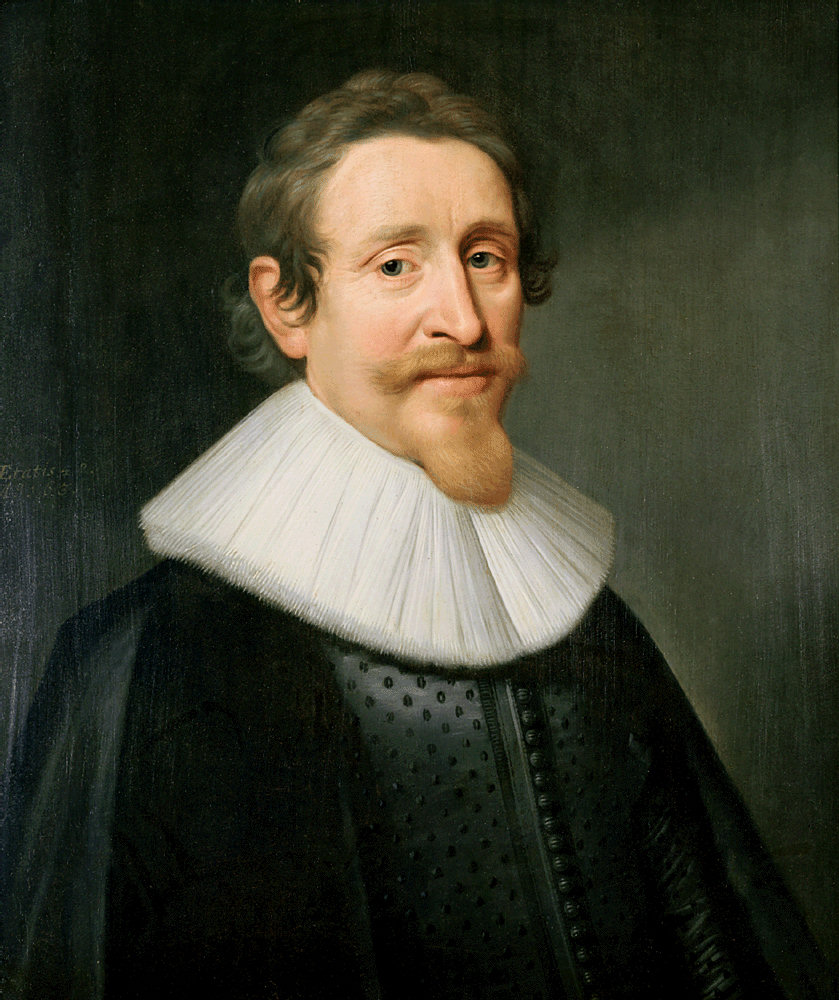
- Portrait of Hugo Grotius by Michiel Jansz. van Mierevelt, 1631
- Born: Huig de Groot; 10 April 1583; Delft, County of Holland, Dutch Republic
- Died: 28 August 1645 (aged 62); Rostock, Duchy of Mecklenburg

Education
- Education: Leiden University
- Academic advisor: Justus Lipsius

Philosophical work
- Era: Renaissance philosophy
- Region: Western philosophy
- School: Natural law theory Renaissance humanism
- Main interests: Philosophy of war, international law, political philosophy
- Notable ideas: Theory of natural rights, grounding just war principles in natural law, governmental theory of atonement

Hugo Grotius (/ˈɡroʊʃiəs/ GROH-shee-əss; 10 April 1583 – 28 August 1645), also known as Hugo de Groot (Note: In this Dutch name, the surname is de Groot, not Groot.) (Dutch: [ˈɦyɣoː də ˈɣroːt]) or Huig de Groot (Dutch: [ˈɦœyx də ˈɣroːt]), was a Dutch humanist, diplomat, lawyer, theologian, jurist, statesman, poet and playwright. A teenage prodigy, he was born in Delft and studied at Leiden University. He was imprisoned in Loevestein Castle for his involvement in the controversies over religious policy of the Dutch Republic, but escaped hidden in a chest of books that was regularly brought to him and was transported to Gorinchem. Grotius wrote most of his major works in exile in France.

Grotius was a major figure in the fields of philosophy, political theory and law during the 16th and 17th centuries. Along with the earlier works of Francisco de Vitoria and Alberico Gentili, his writings laid the foundations for international law. Two of his books have had a lasting impact in the field: De jure belli ac pacis (On the Law of War and Peace) dedicated to Louis XIII of France and the Mare Liberum (The Free Seas) for which Grotius has been called the "father of international law". Grotius has also contributed significantly to the evolution of the notion of rights. Before him, rights were, above all, perceived as attached to objects; after him, they are seen as belonging to persons, as the expression of an ability to act, or as a means of realizing something.

Peter Borschberg suggests that Grotius was significantly influenced by Francisco de Vitoria and the School of Salamanca in Spain, who supported the idea that the sovereignty of a nation does not lie simply in a ruler through God's will, but originates in its people, who agree to confer such authority upon a ruler. It is also thought that Grotius was not the first to formulate the international society doctrine, but he was one of the first to define expressly the idea of one society of states, governed not by force or warfare but by actual laws and mutual agreement to enforce those laws. As Hedley Bull declared in 1990: "The idea of international society which Grotius propounded was given concrete expression in the Peace of Westphalia, and Grotius may be considered the intellectual father of this first general peace settlement of modern times." Additionally, his contributions to Arminian theology helped provide the seeds for later Arminian-based movements, such as Methodism and Pentecostalism; Grotius is acknowledged as a significant figure in the Arminian–Calvinist debate. Because of his theological underpinning of free trade, he is also considered an "economic theologist".

After fading over time, the influence of Grotius's ideas revived in the 20th century following the First World War.

== Early life ==
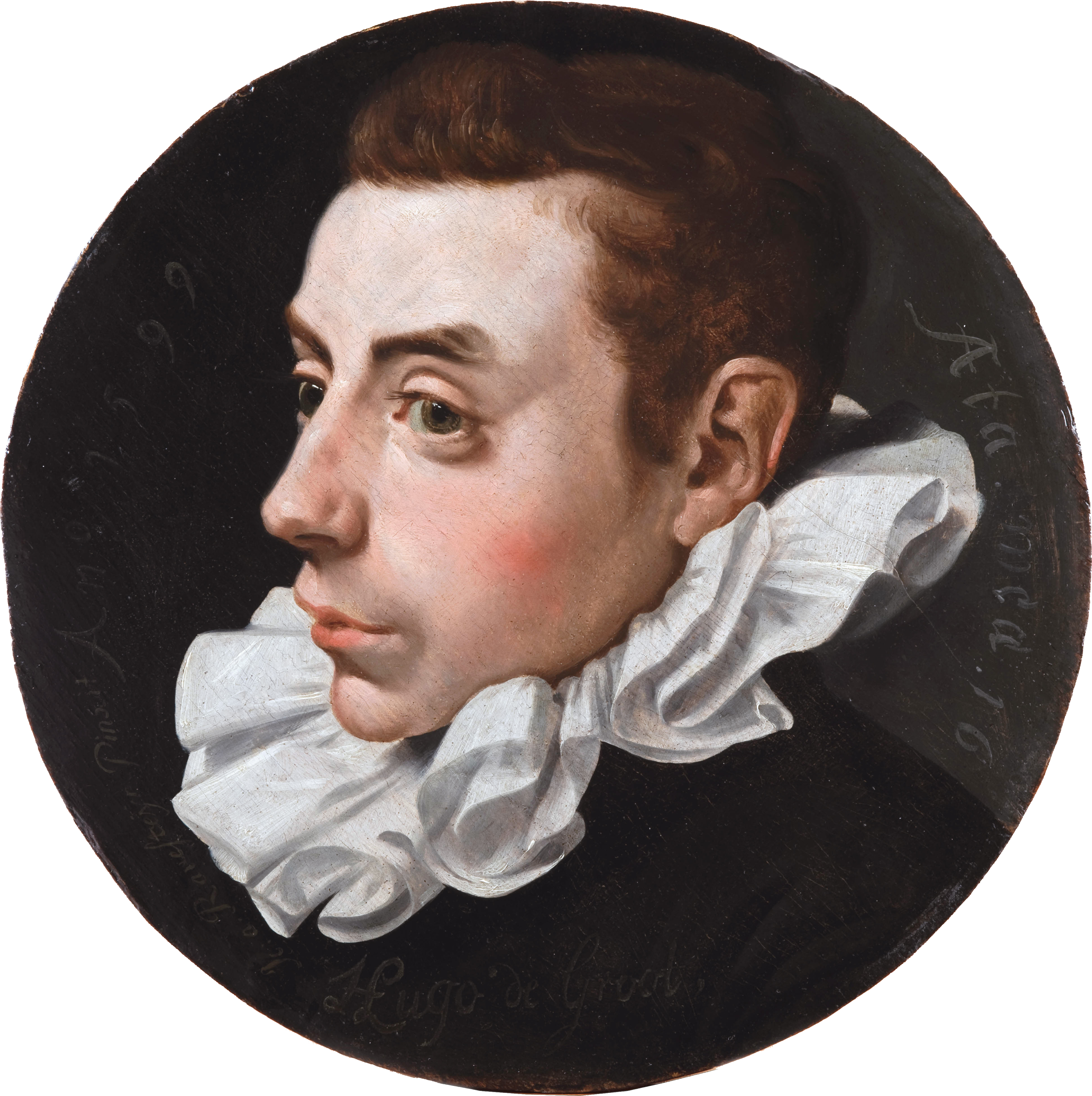
Grotius at age 16, by Jan Antonisz. van Ravesteyn, 1599

Born in Delft during the Dutch Revolt, Grotius was the first child of Jan Cornets de Groot and Alida van Overschie. His father was a man of learning, once having studied with the eminent Justus Lipsius at Leiden University, as well as of political distinction. His family was considered Delft patrician as his ancestors played an important role in local government since the 13th century.

Jan de Groot was also the translator of Archimedes and a friend of Ludolph van Ceulen. He groomed his son from an early age in a traditional humanist and Aristotelian education. A prodigious learner, Grotius entered Leiden University when he was just eleven years old. There he studied with some of the most acclaimed intellectuals in northern Europe, including Franciscus Junius, Joseph Justus Scaliger, and Rudolph Snellius. At age 16 (1599), he published his first book: a scholarly edition of the late antique author Martianus Capella's work on the seven liberal arts, Martiani Minei Felicis Capellæ Carthaginiensis viri proconsularis Satyricon. It remained a reference for several centuries.

In 1598, at the age of 15, he accompanied Johan van Oldenbarnevelt on a diplomatic mission to Paris. On this occasion, the King Henri IV of France would have presented Grotius to his court as "the miracle of Holland". During his stay in France, he passed or bought a law degree from the University of Orleans. In Holland, Grotius earned an appointment as advocate to The Hague in 1599 and then as official historiographer for the States of Holland in 1601. It was on this date that the States of Holland requested from Grotius an account of the United Provinces' revolt against Spain; Grotius is indeed contemporary with the Eighty Years' War between Spain and the Netherlands. The resulting work, entitled Annales et Historiae de rebus Belgicis, describing the period from 1559 to 1609, was written in the style of the Roman historian Tacitus and was first finished in 1612. The States, however, did not publish it, possibly because of the way the work resonated with the politico-religious tensions within the Dutch Republic (see below).

Throughout his life Grotius wrote a variety of philological, theological and politico-theological works. In 1608, he married Maria van Reigersberch; they had three daughters and four sons.

== Jurist career ==
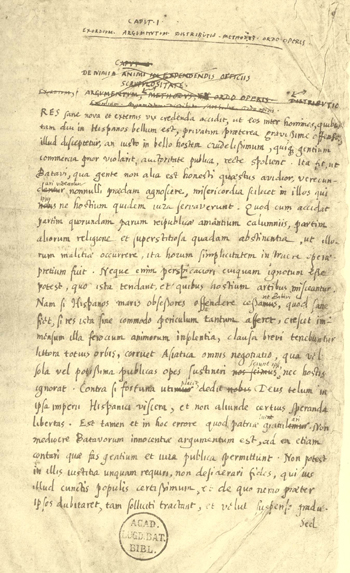
Page written in Grotius' hand from the manuscript of De Indis (circa 1604/05)

The Dutch Republic was at war with Spain. Although Portugal and Spain were united under the same monarch, Portugal was not yet at war with the Dutch. In 1603, Grotius's cousin, Captain Jacob van Heemskerk, captured the Portuguese merchant carrack Santa Catarina off present-day Singapore. Heemskerk had sailed for the United Amsterdam Company, one of the companies whose activities were taken over by the Dutch East India Company (VOC) in 1602. Although he had not been authorized by the company or the government to initiate the use of force, many shareholders were eager to accept the valuable cargo that he brought back.

The legality of keeping the prize was disputed. Some shareholders objected that they had invested in a commercial enterprise whose ships were intended for peaceful trade, not for offensive warfare or the seizure of Portuguese and Spanish vessels. The Portuguese, meanwhile, demanded the return of their cargo. Representatives of the Company called upon Grotius to draft a polemical defence of Heemskerk's actions.

The result of Grotius's efforts in 1604–05 was a long treatise, provisionally entitled De Indis (On the Indies) and later known as De Jure Praedae (On the Law of Spoils). Grotius sought to ground his defence of the seizure in principles of natural justice, extending his argument beyond the case at hand to consider the grounds for the lawfulness of war more generally. The treatise was not published in full during Grotius's lifetime.

A chapter of De Jure Praedae was published separately in 1609 as The Free Sea (Mare Liberum). In it, Grotius argued that the sea could not be appropriated as territory and that it should remain open to navigation and trade. His argument provided a justification for Dutch challenges to Portuguese claims of exclusive navigation and trade in Asian waters.

Grotius's argument became influential in later debates over freedom of the seas, but the principle had earlier precedents. The 16th-century Spanish theologian Francisco de Vitoria had defended rights of travel and communication under the principles of jus gentium. Grotius's position was later contested by the English jurist John Selden, whose Mare clausum (The Closed Sea) defended claims of sovereignty over maritime areas. Freedom of the seas subsequently became an important principle of international law and remains applicable to much of the high seas.

== Arminian controversy, arrest and exile ==
Aided by his continued association with Van Oldenbarnevelt, Grotius made considerable advances in his political career, being retained as Oldenbarnevelt's resident advisor in 1605, Advocate General of the Fisc of Holland, Zeeland and Friesland in 1607, and then as Pensionary of Rotterdam (the equivalent of a mayoral office) in 1613. Also in 1613, following the capture of two Dutch ships by the British, he was sent on a mission to London, a mission tailored to a man who wrote Mare liberum [The Free Seas] in 1609. However, it was opposed by the English by reason of force, and he didn't obtain the return of the boats.

In these years, a great theological controversy broke out between the chair of theology at Leiden Jacobus Arminius and his followers (who are called Arminians or Remonstrants) and the strongly Calvinist theologian, Franciscus Gomarus, whose supporters are termed Gomarists or Counter-Remonstrants.

Leiden University "was under the authority of the States of Holland – they were responsible, among other things, for the policy concerning appointments at this institution, which was governed in their name by a board of Curators – and, in the final instance, the States were responsible for dealing with any cases of heterodoxy among the professors". The domestic dissension resulting over Arminius' professorship was overshadowed by the continuing war with Spain, and the professor died in 1609 on the eve of the Twelve Years' Truce. The new peace would move the people's focus to the controversy and Arminius' followers. Grotius played a decisive part in this politico-religious conflict between the Remonstrants, supporters of religious tolerance, and the orthodox Calvinists or Counter-Remonstrants.

=== Controversy within Dutch Protestantism ===
The controversy expanded when the Remonstrant theologian Conrad Vorstius was appointed to replace Jacobus Arminius as the theology chair at Leiden. Vorstius was soon seen by Counter-Remonstrants as moving beyond the teachings of Arminius into Socinianism, and he was accused of teaching irreligion. Leading the call for Vorstius' removal was theology professor Sibrandus Lubbertus. On the other side, Johannes Wtenbogaert (a Remonstrant leader) and Johan van Oldenbarnevelt, Grand Pensionary of Holland, had strongly promoted the appointment of Vorstius and began to defend their actions. Gomarus resigned his professorship at Leyden, in protest that Vorstius was not removed. The Counter-Remonstrants were also supported in their opposition by King James I of England, who thundered loudly against the Leyden nomination and gaudily depicted Vorstius as a horrid heretic. He ordered his books to be publicly burnt in London, Cambridge, and Oxford, and he exerted continual pressure through his ambassador in the Hague, Ralph Winwood, to get the appointment cancelled. James began to shift his confidence from Oldenbarnevelt towards Maurice.

Grotius joined the controversy by defending the civil authorities' power to appoint (independently of the wishes of religious authorities) whomever they wished to a university's faculty. He did this by writing Ordinum Pietas, "a pamphlet ... directed against an opponent, the Calvinist Franeker professor Lubbertus; it was ordered by Grotius' masters the States of Holland, and thus written for the occasion – though Grotius may already have had plans for such a book".

The work is twenty-seven pages long, is "polemical and acrimonious", and only two-thirds of it speaks directly about ecclesiastical politics (mainly of synods and offices). The work met with a violent reaction from the Counter-Remonstrants, and "It might be said that all Grotius' next works until his arrest in 1618 form a vain attempt to repair the damage done by this book." Grotius would later write De Satisfactione aiming "at proving that the Arminians are far from being Socinians".

=== Edict of toleration ===
Led by Oldenbarnevelt, the States of Holland took an official position of religious toleration towards Remonstrants and Counter-Remonstrants. Grotius (who acted during the controversy first as Attorney General of Holland and later as a member of the Committee of Counsellors) was eventually asked to draft an edict to express the policy of toleration. This edict, Decretum pro pace ecclesiarum was completed in late 1613 or early 1614. The edict put into practice a view that Grotius had been developing in his writings on church and state (see Erastianism): that only the basic tenets necessary for undergirding civil order (e.g., the existence of God and His providence) ought to be enforced while differences on obscure theological doctrines should be left to private conscience. (Note: See his manuscript for Meletius (1611) and the more systematic De imperio summarum potestatum circa sacra (finished 1617, published 1647))

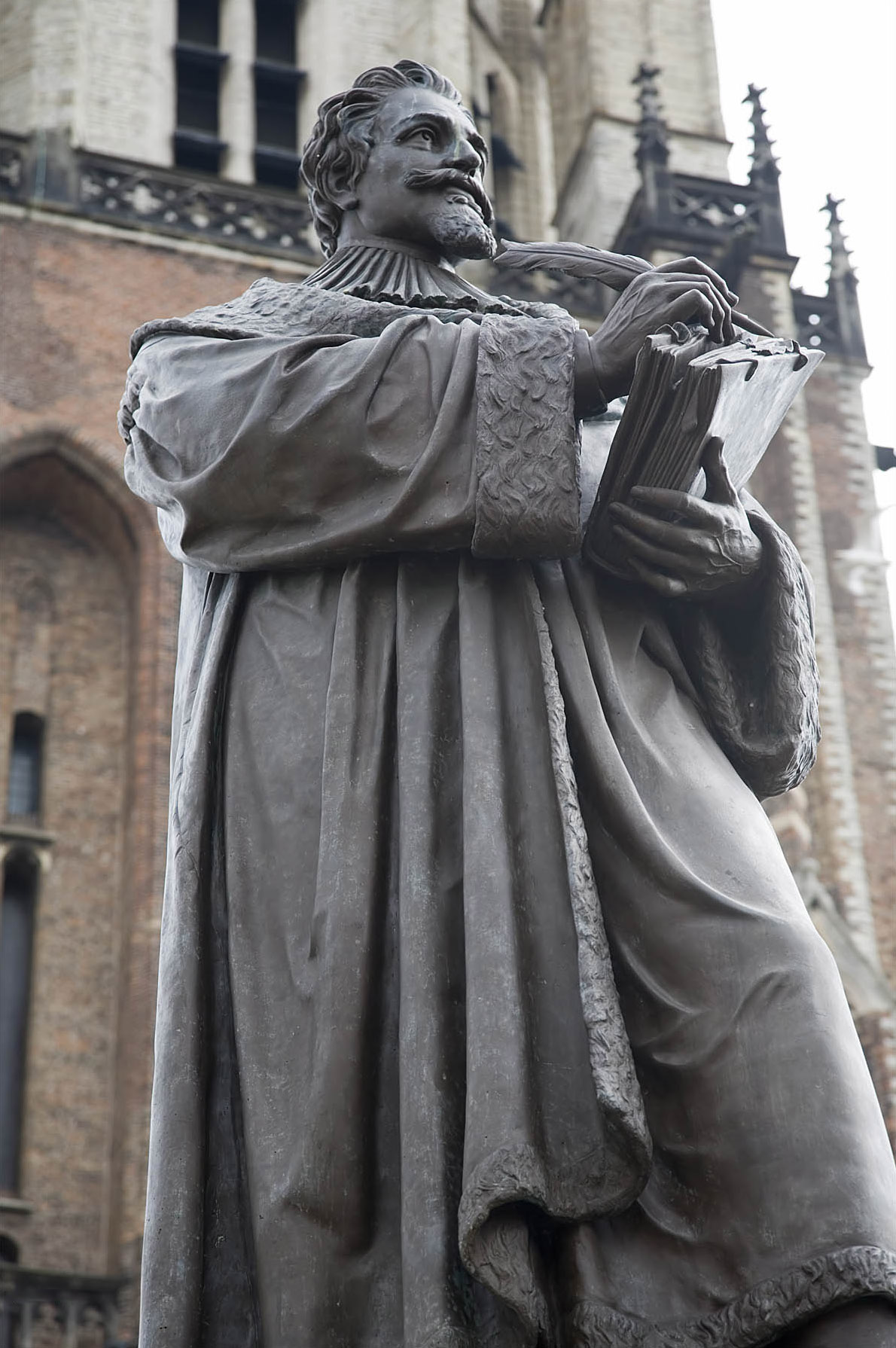
Statue of Grotius in Delft, the Netherlands

The edict "imposing moderation and toleration on the ministry" was backed up by Grotius with "thirty-one pages of quotations, mainly dealing with the Five Remonstrant Articles". In response to Grotius' Ordinum Pietas, Professor Lubbertus published Responsio Ad Pietatem Hugonis Grotii in 1614. Later that year, Grotius anonymously published Bona Fides Sibrandi Lubberti in response to Lubbertus.

Jacobus Trigland joined Lubberdus in expressing the view that tolerance in matters of doctrine was inadmissible, and in his 1615 works Den Recht-gematigden Christen: Ofte vande waere Moderatie and Advys Over een Concept van moderatie Trigland denounced Grotius' stance.

In late 1615, when Middelburg professor Antonius Walaeus published Het Ampt der Kerckendienaren (a response to Johannes Wtenbogaert's 1610 Tractaet van 't Ampt ende authoriteit eener hoogher Christelijcke overheid in kerckelijkcke zaken) he sent Grotius a copy out of friendship. This was a work "on the relationship between ecclesiastical and secular government" from the moderate counter-remonstrant viewpoint. In early 1616, Grotius also received the 36-page letter championing a remonstrant view Dissertatio epistolica de Iure magistratus in rebus ecclesiasticis from his friend Gerardus Vossius.

The letter was "a general introduction on (in)tolerance, mainly on the subject of predestination and the sacrament ... [and] an extensive, detailed and generally unfavourable review of Walaeus' Ampt, stuffed with references to ancient and modern authorities". When Grotius wrote asking for some notes "he received a treasure-house of ecclesiastical history. ... offering ammunition to Grotius, who gratefully accepted it". Around this time (April 1616) Grotius went to Amsterdam as part of his official duties, trying to persuade the civil authorities there to join Holland's majority view about church politics.

In early 1617, Grotius debated the question of giving counter-remonstrants the chance to preach in the Kloosterkerk in The Hague, which had been closed. During this time, lawsuits were brought against the States of Holland by counter-remonstrant ministers, and riots over the controversy broke out in Amsterdam.

=== Arrest and exile ===
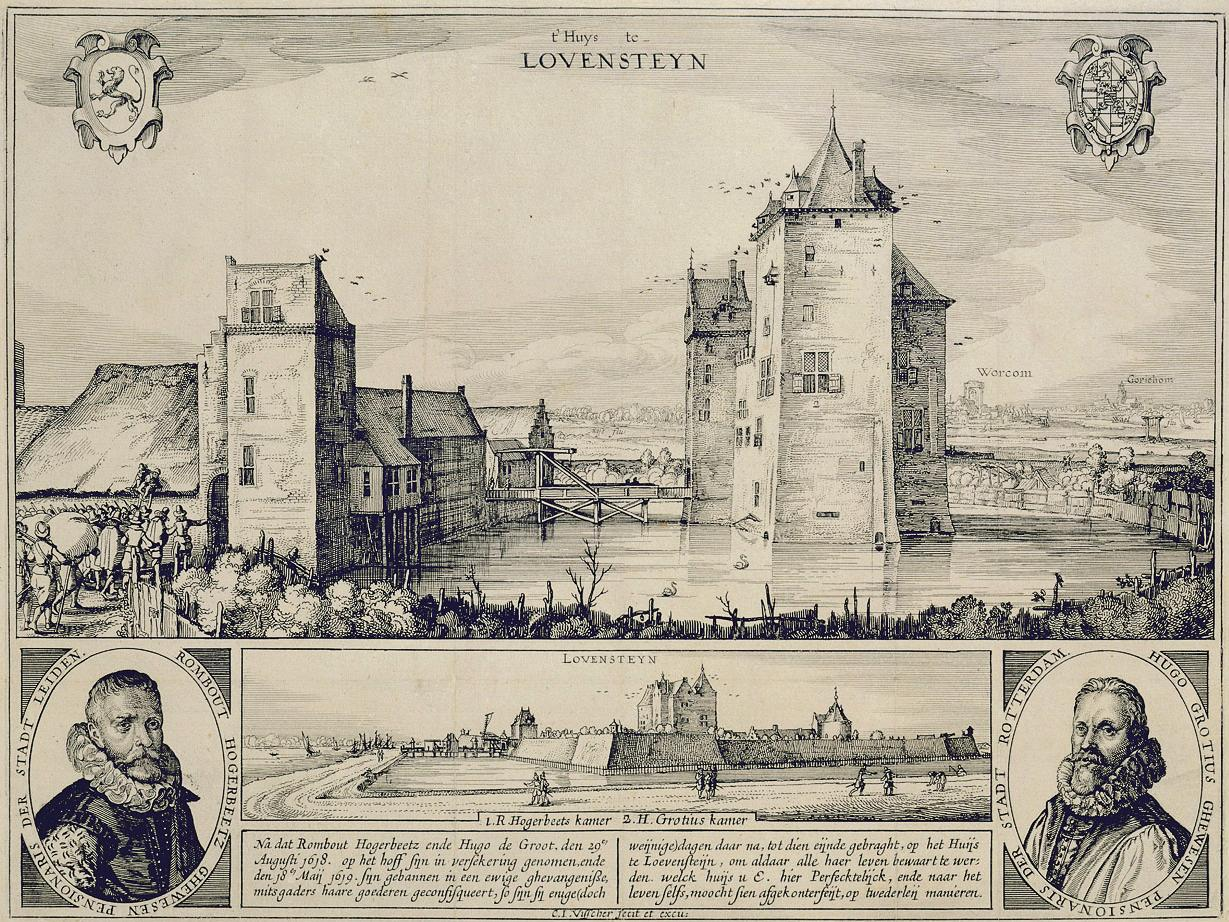
Loevestein Castle at the time of Grotius' imprisonment in 1618–21

As the conflict between civil and religious authorities escalated, in order to maintain civil order, Oldenbarnevelt eventually proposed that local authorities be given the power to raise troops (the Sharp Resolution of August 4, 1617). Such a measure undermined the unity of the Republic's military force, the very same reason Spain had managed to retake so much lost territory in the 1580s, something the Captain-General of the Republic, Maurice of Nassau, Prince of Orange could not allow with the treaty nearing its end. Maurice seized the opportunity to solidify the preeminence of the Gomarists, whom he had supported, and to eliminate the nuisance he perceived in Oldenbarnevelt (the latter had previously brokered the Twelve Years' Truce with Spain in 1609 against Maurice's wishes). During this time, Grotius made another attempt to address ecclesiastical politics by completing De Imperio Summarum Potestatum circa Sacra, on "the relations between the religious and secular authorities ... Grotius had even cherished hopes that publication of this book would turn the tide and bring back peace to church and state".

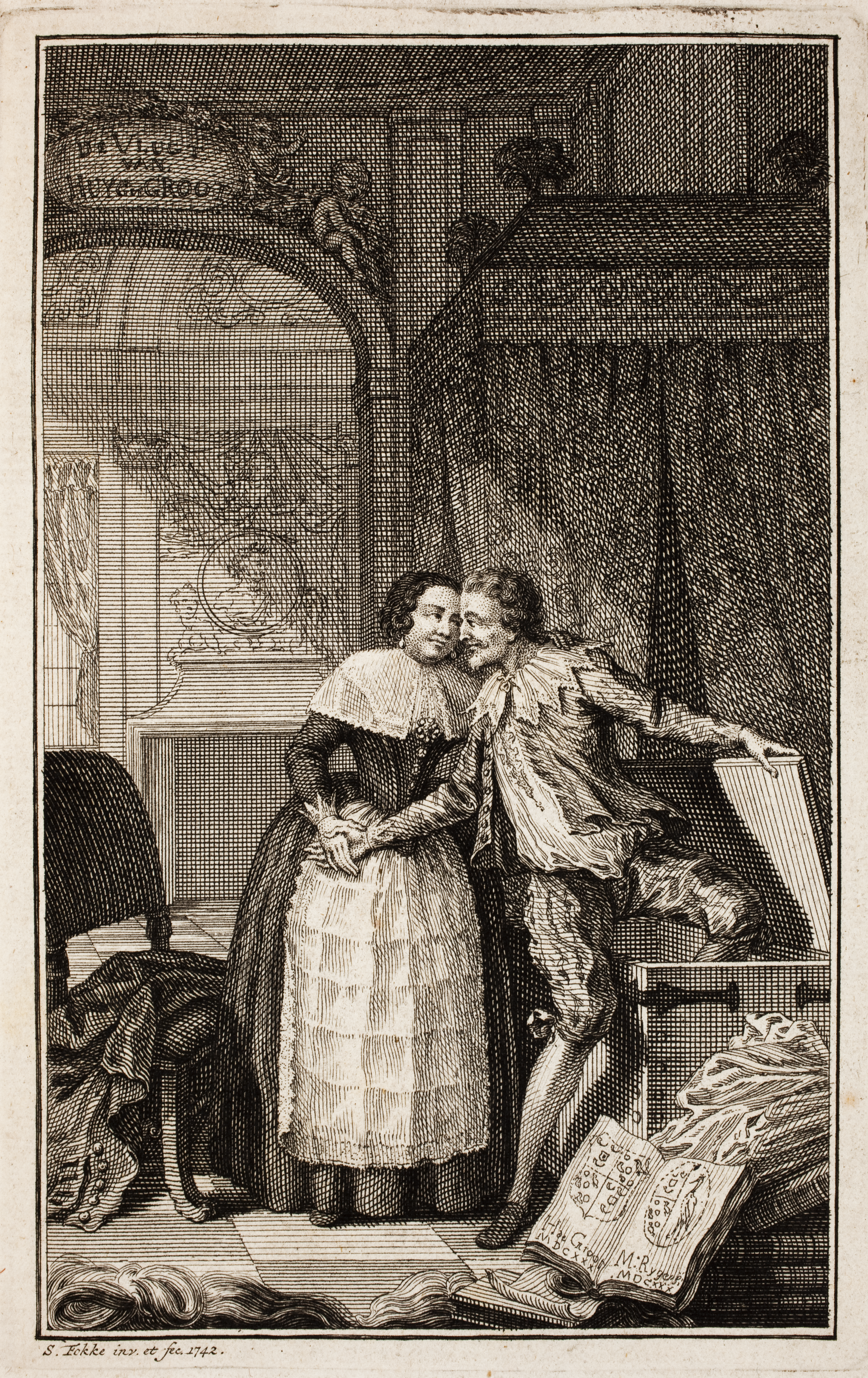
Grotius' escape from Loevestein Castle in 1621

The conflict between Maurice and the States of Holland, led by Oldenbarnevelt and Grotius, about the Sharp Resolution and Holland's refusal to allow a National Synod, came to a head in July 1619 when a majority in the States General authorized Maurice to disband the auxiliary troops in Utrecht. Grotius went on a mission to the States of Utrecht to stiffen their resistance against this move, but Maurice prevailed. The States General then authorized him to arrest Oldenbarnevelt, Grotius and Rombout Hogerbeets on 29 August 1618. They were tried by a court of delegated judges from the States General. Van Oldenbarnevelt was sentenced to death and was beheaded in 1619. Grotius was sentenced to life imprisonment and transferred to Loevestein Castle.

From his imprisonment in Loevestein, Grotius made a written justification of his position "as to my views on the power of the Christian [civil] authorities in ecclesiastical matters, I refer to my ... booklet De Pietate Ordinum Hollandiae and especially to an unpublished book De Imperio summarum potestatum circa sacra, where I have treated the matter in more detail ... I may summarize my feelings thus: that the [civil] authorities should scrutinize God's Word so thoroughly as to be certain to impose nothing which is against it; if they act in this way, they shall in good conscience have control of the public churches and public worship – but without persecuting those who err from the right way." Because this stripped Church officials of any power some of their members (such as Johannes Althusius in a letter to Lubbertus) declared Grotius' ideas diabolical.

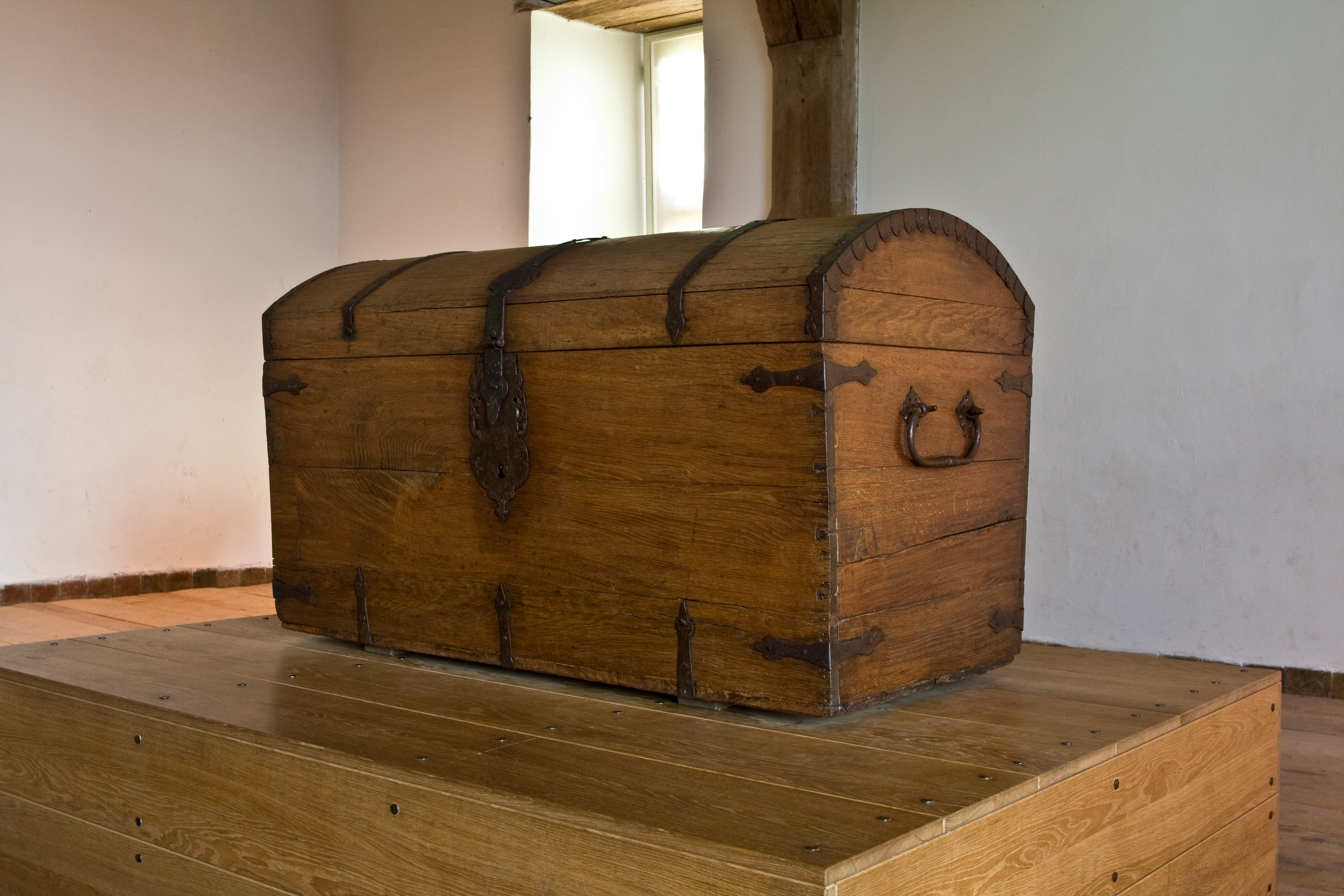
A book chest exhibited at Loevestein, presumed to be that in which Grotius escaped in 1621

In 1621, with the help of his wife and his maidservant, Elsje van Houwening, Grotius managed to escape the castle in a book chest and fled to Paris. In the Netherlands today, he is mainly famous for this daring escape. Both the Rijksmuseum in Amsterdam and the museum Het Prinsenhof in Delft claim to have the original book chest in their collection.

== Life in Paris ==
Grotius then fled to Paris, where the authorities granted him an annual royal pension. Grotius lived in France almost continuously from 1621 to 1644. His stay coincides with the period (1624-1642) during which the Cardinal Richelieu led France under the authority of Louis XIII. In France in 1625 Grotius published his most famous book, De jure belli ac pacis [On the Law of War and Peace] dedicated to Louis XIII.

While in Paris, Grotius set about rendering into Latin prose a work which he had originally written as Dutch verse in prison, providing rudimentary yet systematic arguments for the truth of Christianity. The Dutch poem, Bewijs van den waren Godsdienst, was published in 1622, the Latin treatise in 1627, under the title De veritate religionis Christianae.

In 1631, he tried to return to Holland, but the authorities remained hostile to him. He moved to Hamburg in 1632. But as early as 1634, the Swedes (a European superpower) sent him to Paris as ambassador. He remained in this position for ten years, where he had the mission to negotiate for Sweden at the end of the Thirty Years' War. During this period, he had been interested in the unity of Christians and published many texts that would posthumously (1679) be published under the title of Opera Omnia Theologica.

=== Governmental theory of atonement ===
Grotius also developed a particular view of the atonement of Christ known as the "Governmental theory of atonement". He theorized that Jesus' sacrificial death occurred in order for the Father to forgive while still maintaining his just rule over the universe. This idea, further developed by theologians such as John Miley, became one of the prominent views of the atonement in Methodist Arminianism.

== De Jure Belli ac Pacis ==
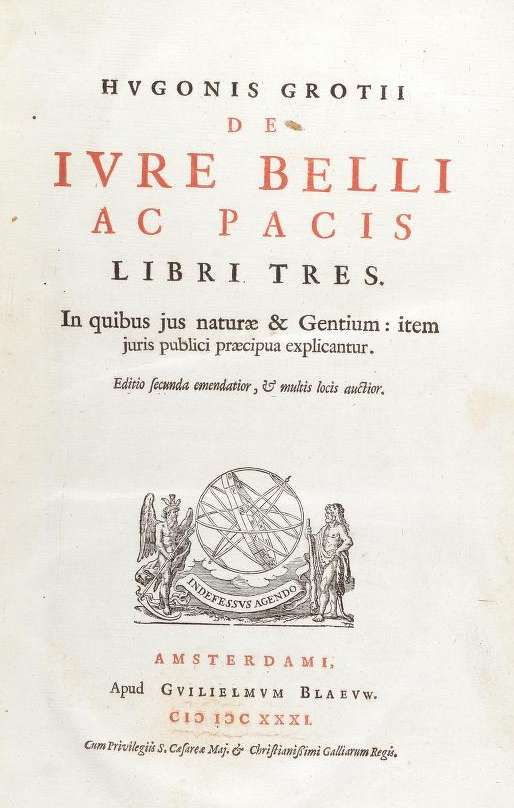
Title page from the second edition (Amsterdam 1631) of De jure belli ac pacis

Living in the times of the Eighty Years' War between Spain and the Netherlands and the Thirty Years' War between Catholic and Protestant European nations (Catholic France being in the otherwise Protestant camp), it is not surprising that Grotius was deeply concerned with matters of conflicts between nations and religions. His most lasting work, begun in prison and published during his exile in Paris, was a monumental effort to restrain such conflicts on the basis of a broad moral consensus. Grotius wrote:

Fully convinced ... that there is a common law among nations, which is valid alike for war and in war, I have had many and weighty reasons for undertaking to write upon the subject. Throughout the Christian world, I observed a lack of restraint in relation to war, such as even barbarous races should be ashamed of; I observed that men rush to arms for slight causes or no cause at all and that when arms have once been taken up, there is no longer any respect for the law, divine or human; it is as if, in accordance with a general decree, frenzy had openly been let loose for the committing of all crimes.

De jure belli ac pacis libri tres (On the Law of War and Peace: Three books) was first published in 1625, dedicated to Grotius' current patron, Louis XIII. The treatise advances a system of principles of natural law, which are held to be binding on all people and nations regardless of local custom. The work is divided into three books:

- Book I advances his conception of war and of natural justice, arguing that there are some circumstances in which war is justifiable.
- Book II identifies three 'just causes' for war: self-defence, reparation of injury, and punishment; Grotius considers a wide variety of circumstances under which these rights of war attach and when they do not.
- Book III takes up the question of what rules govern the conduct of war once it has begun; influentially, Grotius argued that all parties to war are bound by such rules, whether their cause is just or not.
- Further information: Temperamenta belli

== Natural law ==
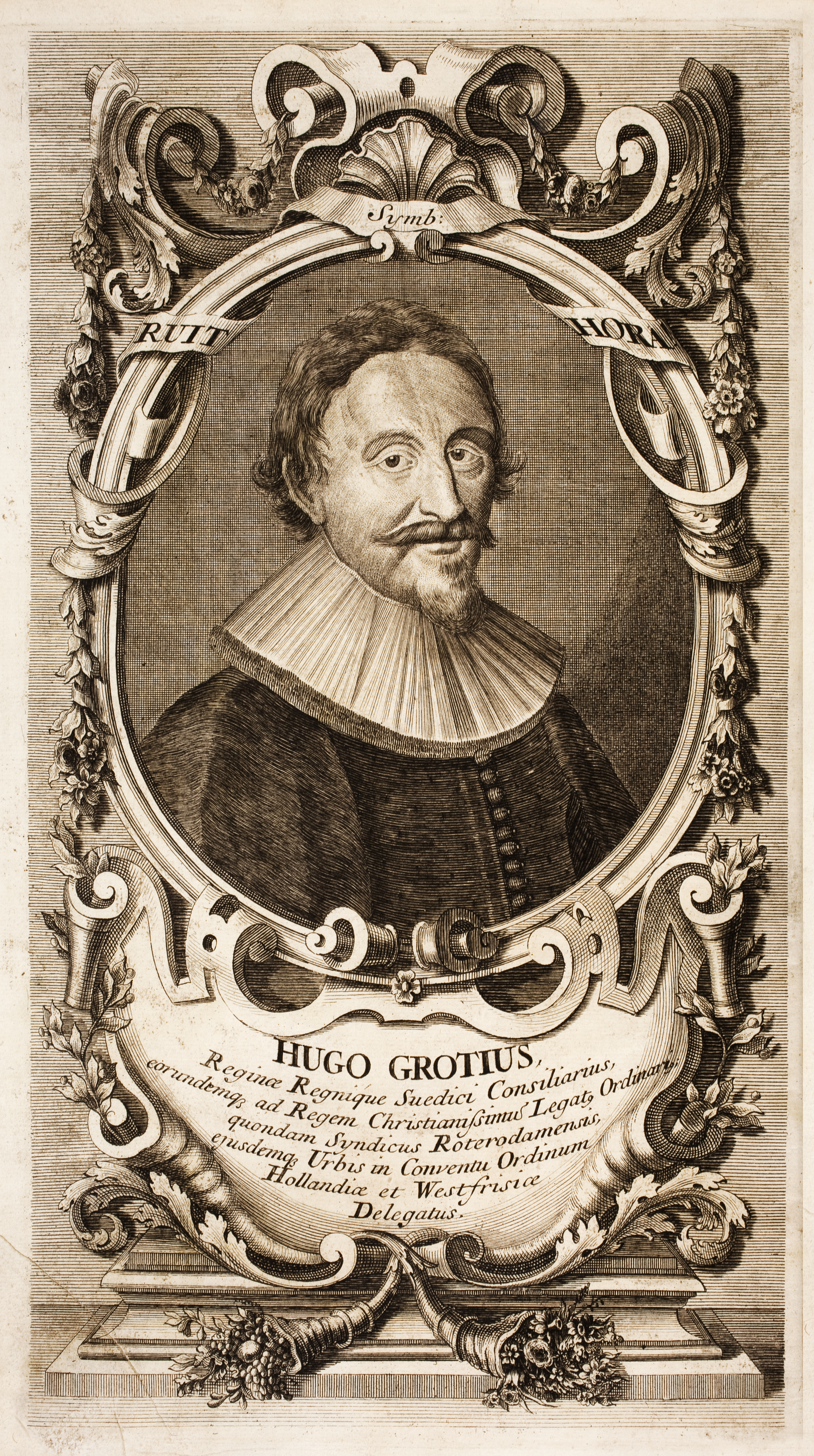
Engraved portrait of Grotius

Grotius' concept of natural law had a strong impact on the philosophical and theological debates and political developments of the 17th and 18th centuries. Among those he influenced were Samuel Pufendorf and John Locke, and by way of these philosophers, his thinking became part of the cultural background of the Glorious Revolution in England and the American Revolution. In Grotius' understanding, nature was not an entity in itself but God's creation. Therefore, his concept of natural law had a theological foundation. The Old Testament contained moral precepts (e.g. the Decalogue), which Christ confirmed and therefore were still valid. They were useful in interpreting the content of natural law. Both Biblical revelation and natural law originated in God and could, therefore, not contradict each other.

== Later years ==
Many exiled Remonstrants began to return to the Netherlands after the death of Prince Maurice in 1625, when toleration was granted to them. In 1630, they were allowed complete freedom to build and run churches and schools and to live anywhere in Holland. The Remonstrants, guided by Johannes Wtenbogaert, set up a presbyterial organization. They established a theological seminary at Amsterdam where Grotius came to teach alongside Episcopius, van Limborch, de Courcelles, and Leclerc.

In 1634, Grotius was given the opportunity to serve as Sweden's ambassador to France. Axel Oxenstierna, regent of the successor of the recently deceased Swedish king, Gustavus Adolphus, was keen to have Grotius in his employ. Grotius accepted the offer and took up diplomatic residence in Paris, which remained his home until he was released from his post in 1645.

In 1644, the queen Christine of Sweden, who had become an adult, began to perform her duties and brought him back to Stockholm. During the winter of 1644–1645, he went to Sweden in difficult conditions, which he decided to leave in the summer of 1645.

While departing from his last visit to Sweden, Grotius was shipwrecked on the voyage. He washed up on the shore of Rostock, ill and weather-beaten, and on 28 August 1645, he died; his body at last returned to the country of his youth, being laid to rest in the Nieuwe Kerk in Delft.

== Personal life ==
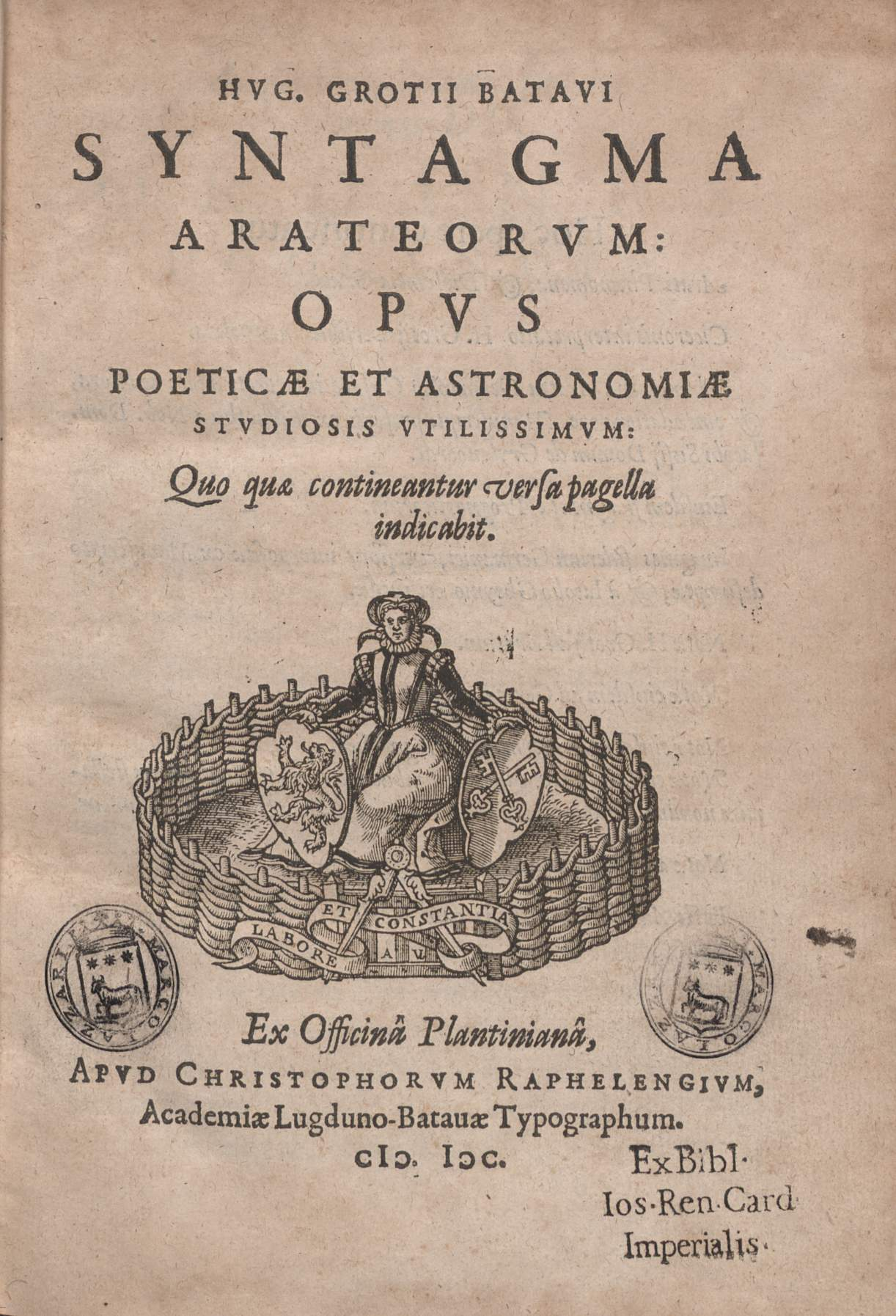
Syntagma Arateorum

Grotius' personal motto was Ruit hora ("Time is running away"); his last words were purportedly, "By understanding many things, I have accomplished nothing" (Door veel te begrijpen, heb ik niets bereikt). Significant friends and acquaintances of his included the theologian Franciscus Junius, the poet Daniel Heinsius, the philologist Gerhard Johann Vossius, the historian Johannes Meursius, the engineer Simon Stevin, the historian Jacques Auguste de Thou, the Orientalist and Arabic scholar Erpinius, and the French ambassador in the Dutch Republic, Benjamin Aubery du Maurier, who allowed him to use the French diplomatic mail in the first years of his exile. He was also friends with the Brabantian Jesuit Andreas Schottus.

Grotius was the father of regent and diplomat Pieter de Groot.

== Influence of Grotius ==
Grotius designed his theory to apply not only to states but also to rulers and subjects of law in general. Grotius's masterpiece De Jure Belli ac Pacis thus proved useful in the later development of theories of both private and criminal law.

=== From his time to the end of the 17th century ===
The king of Sweden, Gustavus Adolphus, was said to have always carried a copy of De jure belli ac pacis in his saddle when leading his troops. In contrast, King James VI and I of Great Britain reacted very negatively to Grotius' presentation of the book during a diplomatic mission.

Some philosophers, notably Protestants such as Pierre Bayle, Gottfried Wilhelm Leibniz and the main representatives of the Scottish Enlightenment Francis Hutcheson, Adam Smith, David Hume, Thomas Reid held him in high esteem. The French Enlightenment, on the other hand, was much more critical. Voltaire called it boring and Rousseau developed an alternative conception of human nature. Pufendorf, another theoretician of the natural law concept, was also sceptical.

=== Commentaries of the 19th century ===
Andrew Dickson White wrote:

Into the very midst of all this welter of evil, at a point in time to all appearance hopeless, at a point in space apparently defenseless, in a nation of which every man, woman, and child was under sentence of death from its sovereign, was born a man who wrought as no other has ever done for the redemption of civilization from the main cause of all that misery; who thought out for Europe the precepts of right reason in international law; who made them heard; who gave a noble change to the course of human affairs; whose thoughts, reasonings, suggestions, and appeals produced an environment in which came an evolution of humanity that still continues.

In contrast, Robert A. Heinlein satirized the Grotian governmental approach to theology in Methuselah's Children: "There is an old, old story about a theologian who was asked to reconcile the doctrine of Divine Mercy with the doctrine of infant damnation. 'The Almighty,' he explained, 'finds it necessary to do things in His official and public capacity which in His private and personal capacity He deplores.'"

=== Revival of interest in the 20th century ===
The influence of Grotius declined following the rise of positivism in the field of international law and the decline of natural law in philosophy. The Carnegie Foundation has nevertheless re-issued and re-translated On the Law of War and Peace after the World War I. At the end of the 20th century, his work aroused renewed interest as a controversy over the originality of his ethical work developed. For Irwing, Grotius would only repeat the contributions of Thomas Aquinas and Francisco Suárez. On the contrary, Schneewind argues that Grotius introduced the idea that "the conflict can not be eradicated and could not be dismissed, even in principle, by the most comprehensive metaphysical knowledge possible of how the world is made up".

As far as politics is concerned, Grotius is most often considered not so much as having brought new ideas but rather as one who has introduced a new way of approaching political problems. For Kingsbury and Roberts, "the most important direct contribution of ["On the Law of War and Peace"] lies in the way it systematically brings together practices and authorities on the traditional but fundamental subject of jus belli, which he organizes for the first time from a body of principles rooted in the law of nature".

The Grotiana Foundation seeks through its journal, Grotiana, to advance "the Grotian tradition".

== Bibliography (selection) ==
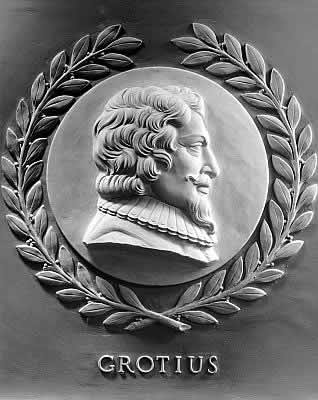
Marble bas-relief of Grotius among 23 reliefs of great historical lawgivers in the chamber of the U.S. House of Representatives in the United States Capitol

Annotationes ad Vetus Testamentum (1732)

The Peace Palace Library in The Hague holds the Grotius Collection, which has a large number of books by and about Grotius. The collection was based on a donation from Martinus Nijhoff of 55 editions of De jure belli ac pacis libri tres.

Works are listed in order of publication, with the exception of works published posthumously or after long delay (estimated composition dates are given). Where an English translation is available, the most recently published translation is listed beneath the title.

- Martiani Minei Felicis Capellæ Carthaginiensis viri proconsularis Satyricon, in quo De nuptiis Philologiæ & Mercurij libri duo, & De septem artibus liberalibus libri singulares. Omnes, & emendati, & Notis, siue Februis Hug. Grotii illustrati [The Satyricon by Martianus Minneus Felix Capella, a man from Carthage, which includes the two books of 'On the Marriage of Philology and Mercury', and the book named 'On the Seven Liberal Arts'. Everything, including corrections, annotations as well as deletions and illustrations by Hug. Grotius] - 1599
- Adamus exul (The Exile of Adam; tragedy) – The Hague, 1601
- De republica emendanda (To Improve the Dutch Republic; manuscript 1601) – pub. The Hague, 1984
- Parallelon rerumpublicarum (Comparison of Constitutions; manuscript 1601–02) – pub. Haarlem 1801–03
- De Indis (On the Indies; manuscript 1604–05) – pub. 1868 as De Jure Praedae
- Christus patiens (The Passion of Christ; tragedy) – Leiden, 1608
- Mare Liberum (The Free Seas; from chapter 12 of De Indis) – Leiden, 1609
- De antiquitate reipublicae Batavicae (On the Antiquity of the Batavian Republic) – Leiden, 1610 (An extension of François Vranck's Deduction of 1587)

The Antiquity of the Batavian Republic, ed. Jan Waszink and others (van Gorcum, 2000).

- Meletius (manuscript 1611) – pub. Leiden, 1988

Meletius, ed. G.H.M. Posthumus Meyjes (Brill, 1988).

- Annales et Historiae de rebus Belgicis (Annals and History of the Low Countries' War; manuscript 1612-13) – pub. Amsterdam, 1657

The Annals and History of the Low-Countrey-warrs, ed. Thomas Manley (London, 1665):
- Modern English translation of the Annales only in: Hugo Grotius, Annals of the War in the Low Countries, ed. with introduction by J. Waszink (Latin/English edition), Leuven UP 2023. Bibliotheca Latinitatis Novae, ISBN 978-94-6270-351-3, 978-94-6166-485-3, doi:10.11116/9789461664853.
- Modern Dutch translation of the Annales only in: Hugo de Groot, "Kroniek van de Nederlandse Oorlog. De Opstand 1559-1588", ed. Jan Waszink (Nijmegen, Vantilt 2014), with introduction, index, plates.

- Ordinum Hollandiae ac Westfrisiae pietas (The Piety of the States of Holland and Westfriesland) – Leiden, 1613

Ordinum Hollandiae ac Westfrisiae pietas, ed. Edwin Rabbie (Brill, 1995).

- De imperio summarum potestatum circa sacra (On the power of sovereigns concerning religious affairs; manuscript 1614–17) – pub. Paris, 1647

De imperio summarum potestatum circa sacra, ed. Harm-Jan van Dam (Brill, 2001).

- De satisfactione Christi adversus Faustum Socinum (On the satisfaction of Christ against [the doctrines of] Faustus Socinus) – Leiden, 1617

Defensio fidei catholicae de satisfactione Christi, ed. Edwin Rabbie (van Gorcum, 1990).
Grotius, Hugo (1889). A defence of the Catholic faith concerning the satisfaction of Christ against Faustus Socinus (PDF). Andover, MA: W. F. Draper.

- Inleydinge tot de Hollantsche rechtsgeleertheit (Introduction to Dutch Jurisprudence; written in Loevenstein) – pub. The Hague, 1631

The Jurisprudence of Holland, ed. R.W. Lee (Oxford, 1926).

- Bewijs van den waaren godsdienst (Proof of the True Religion; didactic poem) – Rotterdam, 1622
- Apologeticus (Defense of the actions which led to his arrest (This was for a long time the only source for what transpired during Grotius' trial in 1619, because the trial record was not published at the time. However, Robert Fruin edited this trial record in) – Paris, 1922
- De jure belli ac pacis (On the Law of War and Peace) – Paris, 1625 (2nd ed. Amsterdam 1631)

Hugo Grotius: On the Law of War and Peace. Student edn. Ed. Stephen C. Neff (Cambridge: Cambridge University Press, 2012)

- De veritate religionis Christianae (On the Truth of the Christian religion) – Paris, 1627

The Truth of the Christian Religion, ed. John Clarke (Edinburgh, 1819).

- Sophompaneas (Joseph; tragedy) – Amsterdam, 1635
- De origine gentium Americanarum dissertatio (Dissertation of the origin of the American peoples) – Paris 1642
- Via ad pacem ecclesiasticam (The way to religious peace) – Paris, 1642
- Annotationes in Vetus Testamentum (Commentaries on the Old Testament) – Amsterdam, 1644
- Annotationes in Novum Testamentum (Commentaries on the New Testament) – Amsterdam and Paris, 1641–50
- De fato (On Destiny) – Paris, 1648

== See also ==
- Coenraad van Beuningen
- Emer de Vattel
- English school of international relations theory
- International waters
- Grotius Lectures
- 9994 Grotius – an asteroid named after Grotius
