= Jorge E. Viñuales =

Argentine lawyer (born 1976)

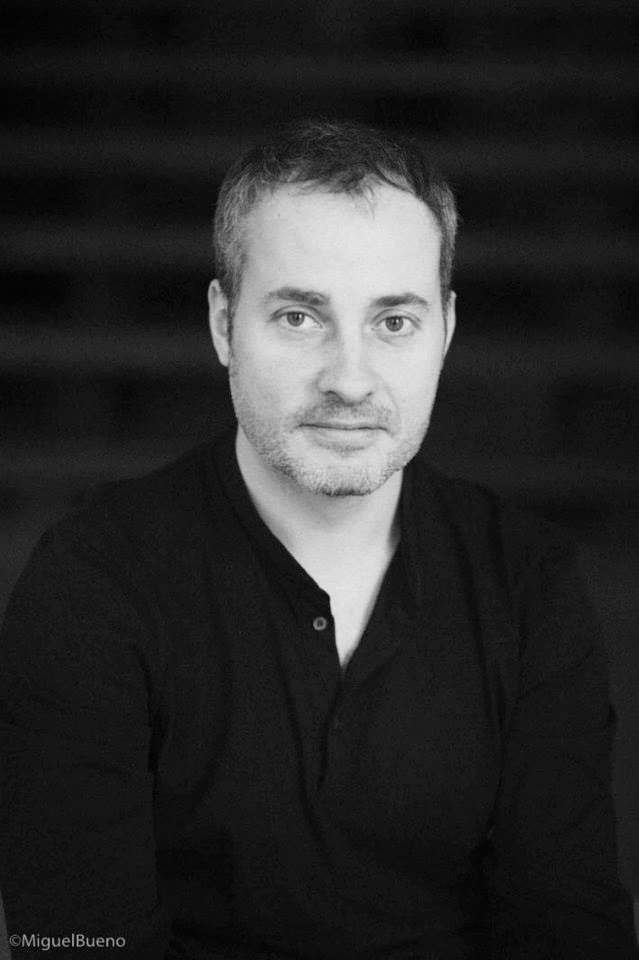
Jorge E. Viñuales

Jorge E. Viñuales (born 1976) is the Harold Samuel Professor of Law and Environmental Policy at the University of Cambridge, where he also directs the Cambridge Centre for Environment, Energy and Natural Resource Governance (C-EENRG); and a Research Professor of International Law at LUISS, in Italy. He is also the Director-General of the Latin American Society of International Law, and has been appointed as Chair of the Compliance Committee of the United Nations Economic Commission for Europe (UNECE) Protocol on Water and Health.

Viñuales is also active in private practice as counsel in an international law firm. He is a recognised authority in public international law, particularly environmental, investment and energy law. His work on the interactions between foreign investment law and environmental law has been very influential.

== Early life and education ==
Viñuales was born in Buenos Aires, Argentina, in 1976. After attending a public school, he undertook law and philosophy studies in Buenos Aires. In 1997, he moved to Switzerland where he also earned an undergraduate degrees in international relations, political science and law, and a graduate degree in international law and political science all at the Graduate Institute of International Studies. In addition, he obtained a Masters of Law at Harvard Law School, and obtained a PhD in Sciences Po Paris.

== Professional career ==
Viñuales practised law both as a private practitioner in Argentina and Switzerland, and in the non-profit sector for a number of non-governmental organisations, including Amnesty International. In 2013, at the age of 37, he became the inaugural holder of the Harold Samuel Chair of Law and Environmental Policy at the University of Cambridge, where he also became a Fellow of Clare College and of the Lauterpacht Centre for International Law, as well as the Director of the Cambridge Centre for Environment, Energy and Natural Resource Governance (C-EENRG), which he founded. In parallel with his academic career, Viñuales has continued to practice law, particularly in the areas of public international law and international dispute settlement.

His research combines conceptual analysis with both technical and interdisciplinary components. His contribution to the elucidation of the interactions between foreign investment and environmental law has been very influential in both academic and policy circles. His current work focuses on the governance of sustainability transitions, and it combines expertise in law and policy with economic and environmental modelling.

== Publications ==
Representative publications include:

- The Rio Declaration on Environment and Development. A Commentary (Oxford University Press, 2015), editor.
- International Environmental Law (Cambridge University Press, 2015), with P.-M. Dupuy.
- Foreign Investment and the Environment in International Law (Cambridge University Press, 2012, reprint 2015).
- The Foundations of International Investment Law (Oxford University Press, 2014), co-edited with Z. Douglas and J. Pauwelyn.
- Harnessing Foreign Investment to Promote Environmental Protection (Cambridge University Press, 2013), co-edited with P.-M. Dupuy.
- Diplomatic and Judicial Means of Dispute Settlement (The Hague: Martinus Nijhoff, 2012), co-edited with M. Kohen and L. Boisson de Chazournes.
