= Ordinum Hollandiae ac Westfrisiae pietas =

Book by Hugo Grotius

Ordinum Hollandiae ac Westfrisiae pietas (The Piety of the States of Holland and Westfriesland) is a 1613 book on church polity by Hugo Grotius. It was the first publication of Grotius, a prominent jurist and Remonstrant, concerned with the Calvinist-Arminian debate and its ramifications, a major factor in the politics of the Netherlands in the 1610s. The Ordinum pietas, as it is known for short, gave a commentary on the Five Articles of Remonstrance of 1610 that were the legacy of the theological views of Jacobus Arminius, who died in 1609.

== Background ==
In arguing for a relaxation of orthodox Calvinism, or from another perspective against the hardening of Reformed theology along the lines proposed by his colleague and opponent Franciscus Gomarus, Arminius had appealed to the secular authorities. As a tactical move this appeal had brought advantages; but in the following years the Remonstrants, as the followers of Arminianism became called, had to face great resistance both to their views and to their approach to settling a dispute within the Dutch Reformed Church that was theological by recourse to the civil powers.

Grotius held a prominent legal office, being Advocate General to the States of Holland and Zealand. In the period from the Hague Conference of 1611 between Remonstrants and their opponents the Contra-Remonstrants, the views of Grotius were not widely known. It was with the publication of the Ordinum Pietas that he came off the fence, and became identified with the Remonstrant cause. The consequences on a personal level for the author were serious: six years later he was under a death sentence, after the religious conflict became a matter of high politics.

== Composition of the work ==
Grotius visited England for two months in the spring of 1613, taken there by legal issues centred on Dutch and British trading in the East Indies. He moved in the highest circles, meeting both James I of England, and George Abbot the Archbishop of Canterbury. He began the composition of the Ordinum Pietas after his return, making use of Calvinist theological reading which he had spent time on after the Conference. Particularly useful to the debate and relevant for citation were John Calvin, Pierre Du Moulin, David Paraeus, William Perkins, Johannes Piscator, and William Whitaker.

In writing this book, Grotius was self-consciously taking a position in the affair of Conrad Vorstius. That was because it took aim at a work of Sibrandus Lubbertus from 1611, Commentarii ad nonaginta novem errores Conradi Vorstii from 1611, the year in which Vorstius, an Arminian, had been forced out of the University of Leiden. More particularly it was directed against the dedication Lubbertus had made to George Abbot, in which the States of Holland were criticised for their lenient handling of the Remonstrants, and their reluctance to call a synod. In reply to a polemic, he also used a rough, even insulting polemical tone of opponents; Grotius later felt he should have shown more restraint in the book.

== Views ==
Grotius argued for the tradition of Erasmus of seeking concord, putting down a marker for eirenicism; he also poured scorn on the idea, a frequent proposal of the time and in the event the solution taken, of a synod to decide on the theological points. These ideas he developed by citing the Church Fathers; if not by name, Grotius uses the consensus patrum as a yardstick.

He brought up the third-century example of Firmilian, a saint, who had taken a soft line with Paul of Samosata, later adjudged a heretic (monarchianism). Grotius proposed an approach based on modestia (moderation), and a religious toleration not restricted to the holding of opinions privately (a restriction which had been cited in the debate from the Theodosian Code) given the existing tolerance in the Netherlands. He wanted to move the ground of the discussion from sharp definition of issues, onto the territory of procedure, and the coexistence of orthodoxy with other beliefs.

In the second part of the work he argues from the early Protestant Reformation. Erasmus, who was indeed Dutch if a Catholic, had disagreed with Martin Luther on predestination, the most contentious issue in the debate. The Contra-Remonstrant view was an import, too. Calvin and Philipp Melanchthon had not completely agreed in their formulation of Protestant confessions; but orthodoxy could therefore allow co-existing views on predestination.

Grotius argued, in the third part, for what came to be called Erastianism, giving the state power over church matters. The leading Remonstrant theologian Johannes Wtenbogaert had already done this in his Tractaet of 1610. Grotius therefore gives arguments, for example that "human jurisprudence" and "divine jurisprudence" cannot be separated without loss. An example was close to hand in the recent history of the Flemish church, to support the disorder inherent in separate jurisdictions.

== Reception ==
There were numerous hostile responses to the Ordinum Pietas, the first being the Ad Scripti...Hugonis Grotii (1614) of Johannes Bogermann. From the Remonstrant side it was answered by Caspar Barlaeus, Johannes Arnoldi Corvinus, and Gerard Vossius. Lubbertus also replied in 1614, with his carefully considered Responsio ad Pietatem Hugonis Grotii, from a team involving also Petrus Plancius, Festus Hommius and Matthew Slade. Antonius Walaeus, a friendly Calvinist, had warned Grotius that his treatment of predestination would not be accepted by orthodox Calvinists; and so it proved, despite the reference to Johannes Anastasius Veluanus by way of pointing out the Dutch tradition of moderation on the topic.

Jacques-August de Thou received a complimentary copy; but his reaction was to warn Grotius about the dangers of political involvement.

Translations from the original Latin were into Dutch (Wtenbogaert) and into French, by Samuel Naeranus.

A reprint was published (dated 1613 also) which toned down some of the criticisms of Lubbertus, but it was too late for Grotius to regain his reputation as a potential unifier of the Dutch church.

== Related works ==
Grotius wrote extensively on related topics in the next years: these writings fall into three different classes:

- Writings in an official capacity, as an employee of the States;
- Publications on his own initiative; and
- Manuscripts that were not published at the time.

In the third category fall the Meletius, begun in 1611, and the De imperio summarum potestatum circa sacra, which was only published posthumously, in 1647. The De imperio was completed about 1614, and then Grotius worked on a work against Socinianism, to clarify his opposition to Unitarian views. He sent it to Walaeus, an increasingly sceptical sounding board, and published it in 1617 as Defensio fidei Catholicae de satisfactione Christi adversus Faustus Socinum.
