= Antonius Walaeus =

Dutch Calvinist minister, theologian, and academic

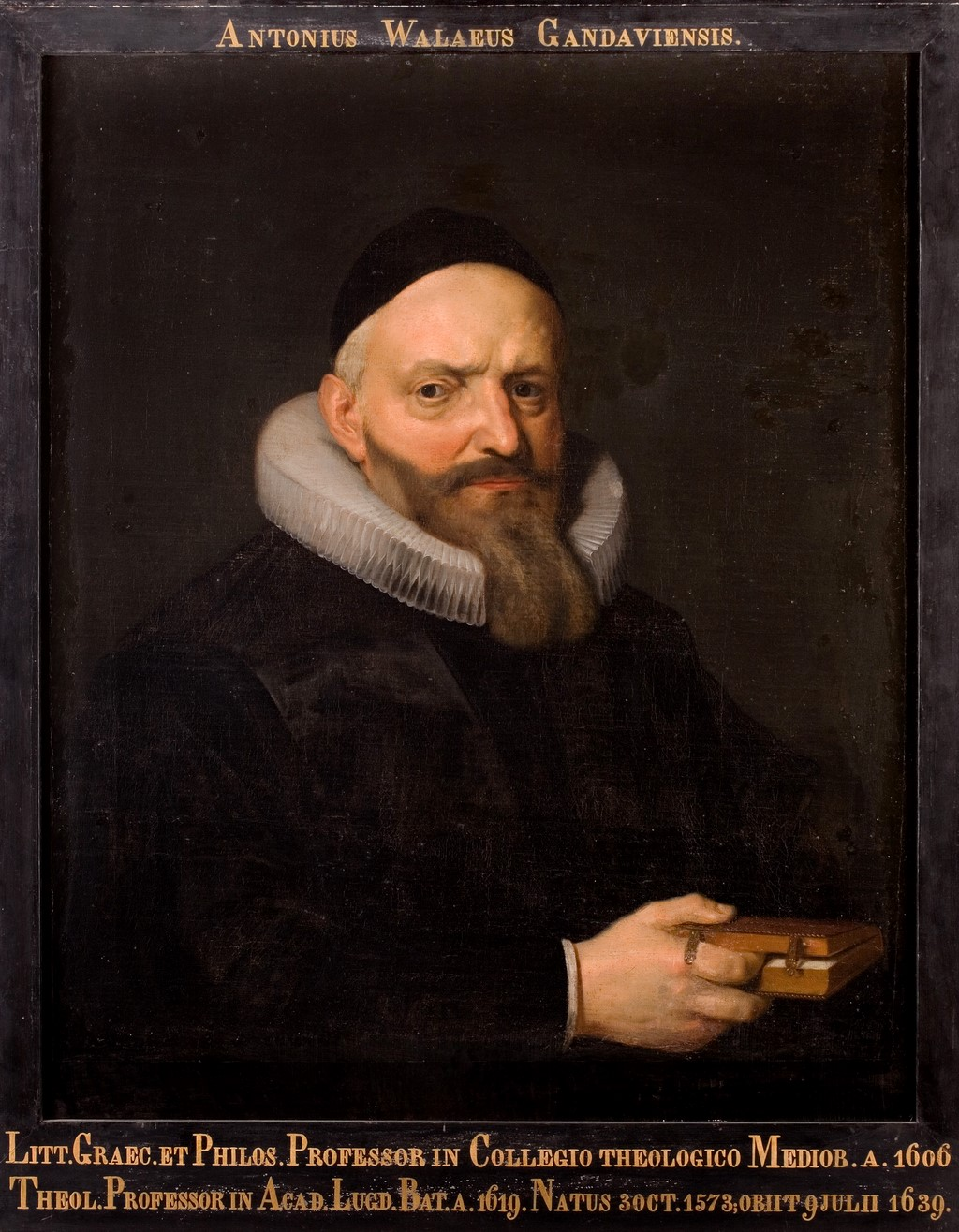
Antonius Walaeus

Antonius Walaeus (Antoine de Waele, Anton van Wale) (October 1573, Ghent – 3 July 1639, Leiden) was a Dutch Calvinist minister, theologian, and academic.

== Early life ==
He was born at Ghent, where his father Jacques de Waele had moved from Brussels, after the execution of Lamoral, Count of Egmont in 1568. Jacques de Waele being a supporter of William I, Prince of Orange, the family left for Zeeland in 1585.

Walaeus was educated at Middelburg school, where he was taught by Jacobus Gruterus and Murdisonius, and then at the University of Leiden, under Franciscus Junius, Lucas Trelcatius, and Franciscus Gomarus. He travelled to France and Geneva, staying with Charles Perrot. After a time at Basel he returned to the Netherlands in 1601, and became minister at the Dutch reformed church in Koudekerke in 1602. He then taught at Middelburg.

== Religious conflict ==
In the period of rising theological tension between Remonstrants and Contra-Remonstrants, Walaeus was on good terms with Hugo Grotius, despite the latter's Arminian views. In 1615 Walaeus published Het Ampt der Kerckendienaren, against the leading Remonstrant and ally of Grotius, Johannes Wtenbogaert, taking up the relationship of church and state. It replied to the Ampt ende Authoriteyt of Wtenbogaert, but also implicitly took aim at the Pietas Ordinum of Grotius. Its tone was quite peaceable and open to compromise; the work put Walaeus at the centre of the theological debate, but Wtenbogaert decided on a polemical reply. Gerard Vossius wrote a private letter to Grotius about Het Ampt, unsympathetic to Walaeus, which was published much later as Dissertation epistolica de iure magistratus in rebus ecclesiasticis.(1669).

In 1617 Walaeus became prominent on the Contra-Remonstrant side as a preacher at The Hague. After the Synod of Dort of 1618–9 he was appointed to the theological faculty at Leiden. The formulation of the Five Points of Calvinism in the Canons of Dort has been attributed to Walaeus, Godefridus Udemans, and Jacobus Triglandius.

In the aftermath of the Synod, Walaeus ministered to Johan van Oldenbarneveldt before his execution. Oldenbarneveldt, Grotius, and other leaders of the Remonstrants were sentenced to death; Walaeus was asked to communicate the sentence to Oldenbarneveldt, Grotius, and Rombout Hogerbeets. In the case of Grotius he felt his position was too difficult, and refused. Grotius and Hogerbeets then had their sentences commuted. In the final days of Oldenbarneveldt, Walaeus acted as intermediary with Maurice of Nassau, Prince of Orange who had brought the religious conflict to a head as a political matter.

== At Leiden ==
He was a New Testament and Apocrypha translator for the Statenvertaling, working with Festus Hommius and Jacobus Rolandus. In 1622 he was asked to establish a training college for missionaries at Leiden, for the Dutch East India Company. Among his students was Robertus Junius the missionary.

It has been stated that Walaeus was concerned to minimise the differences between the Dutch Reformed Church and the views of John Robinson, minister to an English congregation in the Netherlands. After Robinson's death (1625), Walaeus wrote, in a letter published in translation by Henry Martyn Dexter, to the effect that Robinson had looked to bridge divisions between local congregations, and wished one of his sons to train for the Dutch Reformed ministry. It has been argued that this claim (endorsed by Hommius) was made in the hope of getting funding for the education of the Robinson family, of which three sons registered at Leiden; of these, one became a minister but was not trained at Leiden.

Walaeus, with Johannes Polyander and Anthony Thysius of the Leiden faculty, gave advice as an eirenic moderate on other matters concerning the English congregations, in 1633–4. They questioned the means used to effect liturgical changes, and advised that the De conscientia of William Ames should be revised for its aggressive tone against the Church of England.

His portrait was painted by David Bailly.

== Works ==
His Compendium ethicae Aristotelicae was based on courses at Middleburg school. In defining an eclectic moral philosophy that would nevertheless be acceptable to Christians, Walaeus chose the Nicomachean Ethics of Aristotle as a basis, to be corrected, despite a view that Plato was the superior moral philosopher as Aristotle was the better physicist; he used Aristotle's classification of virtues rather than the Protestant Lambert Daneau's reliance on the Ten Commandments. Plato's purifying virtues were matched to the account in the Beatitudes; but in the end Plato was found to lack Christian theological concepts. In discussing the supreme good he defended the tenet of Stoicism that it consists of good habits; the Epicurean view might be corrected in its more abstract form of "mental joy", though not as physical pleasure. Moral philosophy included politics and economics, as well as ethics.

In his Enchiridion religionis reformae, an introductory seminary text, Walaeus gives a simplified form of the arguments of Zacharias Ursinus on natural theology; and relies little on Scripture for the existence of God. His Loci communibus sacrae theologiae et consiliis is a more advanced text, and develops a philosophical theism. Along with Franciscus Gomarus, Walaeus accepted a theory of middle knowledge of God (scientia media), more often associated with Molinism.

Synopsis purioris theologiae disputationibus quinquaginta duabus comprehensa (1625) with his colleagues Johannes Polyander, André Rivet and Anthony Thysius attempted to settle the Leiden view on controversial issues as a united front. Further, the Leiden Synopsis was intended to provide a Dutch Reformed orthodoxy, providing a manual of 880 pages covering 52 disputations, a resource for apologetics.

The posthumous Opera Omnia (1643) contains De opinione chiliastarum with views on millennarianism. Walaeus had corresponded with Joseph Mede, and his attitude to Cerinthus, Johannes Piscator and Johann Heinrich Alsted in this area was negative, instead placing the Second Coming away from terrestrial events. Johannes Cocceius followed Walaeus in his interest in prophecy.

Controversy with the Remonstrants continued, especially with Simon Episcopius and Johannes Arnoldi Corvinus.

Walaeus emphasized daily repentance in his writings.

== Family ==
The physician Johannes Walaeus (Jan de Wale) was his son.
