= Matthew Slade =

Matthew Slade ((in Latin) Mattheus Sladus) (1569–1628) was an English nonconformist minister and royal agent, in the Netherlands by 1600 and active there in the Contra-Remonstrant cause.

== Early life ==
Born at South Perrot in Dorset, he was second son of John Slade (d. 1574), rector of South Perrot, who married in 1567 Joanna, daughter of John Owsley of Misterton, Somerset. His elder brother Samuel Slade (1568–1612?) graduated B.A. at Oxford 1586, M.A. 1594, became vicar of Embleton, Northumberland, but resigned the living to travel in Europe and the east in search of manuscripts, and died in Zante before 1613.

Matthew matriculated at St Alban Hall on 29 October 1585, and graduated B.A. on 13 January 1589. He taught a school in Devon.

== In Amsterdam ==
About 1597 he went to Amsterdam, where he earned a living as a teacher and librarian. He became part of the city's intellectual life, and made a reputation as a controversialist.

=== Teacher and scholar ===
Slade met others with similar linguistic interests: Henry Ainsworth and Hugh Broughton. He also associated with the printer and Arabist Jan Theunisz, who was a Mennonite. Slade worked as assistant master in the Latin school in Koestraat from 1598, becoming rector there in 1602. As a scholar, Slade was on good terms with Isaac Casaubon, Gerard Vossius, and Joseph Justus Scaliger.

=== Church member ===
Slade became one of the first elders of the Brownist congregation in Amsterdam, with Daniel Studley and George Knyviton. This was the so-called Ancient Church, of Ainsworth, Francis Johnson and George Johnson. Slade then withdrew from the Brownist congregation, which excommunicated him; one of the points at issue was the Dutch approach to infant baptism. In 1605 he helped set up the English Reformed Church in Amsterdam, though he was not himself a member of it; Slade lobbied to have Broughton as minister there, but Broughton preferred Middelburg. John Paget took the position. Slade joined the Dutch Reformed Church, and in 1611 an attempt to have him as an elder of the English Reformed Church failed. In 1618 Slade was reconciled in Amsterdam with Francis Johnson, who had moved to Emden, and who died soon after.

=== Religious controversialist and informant ===
Slade threw himself into the Arminian controversy. He corresponded with the Contra-Remonstrant leader Sibrand Lubbertus at Franeker University from 1611 to 20 August 1620. When in 1611 Conrad Vorstius was appointed successor to Jacobus Arminius as theological professor at the University of Leiden, Slade wrote an attack on him, Cum Conrado Vorstio (1612), the second volume being published by his associate Jodocus Hondius the Younger. Vorstius was compelled by the States of Holland, at James I's instigation, to quit Leiden in 1612.

Vorstius had been dislodged from his chair at Leiden, but the debate around him was by no means over. Hugo Grotius, the prominent Remonstrant, had visited England in 1613, and Dutch Calvinist preachers wished to diminish his influence there. Johannes Regius of London prompted Slade to act; via Simon Ruytingius in London a copy of a book by Lubbertus against Vorstius reached George Abbot. Later in the year Ralph Winwood and Horace Vere paid an extended call to Slade to obtain his views. Slade was also closely involved with the preparation of the Responsio ad Pietatem Hugonis Grotii of Lubbertus which was a reply to the Ordinum Pietas of Grotius, supplying corrections, asking for a sharper attack, and involving Petrus Plancius and Festus Hommius.

As a side issue, the reputation of Erasmus was called into question by Slade, who associated him polemically with some heretical positions, while suggesting he would have enjoyed his popularity with the Remonstrant faction. Grotius defended Erasmus as a true reformer; in private to Vossius he wrote that Slade was best ignored. Grotius and Vossius were both outraged by the imputations, in the second part of Slade's attack on Vorstius, but it was Caspar Barlaeus who blasted Slade in his Bogermannus elenchomenos (1615).

In 1614 Slade was involved in further controversy with Rem Bisschop, another Remonstrant, at the house of his relation by marriage Plancius. When the debate became important to diplomacy, Slade passed intelligence to Sir Dudley Carleton, who was English ambassador at The Hague from 1616. Slade sent to Carleton a work on the Arminian controversy early in 1618. He went to Francis Johnson's funeral, and reported to Carleton on Johnson's final views on Arminianism, as presented in his book The Christian Plea. The older interpretations, by Edward Arber and Henry Morton Dexter, of Slade's testimony about Johnson have been contested.

Slade also kept in touch with John Robinson and his congregation. He acted as an intermediary with John Burges, a critic of Robinson. In September 1619 Carleton wished to track down William Brewster, the future Pilgrim Father; Slade located him as somewhere in Leiden.

=== Death ===
Slade died on 10 February 1628, and was buried in the Zuiderkerk.

== Family ==
Slade married, on 20 September 1593, Alethea (Allis), daughter of Richard Kirford, near Honiton. She died in 1608. He then married, later in the year, Suzanna de Kampenaer, who was step-daughter of Petrus Plancius. They had four children, before Suzanna died in 1614. He married twice more.

Slade's son Cornelius Slade, born at Amsterdam on 14 October 1599, was professor of Hebrew and other languages there, and became rector of the academy on 9 May 1628, perhaps following his father. He married Gertrude, daughter of Luke Ambrose, an English preacher there, and was father of Matthew Slade (1628–1689), born 9 June 1628 in England, who became a physician. Under the anagram of Theodorus ‘Aldes,’ Matthew wrote ‘Dissertatio epistolica de Generatione Animalium contra Harveium’ (Amsterdam, 1666; reprinted twice at Frankfurt in 1668), and was author of several medical treatises. Matthew died on 20 December 1689.
