= Sibrandus Lubbertus =

Dutch Calvinist theologian (c.1555–1625)

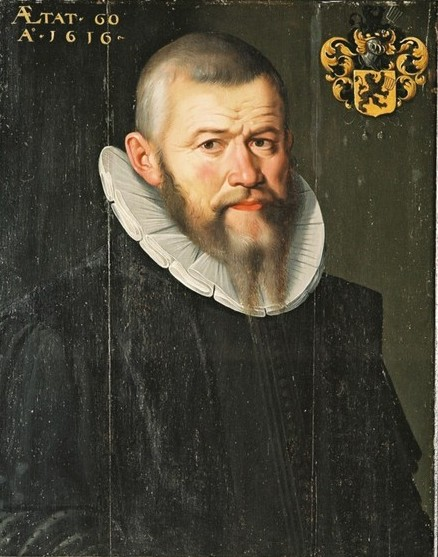
Sibrandus Lubbertus

Sibrandus Lubbertus (c.1555–1625) (also referred to as Sibrand Lubbert or Sybrandus Lubbertus) was a Dutch Calvinist theologian and was a professor of theology at the University of Franeker for forty years from the institute's foundation in 1585. He was a prominent participant in the Synod of Dort (1618–1619). His primary works were to counter Roman Catholic doctrine (especially that championed by Robert Bellarmine) and to oppose Socinianism and Arminianism.

== Life ==
Lubbertus was born in Langwarden in 1555. He studied Divinity in Wittenberg in 1574 and in Geneva in 1576, where one of his professors was Theodore Beza. He also studied in Marburg in 1578 and at Neustadt an der Weinstraße in 1580, where one of his teachers was Zacharias Ursinus. He earned his doctorate in theology on 22 June 1587 in Heidelberg under Daniel Tossanus.

Around 1592 Hadrian à Saravia, who had left the Netherlands for England, wrote in his De Gradibus complaining that the Netherlands' governmental pay of fixed stipends to ministers was far too small and "evidence that the church's officers were not shown the respect that was their due...he spoke of the 'misera conditio' of ministers in Holland. The government behaved towards them like an employer." Saravia found that his local officials held that giving ministers too much money would make them "grow in respect and authority in the eyes of the people" and make them rivals of the burgomasters and sheriffs. Theodore Beza already under attack from Leiden professor, Carolus Gallus (who questioned his "views on election, creation, the relationship between church and state and church order") saw Saravia's work as a further attack on his Church. Beza wrote to Lubbertus in 1592 expecting support. Lubbertus did not come to the aid of Calvin's successor, feeling that as Saravia was in the Anglican Church that his views would not have the power of appeal in the Netherlands that Beza feared.

In 1601 Lubbertus wrote against Robert Bellarmine in De conciliis libri quinque, Scholastice & Theologice collati cum disputationibus Roberti Bellarmini.

== Responsio ad Pietatem Hugonis Grotii ==
Lubbertus is best known for his opposition to the position of Hugo Grotius, who defended the right of the civil authority to place whomever they wished into university faculty. Lubbertus held that professor Conrad Vorstius' views were so far outside the norm of Calvinism that they may be considered irreligion. Lubbertus was the lead voice calling for Vorstius' removal.

In order to gather international backing for their position, Lubbertus and Matthew Slade (a rector of the academy at Amsterdam, a member of the eldership in the English church at Amsterdam, and the son-in-law of Amsterdam minister Petrus Plancius) began a correspondence with English divines including George Abott, the Archbishop of Canterbury. Their outreach for support succeeded to the point that King James I of England became obsessed with the controversy.

Ecclesiologically King James liked the Remonstrant Johannes Wtenbogaert's Tractaet van't ampt ende authoriteyt which held that the state held complete authority over the Church (a position James held in his controversy over the Oath of Allegiance with the Jesuits). It was due to the Oath controversy that King James had produced A Premonition to alle Most Mighty Monarchs, Kings, Free Princes, and States of Christendom in 1609 as "a warning against papal pretensions to worldly power". James also began a pamphlet campaign against the papacy, whom Bellarmine and Francisco Suárez defended. The Jesuit Martinus Becanus, native to the Netherlands, was also engaged in this pamphlet campaign.

Becanus's Refutatio Apologiae linked King James with Vorstius, while declaring James' argument as resting on the heresies of Arianism or Macedonianism when James claimed that the Holy Spirit, and not Peter and his successors is the vicar of Christ. In Becanus's Examen Plagae Regiae, he implied James' and Vorstius' opinions were the same and that they went beyond heresy into atheism. This infuriated James and made him desire to show his disdain to all things smacking of heterodoxy.

Joining Lubbertus's cause against Vorstius, King James produced his own volume on the matter in 1612 entitled His Maiesties Declaration concerning His Proceedings with the States general of the United Provinces of the Low Countreys, In the cause of D. Conradus Vorstius.

Lubbertus rose to the attention of the Dutch civil authorities who had sided with the Remonstrants with his publishing of a 900-page book Commentarii ad nonaginta errores Conradi Vorstii which opened with a dedicatory letter to George Abbot, the Archbishop of Canterbury. In the dedication he attacked the States of Holland and other authorities for appointing Vorstius to professor of Divinity at Leiden University and accused them of introducing Socianianism into the Dutch Church.

In response to Lubbertus' work against Vorstius, Hugo Grotius (a representative for Rotterdam and the acting Judge Advocate of Holland) wrote Ordinum Pietas in 1613. This caustic polemic not only attacked Lubbertus' views but called him out in print (such as listing a number of quotations of Church Fathers and then saying "What are you going to reply to this mass of examples - Sibrandus?").

In Ordinum Pietas Grotius declared that Lubbertus' position against Vorstius was merely a smokescreen for him to discredit the States of Holland. Grotius attacked Lubbertus and the Counter-Remonstrants for resisting Vorstius' appointment as following anti-Melanchthonianism and abandoning hopes of unity. He declared that Lubbertus was upset with the States because of their toleration of the Remonstrants (and their Erastianistic opinions), thereby presenting all of Lubbertus' actions against Vorstius as motivated merely from frustration over the toleration shown to the Remonstrants by the States of Holland.

Noting how Grotius had pulled outside elements into the debate over Vorstius, Festus Hommius wrote to Lubbertus on 8 November 1613, warning him that Grotius might have a hidden agenda behind linking these elements to the Vorstius case, "if Lubbertus reacts to everything, he will antagonize King James and the English bishops [who liked the Remonstrants view on State supremacy]."

One of the people who incited Lubbertus to write a response to Grotius's Ordinum Pietas was Johannes Althusius (whom Grotius oddly claimed as influential in his own thought).

In February 1614, Lubbertus, calling Ordinum pietas by Grotius "arrogantia", attacked its reasoning in Responsio Ad Pietatem Hugonis Grotii. Lubbertus and many of his fellow Counter-Remonstrants saw Grotius' multiple quotations and "display of academic erudition" as sophistry, though Grotius saw them as necessary to meet "thereby the scholarly expectations of his time." Lubbertus disputed Grotius competence to consider religious matters since he was a legal expert rather than a trained theologian. Grotius often focused on issues of procedure in the early Church rather than theological content.

Grotius had pointed out that the Anabaptists in Friesland were tolerated and Lubbertus and his supporters were not against toleration as a concept. Historian Hans W. Blom summarizes Lubbertus' view on tolerance, stating that he held one must accept toleration "because a person cannot be forced to believe against his own convictions, and...because there are times and circumstances that make tolerance a matter of practical necessity. ...[but this] did not include the freedom to make thoughts public. The public sermon leaves no room for heterodoxy. One cannot be a heretic with heretics and at the same time recognized by the orthodox as orthodox." Lubbertus accused Vorstius of using deceit to attain a position with the appearance of orthodoxy in order to covertly slip heretical works and ideas into his lesson plans.

Lubbertus called Grotius's selection of quotes from Church Fathers "unfortunate", joining Johannes Bogerman (another Ordinum pietas critic who wrote against it in his Annotationes) in feeling Grotius was disregarding the original context of the quotations to apply them to the current controversy. Lubbertus did not use as many sources as his opponent in his response to Grotius, basing his arguments "mainly on a collection of the acts of councils and a number of quotations of Augustine, and using Stephanus' Thesaurus for broader ancient material". In response to Lubbertus' book, Grotius anonymously published Bona Fides Sibrandi Lubberti in late 1614.

== Later life ==
Lubbertus was married to Truicken van Oosterzee (c. 1550-1625). He died in Franeker on 10 January 1625.
