= History of the Calvinist–Arminian debate =

Christian theological debate

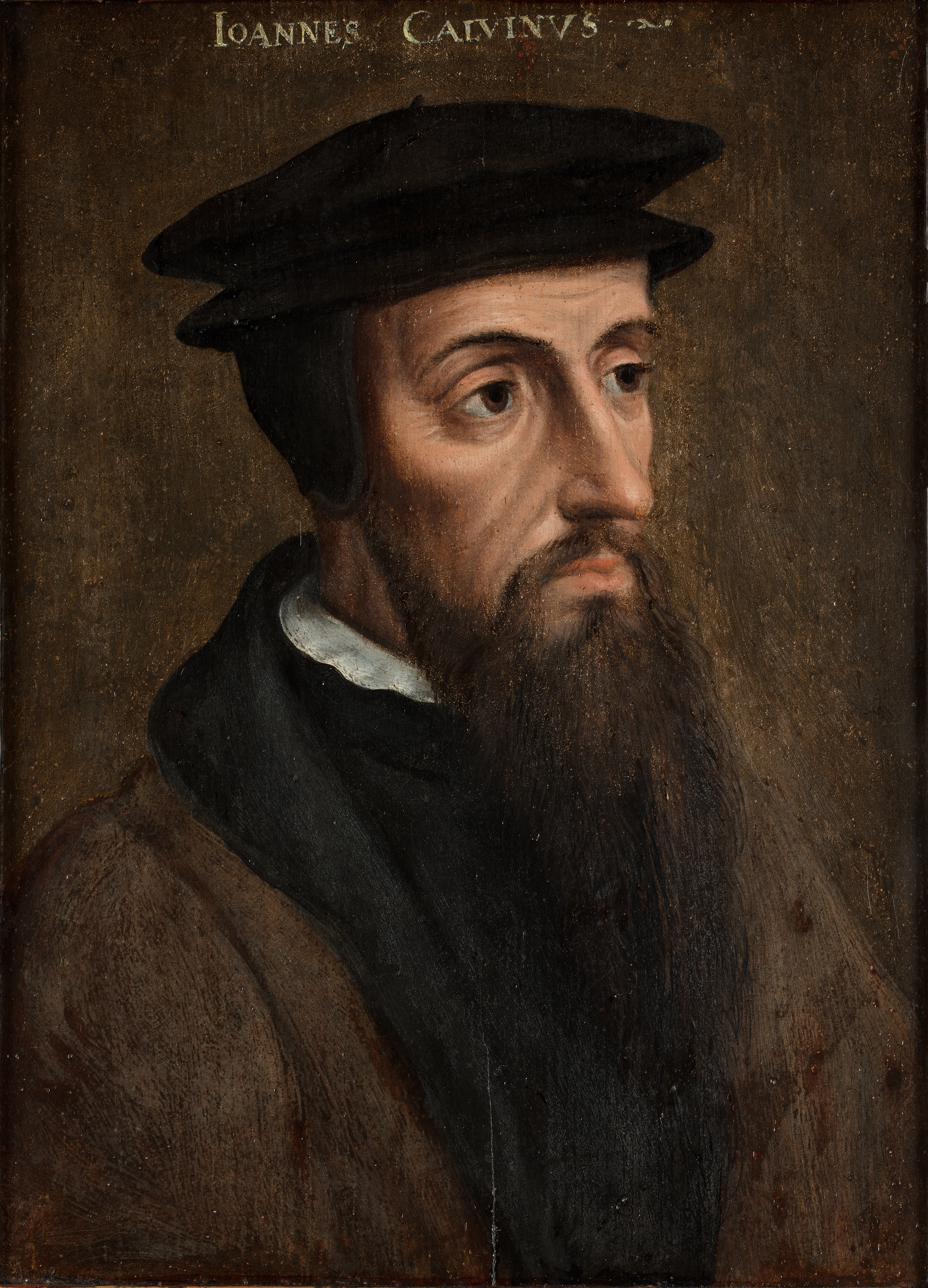
John Calvin (1509–1564), from whose name Calvinism is derived.

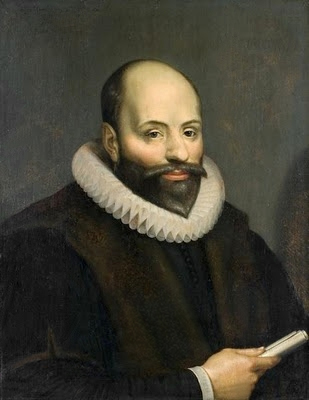
Jacobus Arminius (1560–1609), from whose name Arminianism is derived.

The history of the Calvinist–Arminian debate begins in the early 17th century in the Netherlands with a Christian theological dispute between the followers of John Calvin and Jacobus Arminius and continues today among some Protestants, particularly evangelicals. The debate centers around soteriology (the study of salvation) and includes disputes about total depravity, predestination, and atonement. While the debate was given its Calvinist–Arminian form in the 17th century, issues central to the debate have been discussed in Christianity in some form since Augustine of Hippo's disputes with the Pelagians in the 5th century.

== Theological background ==
=== Augustine and Pelagius ===
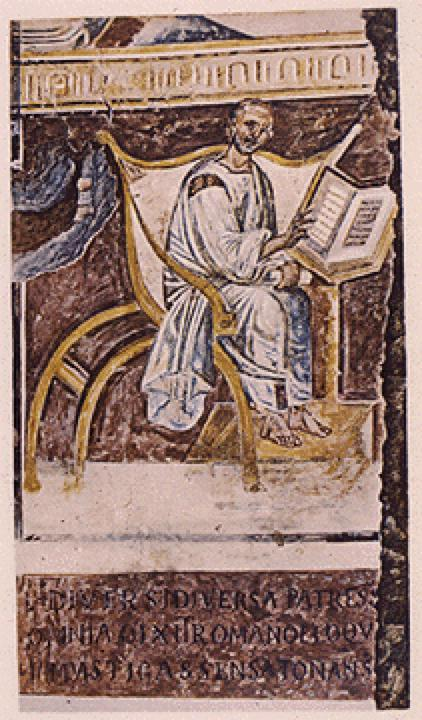
Sixth-century portrait of Augustine of Hippo (354–430) at the Lateran church

Pelagius was a British monk who journeyed to Rome around 400 A.D. and was appalled at what he perceived as the improper behavior within churches. To combat this lack of holiness, he preached a Gospel that began with justification through faith alone (it was actually Pelagius, not Martin Luther, who first added the word alone to Paul's phrase in Ephesians 2:8) but finished through human effort and morality. He had read Augustine's Confessions and believed it to be a fatalistic and pessimistic view of human nature. Pelagius's followers, including Caelestius, went further than their teacher and removed justification through faith, setting up the morality- and works-based salvation known as Pelagianism. The only historical evidence of the teachings of Pelagius or his followers is found through the writings of his two strongest opponents—Augustine and Jerome.

In response to Pelagius, Augustine adopted a theological system that included not only original sin (which Pelagius denied), but also a form of predestination. Some authors maintain that Augustine taught the doctrines of limited atonement and of irresistible grace, later associated with classic Calvinism; however, others insist that Augustine's writings conflict with these doctrines. Critics maintain that part of Augustinian soteriology may have stemmed from his expertise in Greek philosophy, particularly Platonism and Manichaeism, which maintained a high view of a man's spirit and low view of a man's body. Against the Pelagian notion that man can do everything right, he taught that man could do little right. Thus, he reasoned, man cannot even accept the offer of salvation—it must be God who chooses for himself individuals to bring to salvation.

A group of Italian bishops defended the Pelagian view against the Augustinian concept of predestination but was rejected by the Council of Ephesus in 431. Later a monastic movement in southern Gaul (modern-day France) also sought to explain predestination in light of God's foreknowledge, but a flurry of writings from Augustine (Grace and Free Will, Correction and Grace, The Predestination of the Saints and The Gift of Perseverance) helped maintain the papal authority of his doctrines.

=== Semi-Pelagianism and Semi-Augustinianism ===
After the death of Augustine, a more moderate form of Pelagianism persisted, which claimed that man's faith was an act of free will unassisted by previous internal grace. The Second Council of Orange (529) was convened to address whether this moderate form of semi-Pelagianism could be affirmed, or if the doctrines of Augustine were to be affirmed.

The determination of the Council could be considered "semi-Augustinian". It defined that faith, though a free act, resulted (even in its beginnings) from the grace of God, enlightening the human mind and enabling belief. However, it also denied strict predestination, stating "We not only do not believe that any are foreordained to evil by the power of God, but even state with utter abhorrence that if there are those who want to believe so evil a thing, they are anathema." The document received papal sanction.

Calvinist Reformers used the Council's canons to demonstrate that their formulations of original sin and depravity had already been taught much earlier in the church. Arminian theologians also refer to the Council of Orange as a historical document that strongly affirms man's depravity and God's prevenient grace but does not present grace as irresistible or adhere to a strictly Augustinian view of predestination.

=== Middle Ages ===
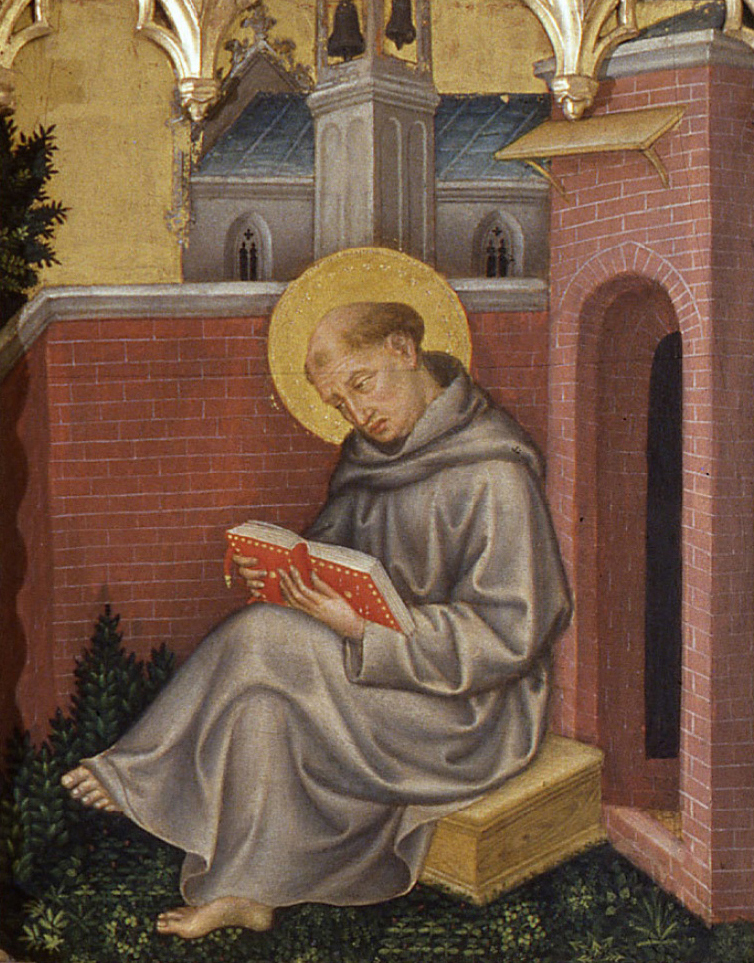
Thomas Aquinas (1225–1274) in a portrait, c. 1400, by Gentile da Fabriano

Augustine's teaching on divine grace was considered a touchstone of orthodoxy within the western church throughout the Middle Ages. Nevertheless, within an Augustinian context, theologians continued to debate the precise nature of God and man's participation in salvation, as well as attempting to work out a place for the church's emerging system of sacraments in the overall scheme of salvation.

Thomas Aquinas, the most influential Catholic theologian of the Middle Ages, taught that, from man's fallen state, there were three steps to salvation:

1. Infusion of grace (infusio gratiae) – God infuses grace into the human soul – the Christian now has faith and, with it, the ability to do good – this step is entirely God's work and is not done by man, and once a man has faith, he can never entirely lose it – however, faith alone is not enough for salvation;
2. Faith formed by charity (fides caritate formata) – with man's free will restored, man must now do his best to do good works in order to have a faith formed by charity; and then;
3. Condign merit (meritum de condigno) – God then judges and awards eternal life on the basis of these good works which Aquinas called man's condign merit.

Aquinas believed that by this system, he had reconciled Ephesians 2:8 ("By grace are ye saved through faith, and that not of yourselves: it is the gift of God") and James 2:20 ("faith without works is dead") and 2:24 ("by works a man is justified and not by faith only"), and had provided an exposition of the Bible's teaching on salvation compatible with Augustine's teachings.

A second stream of medieval thought, commonly held by the Ockhamists, rejected Aquinas’ system as destroying man's free will. The Ockhamists argued that if a man loved God simply because of "infused grace", then man did not love God freely. They argued that before a man received an infusion of grace, man must do his best in a state of nature (i.e. based on man's reason and inborn moral sense). They argued that just as God awards eternal life on the basis of man's condign merit for doing his best to do good works after receiving faith as a gift from God, so too, the original infusion of grace was given to man on the basis of "congruent merit", a reward for man's doing his best in a state of nature. (Unlike condign merit, which is fully deserved by man, congruent merit is not fully deserved and includes a measure of grace on God's part. Congruent merit is therefore also sometimes called "semi-merit". According to the Ockhamists, a gracious God awards an individual with congruent merit when he or she does the best that he or she is able to do.)

Aquinas’ followers, commonly referred to as the Thomists, accused the Ockhamists of Pelagianism for basing the infusion of grace on man's works. The Ockhamists defended themselves from charges of Pelagianism by arguing that, in the Ockhamist system, God was not bound to award the infusion of grace on the basis of congruent merit; rather, God's decision to award the infusion of grace on the basis of congruent merit was an entirely gracious act on God's part.

Luther's condemnation of "justification by works" clearly condemned Ockhamism. Some proponents of ecumenism argue that the Thomist view of salvation is not opposed to Luther's view of grace, and, since Ockhamism was rejected as semi-Pelagian by the Catholic Church at the Council of Trent, theology of salvation need not pose a bar to Protestant-Catholic reunion. (The major streams of modern Catholic thought on the theology of salvation are Thomism and Molinism, a theology developed by Jesuit theologian Luis Molina in the 16th century and also held today by some Protestants such as William Lane Craig and Alvin Plantinga.)

However, since the Catholic Church's rejection of Jansenism in the bull Unigenitus (1713), it has been clear that Calvinism could not be accommodated within Catholicism. Arminianism, on the other hand, while it might not square entirely with Catholic theologies of salvation, probably could be accommodated within the Catholic Church, a fact which Arminianism's Protestant opponents have often pointed out. (Augustus Toplady, for example, famously claimed that Arminianism was the "Road to Rome.")

=== Martin Luther and Erasmus of Rotterdam ===
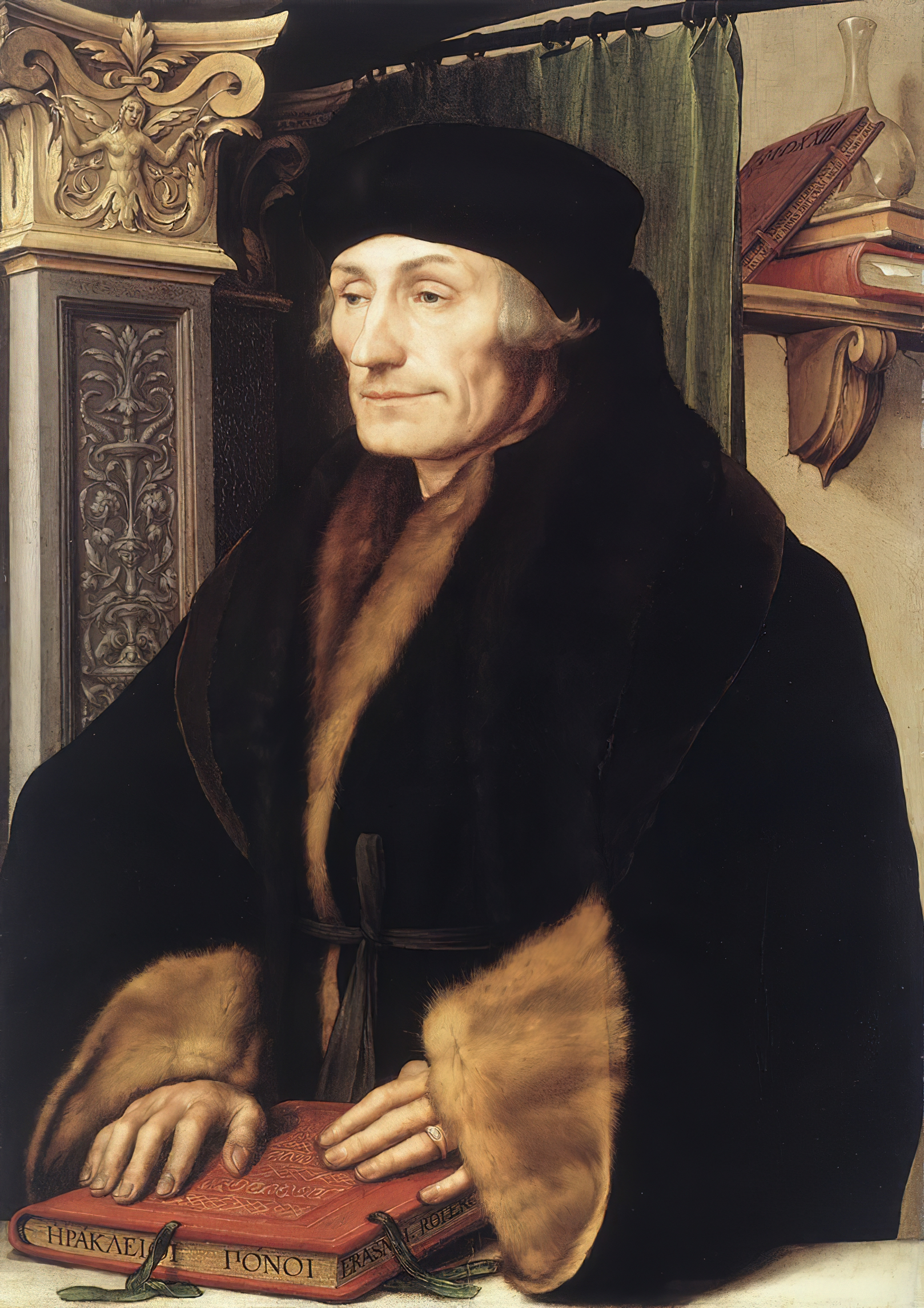
Desiderius Erasmus (1466/69–1536) in a 1523 portrait by Hans Holbein the Younger

Martin Luther was an Augustinian friar in Erfurt. In his Disputation Against Scholastic Theology of 4 September 1517, Luther entered into the medieval debate between the Thomists and the Ockhamists by attacking the Ockhamist position and arguing that man by nature lacks the ability to do good that the Ockhamists asserted he had (and thus denying that man could do anything to deserve congruent merit). Modern scholars disagree about whether Luther in fact intended to criticize all scholastics in this Disputation or if he was concerned only with the Ockhamists. Arguing in favor of a broader interpretation is the fact that Luther went on to criticize the use of Aristotle in theology (Aristotle was the basis of Thomist as well as Ockhamist theology). If this is the case, it is likely that Luther saw Aquinas' fides caritate formata as merely a more cautious form of Pelagianism (or as semi-Pelagianism).

Luther continued to defend these views. In 1520, Pope Leo X issued the papal bull Exsurge Domine, which condemned a position which Luther had maintained at the 1518 Heidelberg Disputation, namely that "After the Fall free will is something in name only and when it does what is in it, it sins mortally." Luther subsequently defended the proposition in his Defense and Explanation of All the Articles Unjustly Condemned by the Roman Bull of Leo X (1520), in the process stating that "free will is really a fiction...with no reality, because it is in no man's power to plan any evil or good. As the article of John Wycliffe, condemned at the Council of Constance, teaches: everything takes place by absolute necessity."

Erasmus, though sympathetic to Luther at first, reacted negatively to what he saw as Luther's determinism. In his De libero arbitrio diatribe sive collatio (A Disquisition on Freedom of the Will) (1524), Erasmus caricatures the limitations of free will that he saw Luther espousing. Though at times in the diatribe, Erasmus sounds like an Ockhamist, for the most part he attempts to espouse a middle course between grace and free will, attempting to avoid on the one hand the errors of the Pelagians and the Ockhamists, and on the other hand, the "Manichaean" error of Luther and other strict Augustinians.

Luther responded with his De Servo Arbitrio (On the Bondage of the Will) (1525) in which he argues that man was not free to do good. Rather, man's fallen nature is in bondage to sin and to Satan, and man can only do evil. The only way an individual can be saved is if God freely chooses to give that person the gift of faith. Luther's position in On the Bondage of the Will became the position adopted by the Protestant movement.

== Jacobus Arminius and the Synod of Dort ==
Jacobus Arminius enrolled at Leiden University, and after five years of education he traveled in the early 1580s to study in Geneva, Switzerland. Theodore Beza was the chairman of theology at the university there. Beza later defended Arminius by saying "let it be known to you that from the time Arminius returned to us from Basel, his life and learning both have so approved themselves to us, that we hope the best of him in every respect…" In late 1587 Arminius returned to Amsterdam to fulfill his desire to be a pastor.

Arminius' entry into the predestination debate in Amsterdam was two years after his return, when he was asked by city officials to refute a modified form of Beza's lapsarianism. According to tradition, Arminius' study of the Scriptures led him to conclude that the Bible did not support Calvinism. Other scholars believe that Arminius never accepted Beza's views, even while a student at Geneva. Arminius avoided adding to the controversy apart from two incidents regarding sermons on Romans 7 and Romans 9.

When Arminius received his doctorate and professorship of theology at Leiden in 1603, the debate over Calvinism came back to life. Conflicts over predestination had appeared early in the Dutch Reformed Church, but "these had been of a local nature, occurring between two fellow ministers, for instance, but since the appointment of Jacobus Arminius as a professor at Leyden University (1603) the strife had moved to the place where the education of future ministers took place." Arminius taught that Calvinist predestination and unconditional election made God the author of evil. Instead, Arminius insisted God's election was an election of believers and therefore was conditioned on faith. Furthermore, Arminius argued, God's exhaustive foreknowledge did not require a doctrine of determinism.

Arminius and his followers believed that a national synod should confer, to win tolerance for their views. His opponents in the Dutch Reformed Church maintained the authority of local synods and denied the necessity of a national convention. When the States of Holland called together the parties, Arminius's opponents, led by his colleague Franciscus Gomarus, accused him not only of the teaching of the doctrines characteristic of Arminianism as it would become (see below), but also of errors on the authority of Scripture, the Trinity, original sin, and works salvation. These charges Arminius denied, citing agreement with both Calvin and Scripture. Arminius was acquitted of any doctrinal error. He then accepted an invitation to a "friendly conference" with Gomarus, but his health caused the conference to end prematurely. Two months later, on 19 October 1609, Arminius died.

=== The Remonstrants and Calvinist reaction ===
After the death of Arminius, The Hague court chaplain Johannes Wtenbogaert agreed with Arminius, saying he was one "who dogmatically and theologically was on one line with him, but who in the field of Church politics was a much more radical supporter of state influence championed his cause". This was seen as a betrayal on Gomarus' side, for earlier in his career (as a minister of Utrecht, Holland) Wtenbogaert "had resisted state influence with all his might".

Gradually Arminian-minded candidates for ordination into the ministry ran into ever greater difficulties. In their classes examinations, not only was subscription to the Dutch Confession and the Heidelberg Catechism demanded (which most were willing to do), "but they were asked questions that were formulated in such a way that ambiguous answers were no longer possible." In reaction to this growing pressure Wtenbogaert drew up a petition to the State General, called a Remonstrance in late 1609 and/or early 1610. The "Remonstrants" highlighted five aspects of their theology: (1) election was conditional on foreseen faith; (2) Christ's atonement was unlimited in extent; (3) total depravity; (4) prevenient and resistible grace; and (5) necessity of perseverance and the possibility of apostasy. The Remonstrants first expressed an uncertainty about the possibility of apostasy. They removed it in the document they presented officially at the Synod of Dort, The Opinion of The Remonstrants (1618), holding to conditional preservation of the saints.

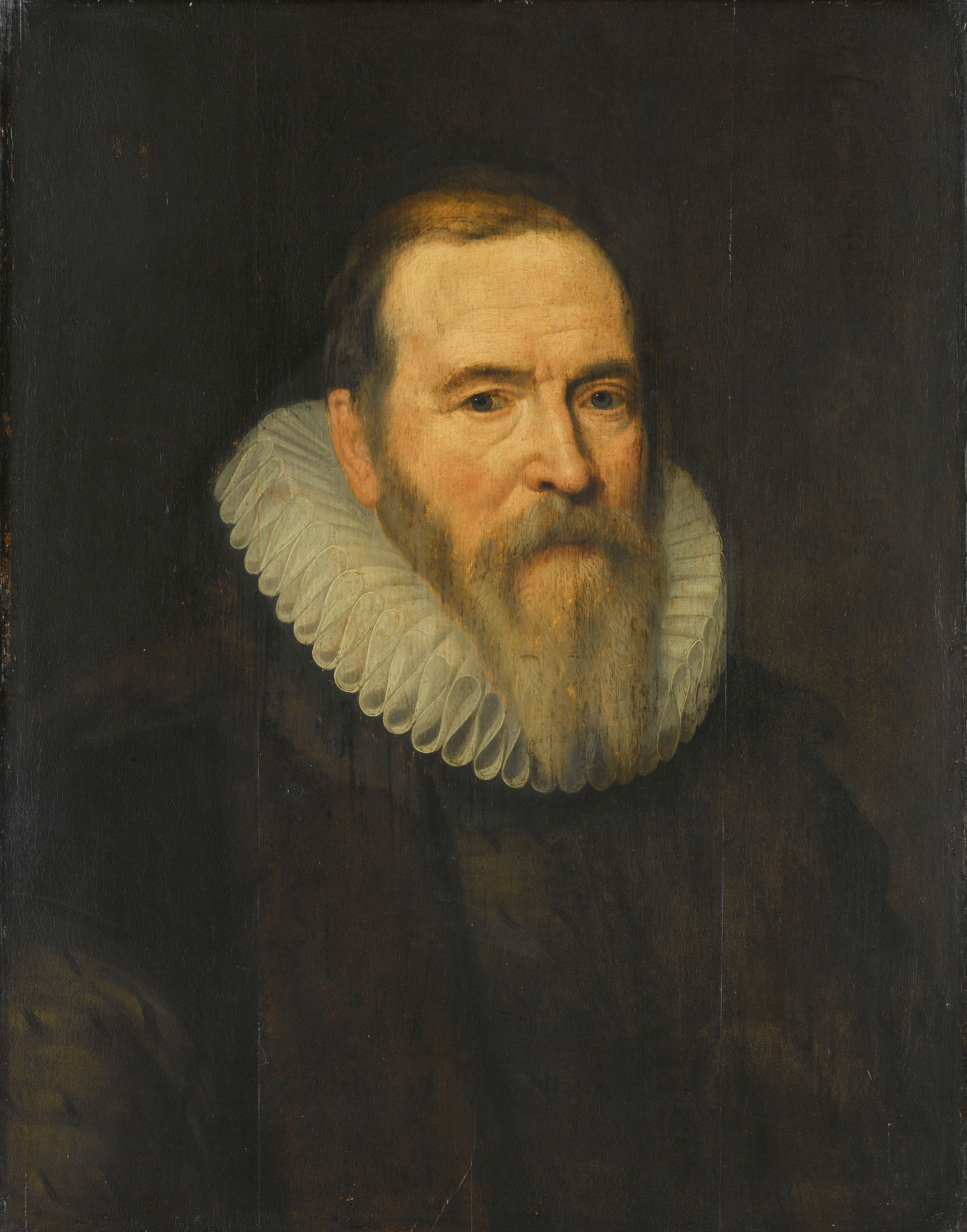
Johan van Oldenbarnevelt (1547–1619), political leader of the Remonstrants

Forty-four ministers (mostly from the province of Holland) signed the Remonstrance, and on 14 January 1610 it was submitted to the Grand Pensionary, Johan van Oldenbarnevelt. (Due to this document, the followers of Arminius became known as Remonstrants.) Oldenbarnevelt held onto the Remonstrance for an unusually long period and it was not until June 1610 that it was submitted in an altered form to the States of Holland. "The States sent the five articles to all classes, forbidding them to go 'higher' in their examinations of ordinands than what was expressed in the articles. Needless to say, most classes did not take the slightest notice of this prohibition."

In another attempt to avoid a provincial synod, the States held The Hague Conference which lasted from 11 March to 20 May 1611 (with intermissions). It was at this conference that the delegates of Arminius' opponents submitted a response to the Remonstrance, called the Counter-Remonstrance (from which the name Contra- or Counter-Remonstrants was given them).

Leading influences among Arminius' followers were Wtenbogaert, Hugo Grotius, and Simon Episcopius. Due to the Remonstrants’ view of the supremacy of civil authorities over church matters, King James I of England came out in support of the Remonstrance (later he would join with their opponents against Conrad Vorstius). Behind the theological debate lay a political one between Prince Maurice, a strong military leader, and his former mentor Oldenbarnevelt, who was the personification of civil power. Maurice, who had Calvinist leanings, desired war with Holland's enemy, Roman Catholic Spain. Oldenbarnevelt, along with Arminius and his followers, desired peace.

Numerous historians hold that many of the civic officials that sided with the Remonstrants did so because of their shared position of State supremacy over the Church and not because of other doctrinal ideas, saying "the alliance between the regents and the Remonstrants during the years of the Truce is merely a coalition suited to the occasion, not the result of principal agreement...the magistracy of Delft, Holland, was Counter-Remonstrant-minded, but in the States of Holland the city supported Oldenbarnevelt's policy regarding the convocation of a National Synod [to avoid calling one]. Incidentally, allegedly Calvinistic opinions went together in Oldenbarnevelt's person."

In the years after Arminius' death, Maurice became convinced that Oldenbarnevelt (and by association, Arminians) had strong Catholic sympathies and were working to deliver Holland to Spain. As insurance, Maurice and his militia systematically and forcibly replaced Remonstrant magistrates with Calvinist ones. Thus, when the State General called for a synod in 1618, its outcome was predetermined. Oldenbarnevelt and Grotius were arrested, and the synod, held at Dordrecht (Dort), was convened. This Synod of Dort included Calvinist representatives from Great Britain, Switzerland, Germany, and France, though Arminians were denied acceptance. Three Arminian delegates from Utrecht managed to gain seats, but were soon forcibly ejected and replaced with Calvinist alternates. The Synod was a six versus six style of representation that lasted over six months with 154 meetings. The synod ultimately ruled that Arminius' teachings were heretical, reaffirming the Belgic Confession and Heidelberg Catechism as its orthodox statements of doctrine. One of the results of the synod was the formation of the five points of Calvinism in direct response to the five articles of the Remonstrants.

Robert Picirilli gives this summary of the aftermath of the Synod of Dort:

"Punishment for the Remonstrants, now officially condemned as heretics and therefore under severe judgement of both church and state, was severe. All Arminian pastors—some 200 of them—were deprived of office; any who would not agree to be silent were banished from the country. Spies were paid to hunt down those suspected of returning to their homeland. Some were imprisoned, among them Grotius; but he escaped and fled the country. Five days after the synod was over, Oldenbarnevelt was beheaded.

Somewhat later, after Maurice died, the Remonstrants were accorded toleration by the state and granted the freedom to follow their religion in peace, to build churches and schools. The Remonstrant Theological Seminary was instituted in Amsterdam, and Episcopius and Grotius were among its first professors. Today both the seminary and the church have shifted from their founders' theology.

== Seventeenth century English politics ==
Early Stuart society was religious, and religion at that time was political. King James I managed religious conflicts for most of the 1610s, but most Protestants maintained a fear of Catholicism. Though Arminians were Protestant, they were perceived as being less antagonistic to Catholicism than the Calvinists were. James I initially moved to keep them out of his realm and supported the official position of the Synod of Dort.

In 1618, the Thirty Years' War began. It was a religious war, and many of James's subjects (particularly in Parliament) wanted his kingdom to go to war on the side of the king's son-in-law, Frederick V, Elector Palatine. James, however, preferred diplomacy. The loudest of the supporters for war were Puritans, a term presenting difficulties of definition but who doctrinally were in general orthodox Calvinists. Some scholars believe that the Arminians' support for the king's efforts to prevent war led to him promoting a number of them in order to balance out the Puritans. Others argue that these promotions were simply the result of meritocratic considerations: 'James promoted Arminians because they were scholarly, diligent and able men in their diocese.'

In 1625, James I died, leaving the throne to his son, Charles I. Charles supported the Arminians and continued the trend of promoting them. The religious changes which Charles imposed on his subjects, in the form of Laudianism, were identified (rightly or wrongly) with Arminian theology. They brought him into direct conflict with the Scottish Presbyterian Calvinists of the Church of Scotland. The resulting Bishops' Wars were a trigger for the English Civil War, both of them part of the larger Wars of the Three Kingdoms which had complex roots, among which religious beliefs were a major factor.

== Early Methodism ==
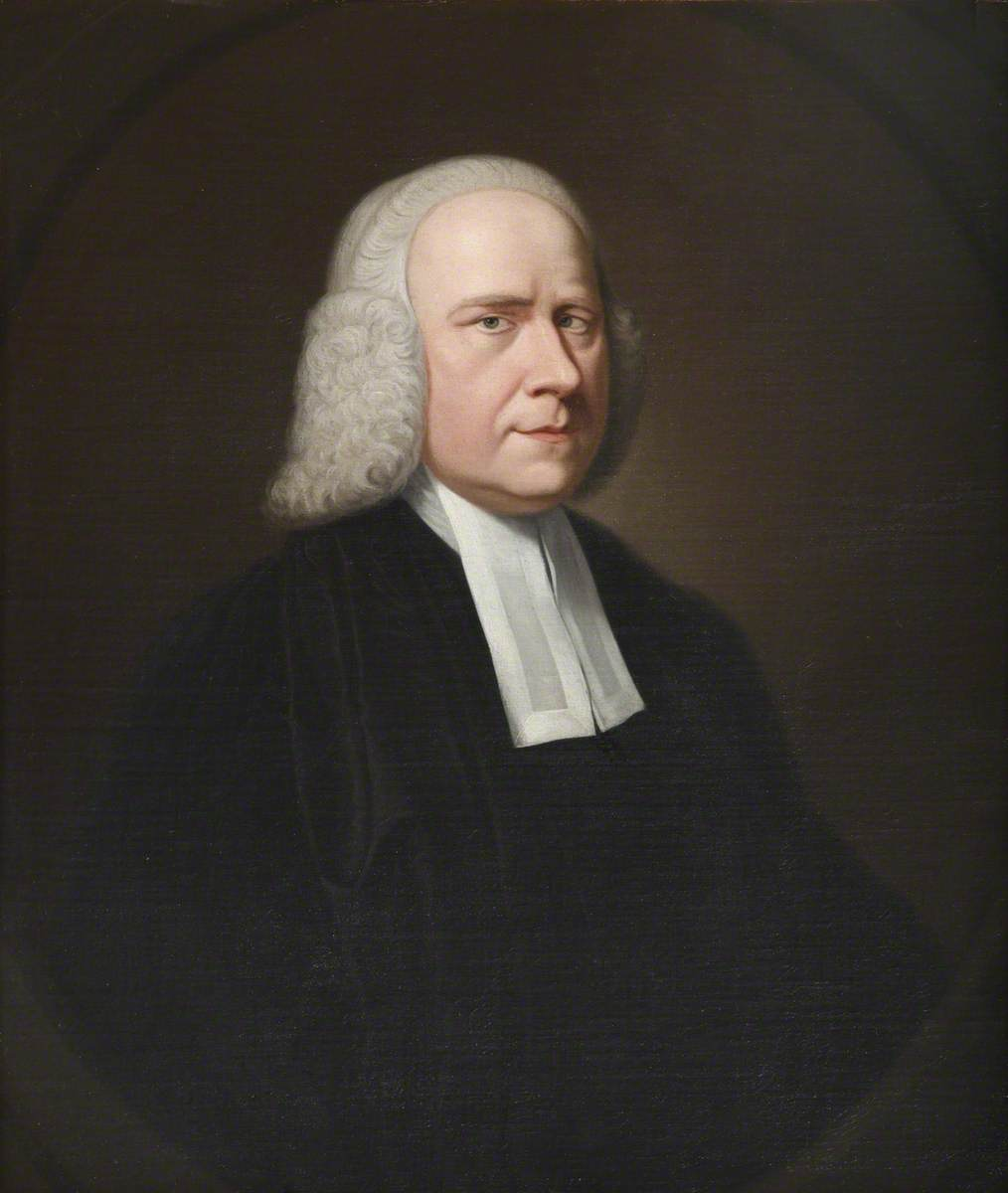
George Whitefield worked with John Wesley in the founding of Methodism, but remained a Calvinist and broke with Wesley when Wesley became an Arminian.

These theological issues played a divisive part in the early history of Methodism in the 18th century. Heated discussions on Arminianism took place between Methodist ministers John Wesley and George Whitefield. From 1740 Wesley broke with Calvinism. His position caused initially the rupture with the Welsh Calvinistic Methodists under Howell Harris in 1742–1743; and then the creation of the Countess of Huntingdon's Connexion in 1756, about the same time when Wesley broke with James Hervey. In the 1770s, a sharp debate occurred between Wesley and Augustus Montague Toplady.

Wesley was a champion of the teaching of Arminius, defending his soteriology in a periodical entitled The Arminian and writing articles such as Predestination Calmly Considered. He defended Arminius against charges of semi-Pelagianism, holding strongly to beliefs in original sin and total depravity. At the same time, Wesley attacked the determinism that he claimed characterized unconditional election and maintained a belief in the ability to lose salvation. Whitefield debated Wesley on every point (except for their agreement on total depravity) but did not introduce any additional elements into the Calvinists' conclusions set forth at Westminster.

== Views ==
=== Protestantism ===
To this day, Methodism and offshoots of the movement: Pentecostals, and Third Wave, along with General Baptists, usually are the ones to subscribe to Arminianism, while Presbyterians, Reformed Churches, Reformed Baptists, and others subscribe to Calvinism. Largely because of its origins in Germany and Scandinavia rather than the British Isles or Holland, Lutheranism was distanced from the dispute, and official Lutheran doctrine does not fully align with either side, preferring instead its own doctrinal formulations about the relation of human freedom to divine sovereignty.

Restorationist fellowships are customarily free will in their soteriology. Within this trend, Churches of Christ are prone to cite Biblical passages in support of the view while often intensely locked in contention with Presbyterians and (usually Calvinistic) Baptists. The doctrinal components, in small towns particularly in the United States, often ally the Churches of Christ with their Methodist neighbors on opposition to "once-saved-always-saved" doctrine despite the similarity between Churches of Christ and Baptists on immersion baptism.

=== Roman Catholicism ===
While most Roman Catholic theologians reject a strict doctrine of double predestination (the Calvinist belief), a minority in the early 16th century saw it as consistent with their Augustinian heritage. Post-Reformation Roman Catholicism has remained largely outside the debate, although Thomist and Molinist views continue within the church. Augustinian theodicy, including those elements wherein Calvin was influenced by Augustine, continues to be the prevalent soteriology in Roman Catholicism. Also, Jansenism has been seen by many as similar to Calvinist doctrine and was condemned as such by the Catholic Church in the late 17th century.

=== Eastern Orthodoxy ===
The Synod of Jerusalem of Eastern Orthodox Churches was called in 1672 to refute attempted encroachments of Protestant Calvinism. The synod strongly rejected Calvinistic formulations and named them heresy. In part, it states,

We believe the most good God to have from eternity predestinated unto glory those whom He hath chosen, and to have consigned unto condemnation those whom He hath rejected; but not so that He would justify the one, and consign and condemn the other without cause....since He foreknew the one would make a right use of their free-will, and the other a wrong, He predestinated the one, or condemned the other.

In the same document, the synod renounces Calvin by name and pronounces an anathema upon anyone teaching that God predestined anyone to evil or Hell.

== See also ==
- Libertarianism
- Monergism
- Semicompatibilism
- Sovereignty of God
- Synergism
- Theological determinism
