= Festus Hommius =

Dutch Calvinist theologian

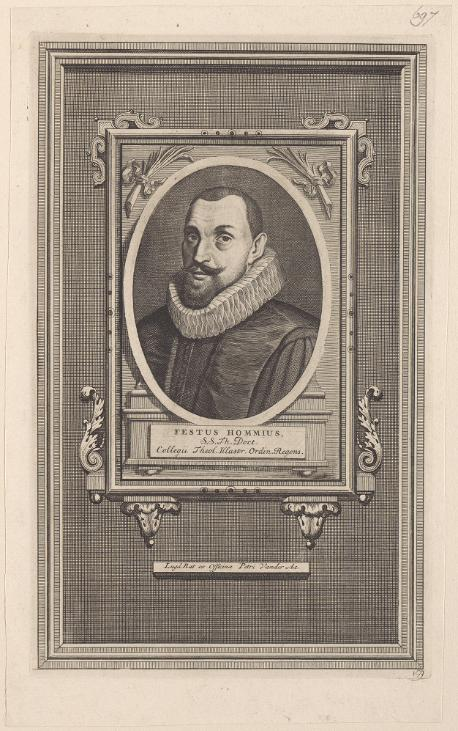
Festus Hommius (Collection Leiden University Library)

Festus Hommius (10 February 1576 – 5 July 1642) was a Dutch Calvinist theologian.

== Life ==
He was born in Jelsum, into a noted Frisian family. He studied from 1593 at the University of Franeker under Sibrandus Lubbertus, travelled in 1595 to the Huguenot stronghold of La Rochelle and completed his studies from 1596 at the University of Leiden. Around 1597 Hommius became preacher of Warmond, near Leiden.

In 1599 he became preacher at Dokkum. From 1602 preacher at Leiden, he rapidly became drawn into the conflict around Jacobus Arminius. Hommius became a partisan of Franciscus Gomarus, the opponent of Arminius on the Leiden faculty. He published polemical books and attended conferences with Remonstrant leaders such as Johannes Wtenbogaert.

He was a leading publicist of the Contra-Remonstrants, attacking the Five Articles of Remonstrance. He traced their connection to free-thinking, Socinianism and atheism.

He tried to have Dutch congregations in England represented at the Synod of Dort; this appeal to the Dutch government resulted in the presence of Carolus Liebaert as observer. He died in Leiden, aged 66.
