= Jacobus Arminius =

Dutch theologian (1560–1609)

The Reverend Jacobus Arminius
- Jakob Hermanszoon
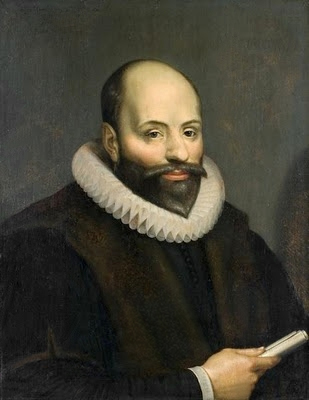
- Jacobus Arminius (1620) by David Bailly
- Born: 10 October 1560; Oudewater, Spanish Netherlands, Holy Roman Empire
- Died: 19 October 1609 (aged 49); Leiden, Dutch Republic
- Education: Leiden University
- Occupations: Pastor, theologian
- Spouse: Lijsbet Reael
- Theological work
- Era: Reformation
- Tradition or movement: Arminianism
- Main interests: Soteriology
- Notable ideas: Prevenient grace, conditional preservation of the saints

Jacobus Arminius (/ɑːrˈmɪniəs/; Dutch: Jakob Hermanszoon; (Note: Jacobus Arminius is the Latinized name of Jakob Hermanszoon; he was also known as Jakob Herman and the Anglicized names of Jacob Arminius and James Arminius.) 10 October 1560 – 19 October 1609) was a Dutch Reformed minister and theologian during the Protestant Reformation period whose views became the basis of Arminianism and the Dutch Remonstrant movement. He served from 1603 as professor in theology at the University of Leiden and wrote many books and treatises on theology.

Following his death, his challenge to the Reformed standard, the Belgic Confession, provoked ample discussion at the Synod of Dort, which crafted the five points of Calvinism in response to Arminius's teaching.

== Early life ==
Jakob Hermanszoon was born in 1559 or 1560 in Oudewater, Utrecht, Netherlands. He became an orphan while still young. His father Herman, a manufacturer of weapons, died, leaving his wife a widow with small children. He never knew his father, and his mother was killed during the Spanish massacre at Oudewater in 1575.

The child was adopted by Theodorus Aemilius, a priest inclined towards Protestantism. Around 1572 (the year Oudewater was conquered by the rebels), Arminius and Aemilius settled in Utrecht. The young Jacobus studied there, probably at the Hieronymusschool. After the death of Aemilius (1574 or 1575), Arminius became acquainted with the mathematician Rudolph Snellius, also from Oudewater. Snellius brought Arminius to Marburg and enabled him to study at the Leiden University.

== Theological studies and ministry ==
Arminius remained a student at Leiden from 1576 to 1582. Although he enrolled as a student in liberal arts, this allowed him to pursue an education in theology. His teachers in theology included Calvinist Lambertus Danaeus, Hebrew scholar Johannes Drusius, Guillaume Feuguereius (or Feugueires, d. 1613), and Johann Kolmann. Kolmann is now known for teaching that the overemphasis of God's sovereignty in high Calvinism made God "a tyrant and an executioner". Although the university in Leiden was solidly Reformed, it had influences from Lutheran, Zwinglian, and Anabaptist views in addition to Calvinism. One Leiden pastor (Caspar Coolhaes) held—in opposition to John Calvin—that civil authorities did have jurisdiction in some church affairs, that it was wrong to punish and execute heretics, and that Lutherans, Calvinists, and Anabaptists could unite around core tenets. The astronomer and mathematician Willebrord Snellius used Ramist philosophy in an effort to encourage his students to pursue truth without over reliance on Aristotle. Under the influence of these men, Arminius studied with success and may have had seeds planted that would begin to develop into a theology that would later question the dominant Reformed theology of Calvin. The success he showed in his studies motivated the merchants guild of Amsterdam to fund the next three years of his studies.

In 1582 Arminius began studying under Theodore Beza at Geneva. He found himself under pressure for using Ramist philosophical methods, familiar to him from his time at Leiden. Arminius was publicly forbidden to teach Ramean philosophy. After this difficult state of affairs, he moved to Basel to continue his studies. He continued to distinguish himself there as an excellent student. In 1583 Arminius was contemplating a return to Geneva when the theological faculty at Basel spontaneously offered him a doctorate. He declined the honor on account of his youth (he was about 24) and returned to the school in Geneva to finish his schooling under Beza.

=== Commendations ===
Upon the conclusion of Arminius' studies and a request for him to pastor in Amsterdam, Beza replied to leaders in Amsterdam with this letter:

"...Let it be known to you that from the time Arminius returned to us from Basel, his life and learning both have so approved themselves to us, that we hope for the best from him in every respect, if he steadily persists in the same course, which, by the blessing of God, we doubt not he will; for, among other endowments, God has given him an intellect well-suited both to the apprehension and to the discrimination of things. If this henceforward be regulated by piety, which he appears assiduously to cultivate, it cannot but happen that this power of intellect, when consolidated by mature age and experience, will be productive of the richest fruits. Such is our opinion of Arminius — a young man, unquestionably, so far as we are able to judge, most worthy of your kindness and liberality" (Letter of 3 June 1585 from Beza to Amsterdam).

From this letter it would seem that the earlier tension from Arminius' attraction to Ramist philosophy had dissipated and Arminius was known even to Beza as an excellent though budding theologian. Three months later, John Grynaeus at the University of Basel sent this letter of commendation:

"To pious readers, greeting: 'Inasmuch as a faithful testimonial of learning and piety ought not to be refused to any learned and pious man, so neither to James Arminius, a native of Amsterdam [sic], for his deportment while he attended the University of Basel was marked by piety, moderation, and assiduity in study; and very often, in the course of our theological discussions, he made his gift of a discerning spirit so manifest to all of us, as to elicit from us well-merited congratulations. More recently, too, in certain extraordinary prelections delivered with the consent, and by the order, of the Theological Faculty, in which he publicly expounded a few chapters of the Epistle to the Romans, he gave us the best ground to hope that he was destined erelong — if, indeed, he goes on to stir up the gift of God that is in him — to undertake and sustain the function of teaching, to which he may be lawfully set apart, with much fruit to the Church. I commend him, accordingly, to all good men, and, in particular, to the Church of God in the famous city of Amsterdam; and I respectfully entreat that regard may be had to that learned and pious youth, so that he may never be under the necessity of intermitting theological studies which have been thus far so happily prosecuted. Farewell ! 'John James Grynaeus, Professor of Sacred Literature, and Dean of the Theological Faculty. — Written with mine own hand. Basle, 3rd September, 1583."

=== Beginning of public ministry ===
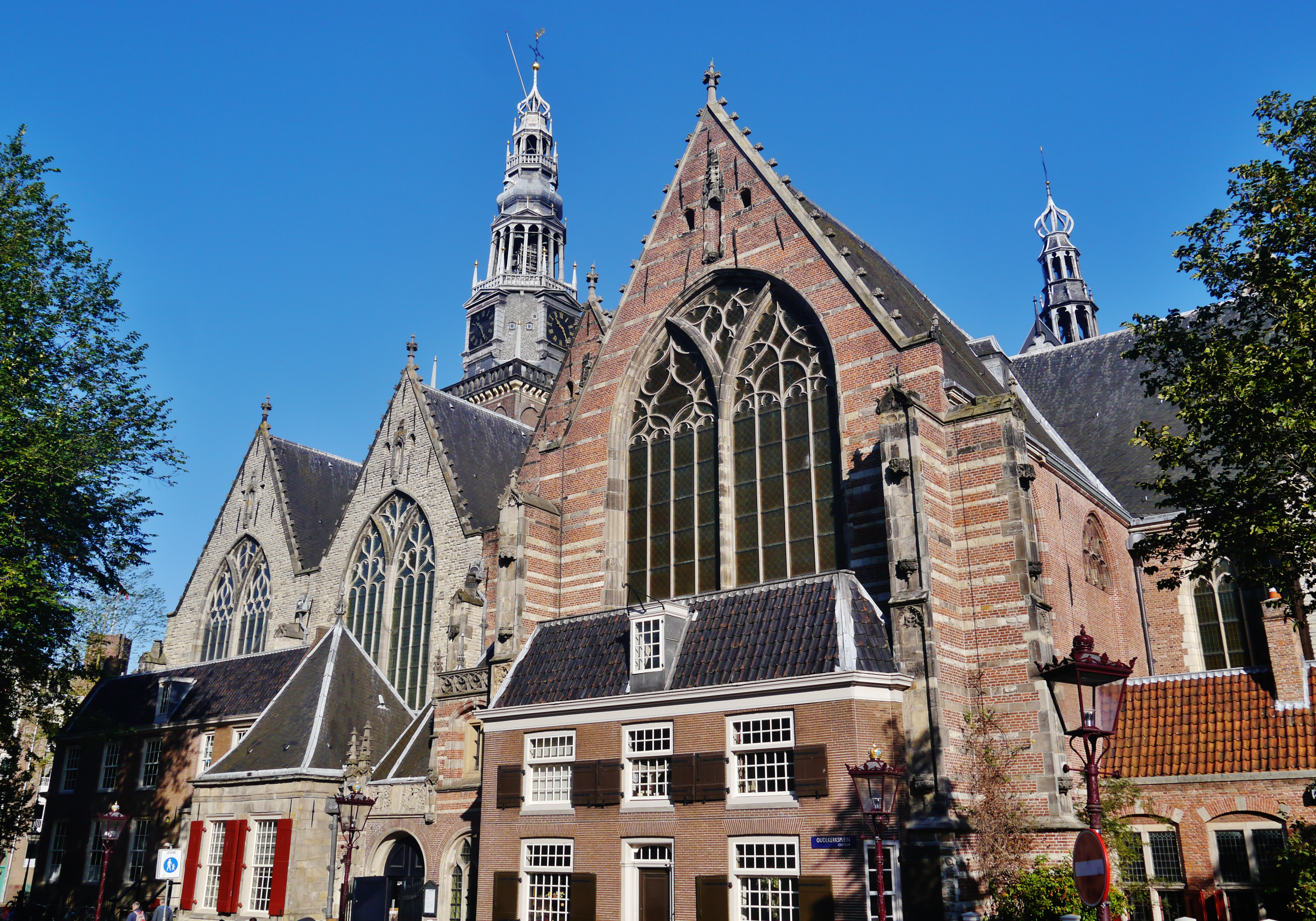
Old Church, Amsterdam, where Arminius was pastor from 1587 to 1603.

Arminius answered the call to pastor at Amsterdam in 1587, delivering Sunday and midweek sermons. After being tested by the church leaders, he was ordained in 1588. One of Arminius' first tasks was given to him by Ecclesiastical Court of Amsterdam; namely, to refute the teachings of Dirck Coornhert, who rejected Beza's supralapsarian doctrine of God's absolute and unconditional decree to create men so as to save some and damn others, based on nothing in themselves. The discussion had already begun with two ministers at Delft who had written "An Answer to certain Arguments of Beza and Calvin, from a Treatise on Predestination as taught in the Ninth Chapter of Romans" a document which contradicted both Beza and Coornhert. They proposed that although God's decree to save only some was indeed absolute and unconditional, it had occurred after the fall (proposing infralapsarianism rather than Beza's supralapsarianism). Arminius was tasked with refuting both Coornhert and infralapsarianism theology. He readily agreed to the task, but after greater study he was conflicted over the matter. He determined to spend greater time in study before continuing his refutation.

In 1590 he married Lijsbet Reael, the daughter of Laurens Jacobsz Reael, a prominent merchant and poet in Amsterdam who also helped lead the Protestant Reformation and later helped establish the first Reformed Church in the area. Arminius's marriage to Reael allowed him access to her prestigious connections, and he made many friends in the merchant industry and high society. He was commissioned to organize the educational system of Amsterdam and is said to have done it well. He greatly distinguished himself by faithfulness to his duties in 1602 during a plague that swept through Amsterdam, going into infected houses that others did not dare to enter in order to give them water, and supplying their neighbors with funds to care for them.

=== Controversy ===
At Amsterdam, Arminius taught through "a number of sermons on the Epistle of the Romans". In discussing Romans 7 in 1591, he taught that man, through grace and rebirth, did not have to live in bondage to sin, and that Romans 7:14 was speaking of a man living under the law and convicted of sin by the Holy Spirit, yet not presently regenerated. This was met with some resistance, and some detractors labeled him Pelagian for teaching that an unregenerate man could feel such conviction and desire for salvation, even with the influence of the Law and the Holy Spirit. In the same year, responding to Arminius' theological positions, his colleague Petrus Plancius began to dispute him openly. During a gathering of ministers, Arminius insisted he was not teaching anything in contradiction to the Heidelberg Confession and other standards of orthodoxy, that early church theologians held similar views, and that he utterly repudiated the heresy of Pelagianism. Further, Arminius expressed some astonishment that he was not to be allowed to interpret this passage according to the dictates of his own conscience and within the pattern of historic orthodoxy. The Amsterdam burgomasters intervened in an effort to keep the peace and tamp down divisions in the populace, urging them to peacefully coexist and for Arminius to teach nothing out of accord with the Reformed thought agreed upon at the time unless he had consulted with the church council or other bodies.

During the following years, controversy emerged as he preached through Romans 9. Although he did not directly contradict Calvinist interpretations, he focused on Paul's theme of "justification by faith" in contradiction to works, rather than focusing on God's eternal decrees. During this time he gradually developed opinions on grace, predestination and free will that were inconsistent with the doctrine of the Reformed teachers Calvin and Beza.

== Professor at Leiden ==
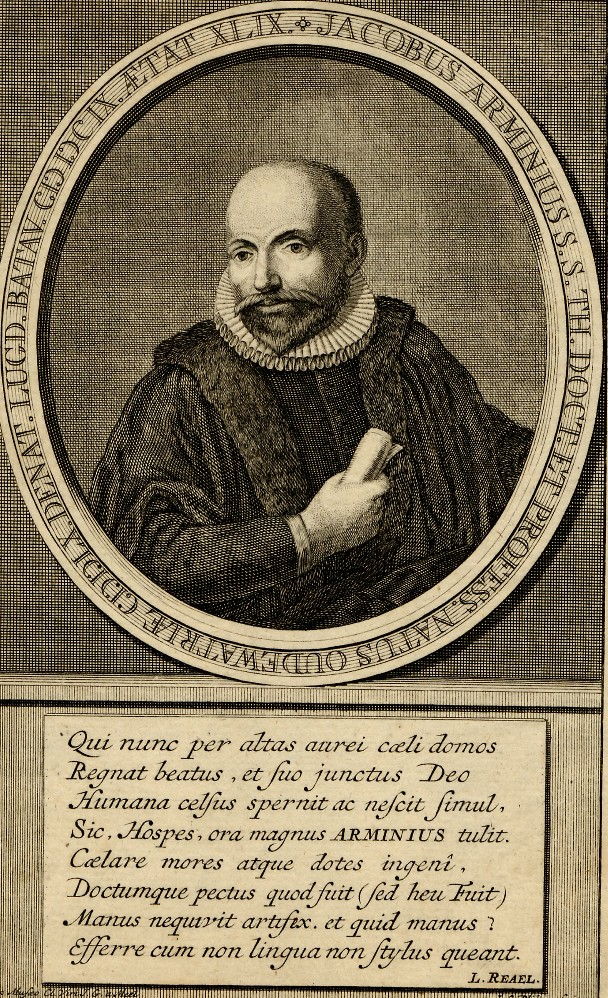
17-century portrait of Arminius from the Dutch portrait collection of the Andover-Harvard Theological Library, Harvard Divinity School. From an engraving by J. C. Philips and J. G. Meet.

In 1603 he was called back to Leiden University to teach theology. This came about after almost simultaneous deaths in 1602 of two faculty members, Franciscus Junius and Lucas Trelcatius the elder, in an outbreak of plague. Trelcatius the younger and Arminius (despite Plancius' protest) were appointed, the decision resting largely with Franciscus Gomarus, the surviving faculty member. While Gomarus cautiously approved Arminius, whose views were already suspected of unorthodoxy, his arrival opened a period of debate rather than closed it. The appointment had also a political dimension, being backed by both Johannes Uytenbogaert at The Hague and Johan van Oldenbarnevelt.

=== Escalating controversy with Gomarus ===
Gomarus, a Fleming who had been in Leiden since 1594, was described by an eye-witness sympathetic to Arminius as "a rather mediocre scholar" but "a forceful defender of the Calvinistic doctrine... a man of deep-rooted faith" In contrast Arminius has been described as "a seeker, a doubter". On the question of predestination Gomarus was a supralapsarian, and it was in debate over this point that the conflict between the two began. Arminius advocated revising the Belgic Confession and the Heidelberg Catechism but was not explicit until much later when the debate became an open conflict.

The dispute took a public turn on 7 February 1604 when Willem Bastingius in his disputation De divina praedestinatione defended several of Arminius's theses with Arminius presiding. This event led Gomarus to have Samuel Gruterus argue an opposite position on 14 October 1604, but the argument was not on the official schedule. Gomarus ascribed the positions he disliked to Calvin's adversary Sebastian Castellio and his follower Coornhert. While Arminius pointed to the Bible to defend his positions, the Calvinist views set forth by "the Genevan patriarchs gradually acquired the force of Res judicata, so that resistance against it was no longer tolerated."

Opponents of Arminius outside the university gradually expanded the controversy. The classis in Dordrecht drew up a gravamen in which "some differences" that "were said to have arisen in the Church and University of Leiden on the doctrine of the Reformed Churches" was laid out. In response the three Leiden professors of theology (Trelcatius joining Arminius and Gomarus) and the Regent of the State College, Johannes Cuchlinus, wrote an indignant letter, stating "that as far as was known to them there was no conflict between the professors on any fundamental doctrine whatsoever."

Gomarus was incited to increase his opposition to Arminius by Leiden minister Festus Hommius and Plancius, Arminius's old opponent. An anonymous series of 31 articles was circulated, "in which all kinds of unorthodox opinions held by Arminius were exposed". Sibrandus Lubbertus, Professor of Theology at the University of Franeker, began sending letters to foreign theologians attacking Arminius with charges of heresy; and one of these letters fell into Arminius's hands. Because his opponents remained anonymous or bypassed official procedures, Arminius in April 1608 requested from the States of Holland permission to expound his views. On 30 May 1608 Arminius and Gomarus were allowed by the States to deliver speeches before the Supreme Court in The Hague. Chief Justice of the Supreme Court Reinout van Brederode (Oldenbarnevelt's son-in-law) concluded that "the points of difference between the two professors, mostly relating to the subtle details of doctrine of predestination, were of minor importance and could co-exist... [and] enjoined both gentlemen to tolerate one another lovingly".

In direct defiance of the court, Gomarus then published the speech he had made before it, and Arminius followed suit by publishing his own speech. In response to the court's opinion Gomarus declared that "he would not dare die holding Arminius' opinion, nor to appear with it before God's judgement seat." Arminius then asked to defend his positions in public or for a national or provincial synod to be called to examine the matter. Seeking to avoid a synod, the States of Holland allowed Arminius to expound on his views to their assembly on 30 October 1608.

Before the assembly, Arminius finally explained his call to rewrite the Belgic Confession and the Heidelberg Catechism, saying that he did not feel obligated to explain his position before, for "as a professor, he considered himself subject only to the authority of the Leiden Curators and the States, not to the Church". Arminius then gave an overview of all the various opinions existing on predestination. He claimed that supralapsarianism was contrary to the Confession and Catechism and that "supra- and infralapsarianism, basically amount to the same thing." Arminius put forward his own view on predestination which he held was in concordance with the Confession and the Catechism.

Learning that Arminius had appeared before the States assembly, Gomarus requested permission to address it as well, which was granted. On 12 December 1608 Gomarus blasted Arminius, accusing "his colleague of being a supporter of Pelagianism and the Jesuits; he also attacked Johannes Wtenbogaert, whom he branded a 'courtly trumpeter.'" The assembly took offence against this polemical tone, which contrasted with Arminius's eirenicism, and ordered the speeches made before them by both men to be banned from publication. Despite the ban the speeches soon appeared in print.

On 25 July 1609 Jacobus Bontebal defended the theses De vocatione hominis ad salutem under Arminius's presidency. A Roman Catholic priest (rumored to be a Jesuit) was in the audience and dared to oppose Arminius' positions. While an already seriously ill Arminius refuted the arguments, Gomarus "who was among the audience, became alternately flushing and deathly pale, and afterwards, while the Papist was within earshot, he insultingly remarked to his colleague that now the door to Papism had been widely opened."

=== Final debate and last days ===
Memorial stone for Jacobus Arminius at St. Peter's Church, Leiden.

Arminius remained as a teacher at Leiden until his death and was valued by his students. Still, the conflict with Gomarus widened out into a large-scale split within Calvinism. Of the local clergy, Adrianus Borrius supported Arminius, while Festus Hommius opposed him. Close friends, students and supporters of Arminius included Johannes Drusius, Conrad Vorstius, Anthony Thysius, Johannes Halsbergius, Petrus Bertius, Johannes Arnoldi Corvinus, as well as the brothers Rembert and Simon Episcopius. His successor at Leiden (again selected with the support of Uytenbogaert and Oldenbarnevelt) was Vorstius, a past influence on Arminius by his writings.

Once again the States attempted to tamp down the growing controversy without calling a synod. Arminius was ordered to attend another conference with Gomarus in The Hague in on 13–14 August 1609. When the conference was to reconvene on 18 August, Arminius' health began to fail and so he returned to Leiden. The States suspended the conference and asked both men for a written reaction to their adversary's viewpoint.

Arminius died on 19 October 1609 at his house at the Pieterskerkhof. He was buried in the Pieterskerk at Leiden, where a memorial stone on his behalf was placed in 1934.

== Theology and legacy ==
In attempting to defend Calvinistic predestination against the teachings of Coornhert, Arminius began to doubt aspects of Calvinism and modified some parts of his own view. He attempted to reform Calvinism and lent his name to a movement—Arminianism—which resisted some of the Calvinist tenets (unconditional election, the nature of the limitation of the atonement, and irresistible grace). The early Dutch followers of his teaching became known as Remonstrants after they issued a document containing five points of disagreement with mainstream Calvinism, entitled Remonstrantiæ (1610). Arminius wrote that he sought to teach only those things which could be proved from the Scriptures and that tended toward edification among Christians (with the exception of Roman Catholics, with whom he said there could be no spiritual accord). His motto was reputed to be "Bona conscientia paradisus", meaning, "A good conscience is a paradise."

Arminius taught of a "preventing" (or prevenient) grace that has been conferred upon all by the Holy Spirit and this grace is "sufficient for belief, in spite of our sinful corruption, and thus for salvation." Arminius states "the grace sufficient for salvation is conferred on the Elect, and on the Non-elect; that, if they will, they may believe or not believe, may be saved or not be saved." William Witt states that "Arminius has a very high theology of grace. He insists emphatically that grace is gratuitous because it is obtained through God's redemption in Christ, not through human effort."

The theology of Arminianism did not become fully developed during Arminius' lifetime, but after his death the Five articles of the Remonstrants (1610) systematized and formalized the ideas. But the Calvinist Synod of Dort (1618–19), convening for the purpose of condemning Arminius' theology, declared it and its adherents anathemas, defined the five points of Calvinism, and persecuted Arminian pastors who remained in the Netherlands. But in spite of persecution, "the Remonstrants continued in Holland as a distinct church and again and again where Calvinism was taught Arminianism raised its head."

In the 18th century John Wesley, the founder of the Methodist Movement, came to his own religious beliefs while in college and through his Aldersgate Experience or epiphany and expressed himself strongly against the doctrines of Calvinistic election and reprobation. His system of thought has become known as Wesleyan Arminianism, the foundations of which were laid by Wesley and his fellow preacher John William Fletcher. Although Wesley knew very little about the beliefs of Arminius and arrived at his religious views independently, Wesley acknowledged late in life—with the 1778 publication of The Arminian Magazine—that he and Arminius were in general agreement. Theology Professor W. Stephen Gunther concludes he was "a faithful representative" of Arminius' beliefs. Wesley was perhaps the clearest English proponent of Arminianism. He embraced Arminian theology and became its most prominent champion. Today, the majority of Methodists remain committed (knowingly or unknowingly) to Arminian theology, and Arminianism has become one of the dominant theological systems in the United States, thanks in large part to the influence of John and Charles Wesley.

== Personal life ==
Arminius and his wife Lijsbet Laurensdochtor Reael, who married in 1590, had 12 children, three of whom died young during infancy. They had ten sons; Harmen (b. 1594), Pieter (b. 1596), Jan (b. 1598), Laurens (b. 1600, died in infancy), Laurens (b. 1601), Jacob (b. 1603), Willem (b. 1605), and Daniel (b. 1606). They had two other sons who also died in infancy, whose names are not part of the public record. Their daughters were Engelte (b. 1593) and Geertruyd (b. 1608). He was survived by his wife and children when he died.

== Notes and references ==
=== Sources ===
- Arminius, Jacobus (1825). The Works of James Arminius, D. D., Formerly Professor of Divinity in the University of Leyden: To which are Added Brandt's Life of the Author, with Considerable Augmentations, Numerous Extracts from His Private Letters, a Copious and Authentic Account of the Synod of Dort and Its Proceedings, and Several Interesting Notices of the Progress of His Theological Opinions in Great Britain and on the Continent. Vol. 1. Translated by James Nichols. Longman, Hurst, Rees, Orme, Brown and Green.
- Arminius, Jacob (1853a). Nichols, James; Bagnall, WR (eds.). The Works of James Arminius, DD, Formerly Professor of Divinity in the University of Leyden. Vol. I. Buffalo, NY: Derby, Miller, & Orton.
- Ballor, Jordan J.; Sytsma, David; Zuidema, Jason (2013). Church and School in Early Modern Protestantism: Studies in Honor of Richard A. Muller on the Maturation of a Theological Tradition. Brill. ISBN 978-90-04-25829-7.
- Bangs, Carl (1985). Arminius: a study in the Dutch Reformation. F. Asbury Press. ISBN 978-0-310-29481-8.
- Bangs, Carl (1986). The Works of James Arminius. Grand Rapids, MI.: Baker Books. pp. 130–136, 150–152.
- Brandt, Kaspar (1854). The Life of James Arminius. London: Ward and Co.
- Chisholm, Hugh, ed. (1911). "Arminius, Jacobus" . Encyclopædia Britannica. Vol. 2 (11th ed.). Cambridge University Press.
- Gonzalez, Justo L. (1983). A History of Christian Thought. Vol. 3. Nashville: Abingdon Press. ISBN 0-687-17178-4.
- Grotius, Hugo (1995). Rabbie, Edwin (ed.). Hugo Grotius, Ordinum Hollandiae AC Westfrisiae Pietas (1613): Critical Edition with English Translation and Commentary. Brill. ISBN 90-04-10385-6.
- Israel, Jonathan (1995). The Dutch Republic: Its Rise, Greatness and Fall, 1477–1806. Oxford: Oxford University Press. ISBN 0-19-873072-1.
- Knight, Henry H. (2018). John Wesley: Optimist of Grace. Eugene, Oregon: Wipf and Stock.
- Kooi, Christine (2000). Liberty and Relligion: Church and State in Leinden's Reformation, 1572-1620. Brill. ISBN 90-04-11643-5.
- Latourette, Kenneth Scott (1975). A History of Christianity. Vol. II. San Francisco: HarperSanFrancisco. ISBN 0-06-064953-4.
- MacCulloch, Diarmaid (2005). The Reformation. Penguin Books. ISBN 978-0-14-303538-1.
- McGrath, Alister E. (2006). Christian Theology: An Introduction. Wiley. ISBN 978-1-4051-5360-7.
- Meij-Tolsma, Marijke (2009). "Introduction". Arminius, Arminianism, and Europe: Jacobus Arminius (1559/60–1609). Leiden: Brill. ISBN 978-9004178878.
- Olson, Roger E. (1999). The Story of Christian Theology: Twenty Centuries of Tradition and Reform. InterVarsity Press. ISBN 978-0-8308-1505-0.
- Picirilli, Robert E. (2002). Grace, Faith, Free Will: Contrasting Views of Salvation. Nashville: Randall House. ISBN 0-89265-648-4.
- Schaff, Philip (1877). "§65 The Arminian Controversy (AD1604-1619)". The Creeds of Christendom: With a History and Critical Notes. Vol. 1. Harper.
- Schaff, Phillip; Herzog, Jakob (1951). "Jacobus Arminius". The New Schaff-Herzog Encyclopedia of Religious Knowledge. Vol. 1. Grand Rapids: Baker.
- Schaff, Phillip; Herzog, Jakob (1953). "Gomarus (Gomar), Franciscus". The New Schaff-Herzog Encyclopedia of Religious Knowledge. Vol. 5. Grand Rapids: Baker.
- Sierhuis, Freya (2015). The Literature of the Arminian Controversy. Oxford: Oxford University Press. p. 36.
- Stanglin, Keith D. (2007). Arminius on the Assurance of Salvation: The Context, Roots, and Shape of the Leiden Debate, 1603–1609. Brill. ISBN 978-90-04-15608-1.
- Stanglin, Keith D.; McCall, Thomas H. (2021). After Arminius: A Historical Introduction to Arminian Theology. New York: Oxford University Press.
- Pinson, J. Matthew (2003). "Will the Real Arminius Please Stand Up? A Study of the Theology of Jacobus Arminius in Light of His Interpreters" (PDF). Integrity: A Journal of Christian Thought. 2: 121–139.
- Witt, William Gene (1993). Creation, redemption and grace in the theology of Jacob Arminius (PhD). University of Notre Dame.

Academic offices
Preceded by Franciscus Junius	Chair of Theology at the University of Leiden; 1603–1609	Succeeded by Conrad Vorstius
