= Synod of Dort =

International Synod held in Dordrecht in 1618–1619, by the Dutch Reformed Church

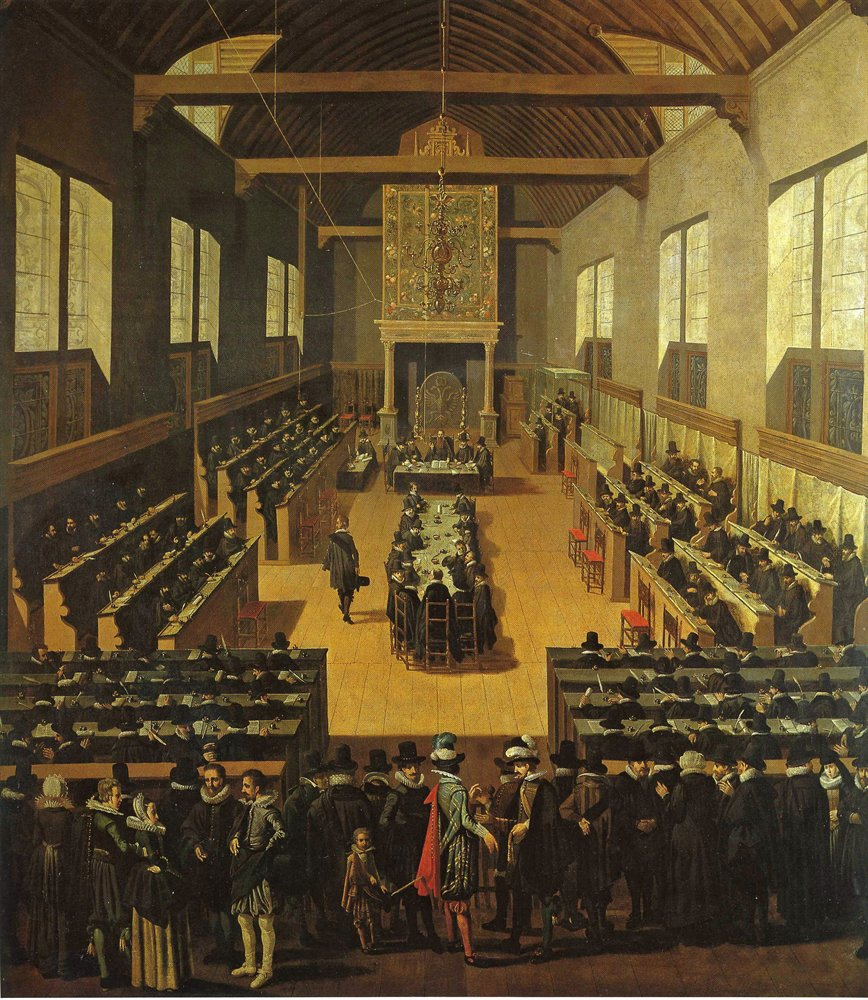
The Synod of Dort. The Arminians are seated at the table in the middle.

The Synod of Dort (also known as the Synod of Dordt or the Synod of Dordrecht) was a European transnational Synod held in Dordrecht in 1618–1619, by the Dutch Reformed Church, to settle a divisive controversy caused by the rise of Arminianism. The first meeting was on 13 November 1618 and the final meeting, the 154th, was on 9 May 1619. Voting representatives from eight foreign Reformed churches were also invited. Dort was a contemporary Dutch term for the town of Dordrecht (and it remains the local colloquial pronunciation).

The Synod is best known for approving the Canons of Dort. In 2014, the first entire critical edition of the Acts and Documents of the Synod was published.

== Background ==
There had been previous provincial synods of Dort, and a National Synod in 1578. For that reason the 1618 meeting is sometimes called the Second Synod of Dort.

The acts of the Synod were tied to political intrigues that arose during the Twelve Years' Truce, a pause in the Dutch war with Spain. After the death of Jacobus Arminius his followers presented objections to the Belgic Confession and the teaching of John Calvin, Theodore Beza, and their followers. These objections were published in a document called The Remonstrance of 1610, and the Arminians were therefore also known as Remonstrants. They taught conditional election on the basis of foreseen faith, unlimited atonement, resistible grace, and the possibility of lapse from grace. The opposing Calvinists or Gomarists, led by Franciscus Gomarus of the University of Leiden, became known as the Contra-Remonstrants.

The Arminians were accused of propagating false doctrine and perceived as ready to compromise with the Spanish, whereas the Dutch Calvinists were not, so Arminianism was considered by some to be not only theologically unsound but also political treason; in 1617–1618 there was a pamphlet war and Francis van Aarssens expressed the view that the Arminians were working for Philip IV of Spain. Planning for a National Synod was begun by Adriaan Pauw in March 1618. Before that, there had been a debate as to whether the synod should be national, as the Contra-Remonstrants wished, or provincial for Holland, as the Remonstrants argued. This decision was worked out in 1617, with outside input from the English ambassador Dudley Carleton.

== Purpose ==
The purpose of the Synod was to settle the controversy over Arminianism. It was subsequently alleged, but never proven, that the outcome had already been decided. According to Frederick Calder, "condemnation [of the Remonstrant doctrines] was determined before the national synod met." On the other hand, beyond the condemnation of the Arminians, the theological formulations of the Canons of the Synod by no means gave support to all the Gomarists wanted. In fact, Johannes Bogerman, president of the synod, himself a Supralapsarian, argued for the inclusion of the Infralapsarian position in the Canons. The more extreme views of Dutch Calvinists were moderated in the detailed debates.

== Delegates ==
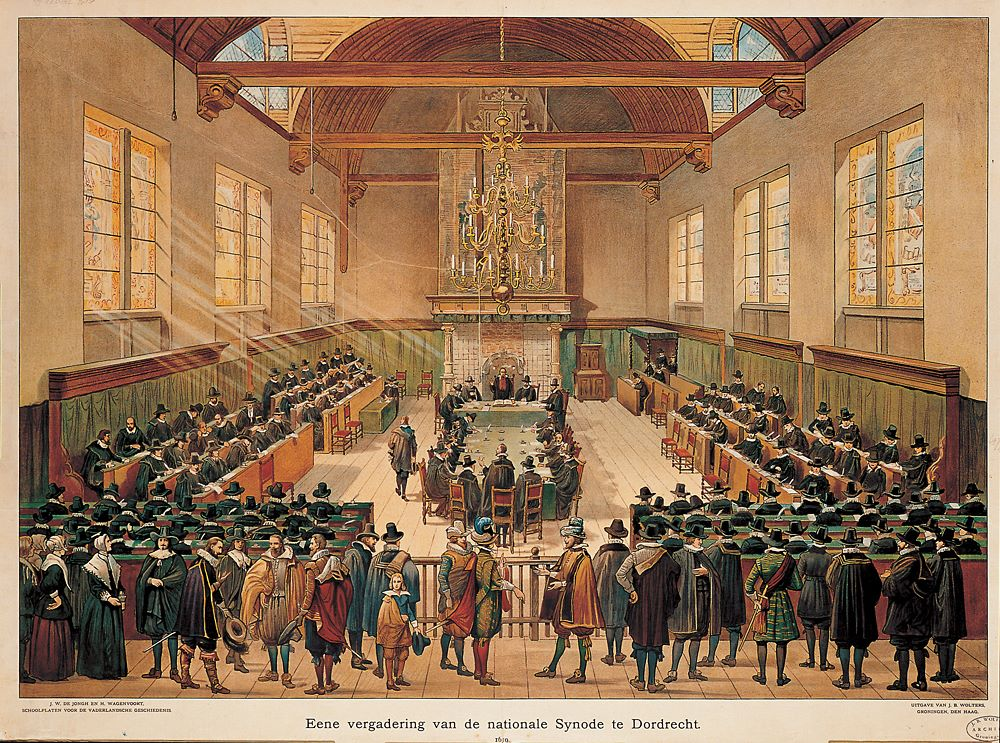
The Synod of Dort

The Synod had 27 members representing Reformed groups from continental Europe, as well as from the British Isles. Represented at the Synod were the Church of Scotland, the Swiss Reformed churches of Basel, Bern, Geneva, Schaffhausen and Zürich, and the German churches of Bremen, Hesse-Kassel, Nassau and the Palatinate. Among these groups were also Anglican delegates from the Church of England.

== Proceedings ==
Simon Episcopius (1583–1643) was spokesman of the 14 Remonstrants who were summoned before the Synod in 1618. At the opening of the synod, Episcopius asked to speak.

Episcopius ... insisted on being permitted to begin with a refutation of the Calvinistic doctrines, especially that of reprobation, hoping that, by placing his objections to this doctrine in front of all the rest, he might excite such prejudice against the other articles of the system, as to secure the popular voice in his favor. The Synod, however, very properly, reminded him ... that, as the Remonstrants were accused of departing from the Reformed faith, they were bound first to justify themselves, by giving Scriptural proof in support of their opinions. The Arminians would not submit to this plan of procedure because it destroyed their whole scheme of argument ... and were thus compelled to withdraw. Upon their departure, the Synod proceeded without them.

He concluded by expressing his dissatisfaction with the organization of the assembly, and that the Contra-Remonstrants had prevented an accurate representation of the Arminian supporters in the Dutch Reformed Church with votes in the synod. A delegation of Episcopius consisting of Bernard Arentsz Dwinglo (1582–1652) and Johannes Arnoldi Corvinus called on the Church of England representatives, and others coming from outside, asking for support and giving written accounts of the context. After that a month was spent on procedural matters concerning the Remonstrants. They were finally ejected from the Synod at session 57 on 14 January.

== The Canons of Dort ==
The Synod concluded with a rejection of the Arminian views, and set forth the Reformed doctrine on each point, namely: total depravity, unconditional election, limited atonement (arguing that Christ's atoning work was intended only for the elect and not for the rest of the world), irresistible (or irrevocable) grace, and the perseverance of the saints. These are sometimes referred to as the Five points of Calvinism. The nomenclature did not imply that all of Calvinism could be reduced to a mere five points, but that TULIP—the acronym that was later developed for the teachings of Dort in the English-speaking world—summarized the Calvinist position regarding the doctrine of the Sovereignty of God in salvation. The Decision of the Synod of Dort on the Five Main Points of Doctrine in Dispute in the Netherlands, popularly known as the Canons of Dort, is the explanation of the judicial decision of the Synod. In the original preface, the Decision is called:

a judgment, in which both, the true view agreeing with God's word concerning the aforesaid five points of doctrine is explained and, the false view disagreeing with God's Word is rejected.

== Aftermath ==
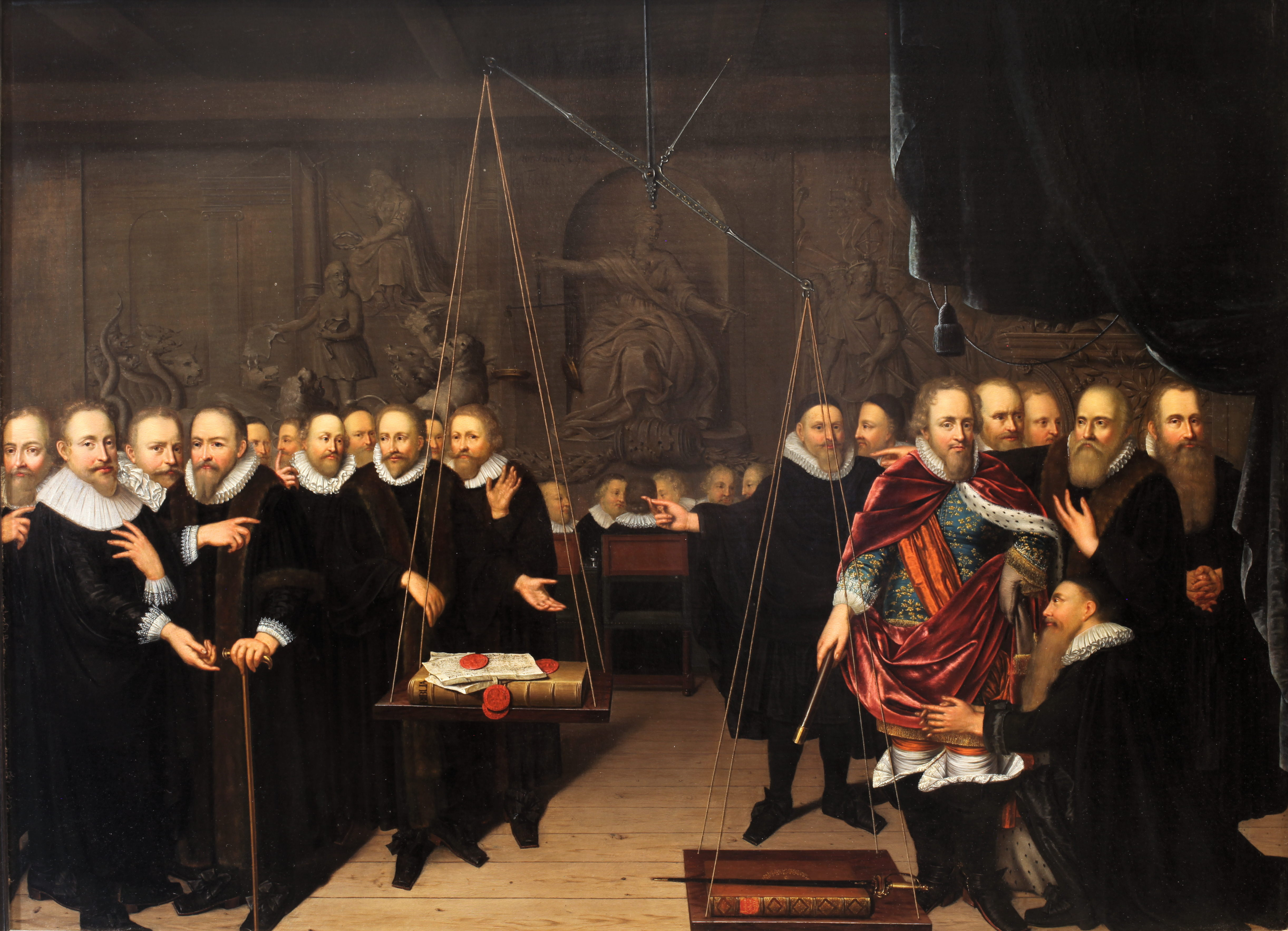
Allegory of the theological dispute between the Arminianists and their opponents by Abraham van der Eyk (1721), allegorically represents what many Arminians thought about the Synod: the Bible on the Arminian side was outweighed by the sword, representing the power of the state, and Calvin's Institutes on the other

The thirteen Remonstrant ministers, including Episcopius, had been charged to remain in Dort until further instruction. On 20 May 1619 the Remonstrant ministers who had been present were summoned by the lay-commissioners of the synod and directed to abstain from ministerial activities such as preaching, exhorting, administering the sacraments, and visiting the sick. Furthermore, Episcopius was commanded not to write letters or books promoting the doctrines of the Remonstrants. The Remonstrants agreed to refrain from ministering in the government-ordained churches, but confessed their duty to expound their doctrines wherever people would assemble to hear them.

On 5 July they were called to the States-General assembly where they were requested to sign The Act of Cessation, the legalization of the order to desist from the ministry. When they refused to sign it, they were sentenced as "disturbers of the public peace" and ordered to leave the United Provinces. However, in the 18th century, Arminian theology spread to England where it became integral to the theology of the Methodist churches.

== Bible translation ==
The synod also initiated an official Dutch Bible translation (the Statenvertaling, i.e. Translation of the States or, the Dutch Authorized Version) from the original languages that would be completed in 1637. Translators were appointed, and the States-General were asked to fund the project. It had a lasting impact on the standard Dutch language, which was just then beginning to gain wider acceptance and developing a literary tradition. It would remain the standard translation in Protestant churches for more than three centuries and still is used in some sister churches of the Netherlands Reformed Congregations and similar, smaller denominations.

Like its sister translations, the Geneva Bible and the King James Version (Authorized Version), the Dutch pastor-scholars worked in the Old Testament from the Masoretic Text (consulting the Septuagint) and in the New Testament from the Textus Receptus (consulting the Majority Text).

In 1645, the Westminster Assembly appointed Theodore Haak to translate the Statenvertaling met kanttekeningen (The Dort Bible and its Commentary) into English for wider distribution. This work was published by Henry Hill in London 1657.

== Political impact ==
The Synod rejected the teachings of the Remonstrants on the controverted points as falling outside the bounds of the Reformed confessions. There followed the political condemnation of the statesman Johan van Oldenbarnevelt who had been the protector of the Remonstrants. For the crime of general perturbation in the state of the nation, both in Church and State (treason), he was beheaded on 13 May 1619, only four days after the final meeting of the Synod. As consequence of the Arminian defeat, the jurist Hugo Grotius was given a life sentence in prison; but he escaped with the help of his wife. Both Van Oldenbarnevelt and Grotius had in fact been imprisoned since 29 August 1618.

== See also ==
- History of the Netherlands
