= Counter Remonstrance of 1611 =

The Counter-Remonstrance of 1611 was the Dutch Reformed Churches' response to the controversial Remonstrants' Five Articles of Remonstrance, which challenged the Calvinist theology and the Reformed Confessions that the Remonstrants had sworn to uphold. The Counter-Remonstrance was written primarily by Festus Hommius and defended the Belgic Confession against theological criticisms from the followers of the late Jacob Arminius, although Arminius himself claimed adherence to the Belgic Confession and Heidelberg Catechism till his death. Prior to the Canons of Dort, the Counter-Remonstrance of 1611 was the earliest and clearest representation of what is in modern times commonly referred to as the "five points of Calvinism."

== History ==
Dutch theologian James Arminius (1560–1609) died without much fanfare in 1609. He left behind a mixed legacy - a brilliantly gifted scholar whose career was marred with accusations that he had departed from the standard Calvinist interpretation of Romans 9, among other passages. Despite some strong criticism from some of his peers, Arminius insisted that he held the doctrines outlined in the Belgic Confession and Heidelberg Catechism until his death. If was after his death that a controversy erupted in 1610, when a critical document (called a Remonstance) from forty-three of his like-minded colleagues appeared, declaring themselves "the Remonstrants."

James T. Dennison summarized the events, "On March 10, 1611, at The Hague, the famous Collatio Hagensis (Conference of the Hague) convened with six members of the Remonstrant party and six members of the opposition. Festus Hommius (1576–1642), pastor at Leiden, delivered his answer to the 1610 affirmation in 'counter-remonstrance.'"

== The Counter-Remonstrance's Seven Points of Doctrine ==
The Remonstrants' Five Articles of Remonstrance was met with a response written primarily by Festus Hommius, called The Counter-Remonstrance of 1611. The Counter-Remonstrance of 1611 defended the Belgic Confession against theological criticisms from the followers of late Jacob Arminius, although Arminius himself claimed adherence to the Belgic Confession and Heidelberg Catechism till his death.

1. As in Adam the whole human race, created in the image of God, has with Adam fallen into sin and thus become so corrupt that all men are conceived and born in sin and thus are by nature children of wrath, lying dead in their trespasses so that there is within them no more power to convert themselves truly unto God and to believe in Christ than a corpse has power to raise itself from the dead; so God draws out of this condemnation and delivers a certain number of men who in his eternal and immutable counsel He has chosen out of mere grace, according to the good pleasure of his will, unto salvation in Christ, passing by the others in his just judgment and leaving them in their sins.

2. that not only adults who believe in Christ and accordingly walk worthy of the gospel are to be reckoned as God's elect children, but also the children of the covenant so long as they do not in their conduct manifest the contrary; and that therefore believing parents, when their children die in infancy, have no reason to doubt the salvation of these their children.

3. that God in his election has not looked to the faith or conversion of his elect, nor to the right use of his gifts, as the grounds of election; but that on the contrary He in his eternal and immutable counsel has purposed and decreed to bestow faith and perseverance in godliness and thus to save those whom He according to his good pleasure has chosen to salvation.

4. that to this end He has first of all presented and given to them his only-begotten Son Jesus Christ, whom He delivered up to the death of the cross in order to save his elect, so that, although the suffering of Christ as that of the only-begotten and unique Son of God is sufficient unto the atonement of the sins of all men, nevertheless the same, according to the counsel and decree of God, has its efficacy unto reconciliation and forgiveness of sins only in the elect and true believer.

5. that furthermore to the same end God the Lord has his holy gospel preached, and that the Holy Spirit externally through the preaching of that same gospel and internally through a special grace works so powerfully in the hearts of God's elect, that He illumines their minds, transforms and renews their wills, removing the heart of stone and giving them a heart of flesh, in such a manner that by these means they not only receive power to convert themselves and believe but also actually and willingly do repent and believe.

6. that those whom God has decreed to save are not only once so enlightened, regenerated and renewed in order to believe in Christ and convert themselves to God, but that they by the same power of the Holy Spirit by which they were converted to God without any contribution of themselves are in like manner continually supported and preserved; so that, although many weaknesses of the flesh cleave to them as long as they are in this life and are engaged in a continual struggle between flesh and Spirit and also sometimes fall into grievous sins, nevertheless this same Spirit prevails in this struggle, not permitting that God's elect by the corruption of the flesh should so resist the Spirit of sanctification that this would at any time be extinguished in them, and that in consequence they could completely or finally lose the true faith which was once bestowed on them and the Spirit of adoption as God's children which they had once received.

7. that nevertheless the true believers find no excuse in this teaching to pursue carelessly the lusts of the flesh, since it is impossible that those who by a true faith are ingrafted into Christ should not produce the fruits of thankfulness; but on the contrary the more they assure themselves and feel that God works in them both to will and to do according to this good pleasure, the more they persist in working their own salvation with fear and trembling, since they know that this is the only means by which it pleases God to keep them standing and to bring them to salvation. For this reason He also employs in his Word all manner of warnings and threatenings, not in order to cause them to despair or doubt their salvation but rather to awaken in them a childlike fear by observing the weakness of their flesh in which they would surely perish, unless the Lord keep them standing in his undeserved grace, which is the sole cause and ground of their perseverance; so that, although He warns them in his Word to watch and pray, they nevertheless do not have this of themselves that they desire God's help and lack nothing, but only from the same Spirit who by a special grace prepares them for this and thus also powerfully keeps them standing.

== Relationship to the TULIP acronym ==
=== Point 1 ===
The doctrine of Total depravity is covered under point 1. This doctrine states that Adam's fall into sin led to the condemnation of the whole human race. Since the time of Adam's fall into sin, now "all men are conceived and born in sin and thus are by nature children of wrath, lying dead in their trespasses so that there is within them no more power to convert themselves truly unto God and to believe in Christ than a corpse has power to raise itself from the dead."

Point 1 also covered the doctrine of Unconditional election, which states that from eternity, God, out of a common mass of condemned men, chose and elected a certain specific individuals, referred to in the Bible as "the elect" (Matthew 24:22, 24, and 31, etc.). God determined according to the good pleasure of his will to choose out of mere grace, these "elect" individuals and bring them to salvation within historical time. God also determined to pass by the rest of condemned mankind, leaving them in their sins, and submitting these to his just and righteous judgment.

=== Point 2 ===
The doctrine of unconditional election is further covered under point 2 of the Counter-Remonstrance. This point states that God's "elect children" include both adults and the children of the covenant; "therefore believing parents, when their children die in infancy, have no reason to doubt the salvation of these their children."

=== Point 3 ===
Point 3 also covers the doctrine of unconditional election, in its firm rejection of the Remonstrance's claim that God's election was based on His looking into the future to see which sinful men would choose God. Point 3 states that "God in his election has not looked to the faith or conversion of his elect, nor to the right use of his gifts, as the grounds of election; but that on the contrary He in his eternal and immutable counsel has purposed and decreed to bestow faith and perseverance in godliness and thus to save those whom He according to his good pleasure has chosen to salvation."

=== Point 4 ===
The doctrine of Limited Atonement is defended in point 4, which declared that Christ was delivered to the cross in order to save only His elect, and not all of mankind. The Remonstrance's claim that Christ died for each and every individual is refuted.

=== Point 5 ===
The doctrine of Irresistible Grace is outlined in point 5 where it is taught that the Holy Spirit uses the gospel preached broadly to many men to call and draw only God's elect. The Spirit "illumines their minds, transforms and renews their wills, removing the heart of stone and giving them a heart of flesh, in such a manner that by these means they not only receive power to convert themselves and believe but also actually and willingly do repent and believe."

=== Point 6 ===
The doctrine of the Perseverance of the Saints is taught in point 6.

=== Point 7 ===
The doctrine of the Perseverance of the Saints is taught in point 7.

== See also ==
- Franciscus Gomarus

== Sources ==
- De Jong, Peter (1968). "The Opinions of the Remonstrants (1618)". Crisis in the Reformed Churches: Essays in Commemoration of the Great Synod of Dordt, 1618-1619 (PDF). Grand Rapids: Reformed Fellowship.
