= Franciscus Gomarus =

Dutch Calvinist theologian (1563–1641)

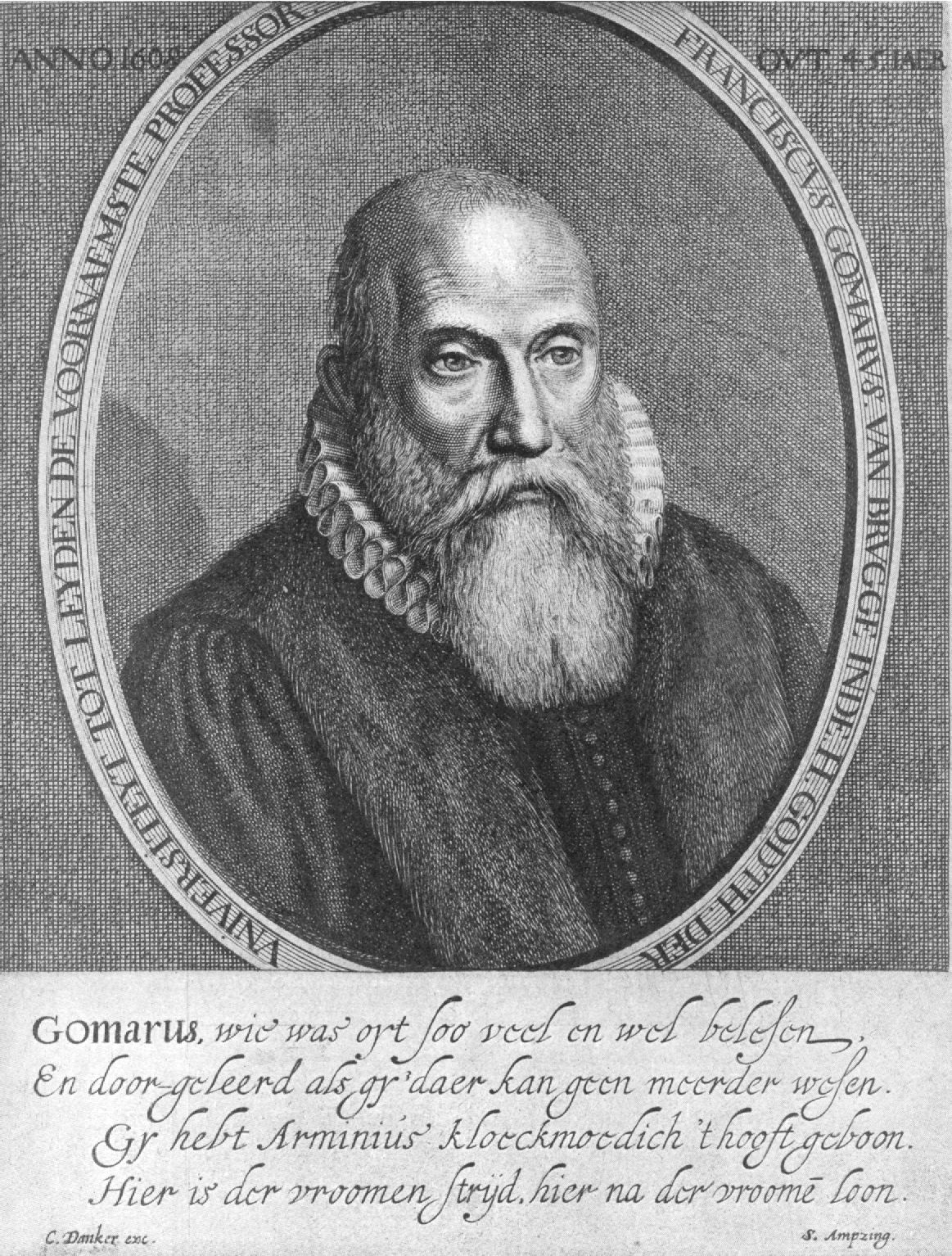
- Born: François Gomaer; 30 January 1563; Bruges, Habsburg Netherlands
- Died: 11 January 1641 (aged 77); Groningen, Dutch Republic

Franciscus Gomarus (François Gomaer; 30 January 1563 – 11 January 1641) was a Dutch theologian, a strict Calvinist and an opponent of the teaching of Jacobus Arminius (and his followers), whose theological disputes were addressed at the Synod of Dort (or Dordrecht) (1618–19).

== Life ==
Gomarus was born in Bruges. His parents, having embraced the principles of the Reformation, emigrated from Bruges to the Electorate of the Palatinate in 1578, in order to enjoy freedom to profess their new faith, and they sent their son to be educated at Strasbourg under Johann Sturm. He remained there three years, and then went in 1580 to Neustadt, from which the professors of Heidelberg had been driven by the elector-palatine because they were not Lutherans. Here his teachers in theology were Zacharius Ursinus (1534–83), Hieronymus Zanchius (1560–90), and Daniel Tossanus (1541–1602). Crossing to England towards the end of 1582, he attended the lectures of John Rainolds (1549–1607) at Oxford, and those of William Whitaker at Cambridge. He graduated from Cambridge in 1584, and then went to Heidelberg, where the faculty had been re-established by this time. He was pastor of a Dutch Reformed Church in Frankfurt from 1587 until 1593, when the congregation was dispersed by persecution. In 1594 he was appointed professor of theology at the University of Leiden, and before going there received the degree of doctor from the University of Heidelberg.

== Theology ==
Gomarus taught quietly at Leiden until 1603, when Jacobus Arminius came to be one of his colleagues in the theological faculty, and began to teach what Gomarus viewed as essentially Pelagian doctrines and to create a new school of theology within the university. Gomarus immediately set himself earnestly to oppose these beliefs in his classes at college, and was supported by Johann B. Bogermann (1570–1637), who afterwards became professor of theology at Franeker. Arminius sought to make election dependent upon faith, whilst they sought to enforce absolute predestination as the rule of faith, according to which the whole Scriptures are to be interpreted. Gomarus then became the leader of the opponents of Arminius, who came to be known as Gomarists (Dutch: contra-remonstranten).

He engaged twice in personal disputation with Arminius in the assembly of the States of Holland in 1608, and was one of five Gomarists who met five Remonstrants (Arminians) in the same assembly of 1609. On the death of Arminius shortly after this time, Konrad Vorstius, who sympathized with Arminius's views, was appointed to succeed him, in spite of the opposition of Gomarus and his friends. Gomarus took this defeat badly, resigned his post, and went to Middelburg in 1611, where he became preacher at the Reformed church, and taught theology and Hebrew in the newly founded Illustre Schule.

He was then called in 1614 to a chair of theology at the Academy of Saumur, where he remained four years, and then accepted a call as professor of theology and Hebrew at Groningen, where he stayed until his death in Groningen on 11 January 1641. Gomarus, despite his position as a professor of Hebrew, urged that restrictions be placed on the Jews.

== Synod of Dort ==
Gomarus took a leading part in the Synod of Dort (or Dordrecht), assembled in 1618 to judge of the doctrines of Arminius. He was a man of ability, enthusiasm and learning, a considerable Oriental scholar, and also a keen controversialist. He took part in revising the Dutch translation of the Old Testament in 1633. After his death, the Lyra Davidis was published, in which he sought to explain the meter of Biblical Hebrew poetry, and which created some controversy at the time, having been opposed by Louis Cappel. His works were collected and published in a one volume folio, in Amsterdam in 1645. He was succeeded at Groningen in 1643 by his pupil Samuel Maresius (1599–1673).
