= List of participants in the Synod of Dort =

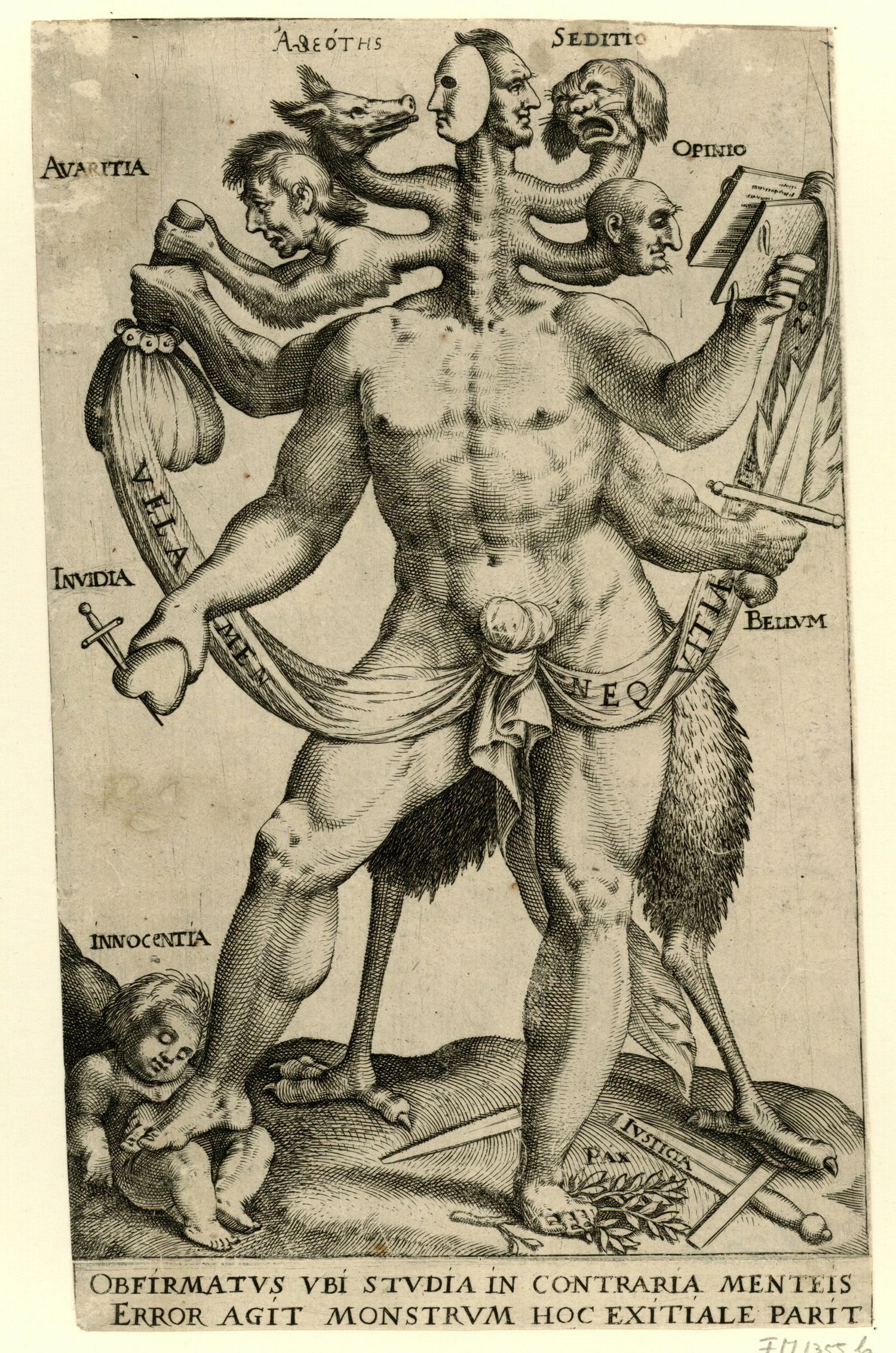
Arminianism as a five-headed monster, 1618 engraving.

Official participation in the Synod of Dort, held in 1618–9 in Dordrecht in the Netherlands, consisted of different groups: Dutch ministers, church elders, and theologians; representatives of churches outside the Dutch Republic; and Dutch lay politicians. There were 14 Remonstrants who were summoned, in effect as defendants. There were also some observers, who had no voting status. Listings are usually given according to a traditional ordering for the provinces that begins with Gelderland; for the provincial synods Holland was divided into two, North and South. In the sources both Latinised names and spelling variants occur. Lists of those nominated to participate in some capacity differ from those who signed the final Acts of the Synod. Figures vary a little, but one total given is for 102 official participants. The outcome of the Synod was the most significant single event in the Calvinist-Arminian debate.

The Dutch members of the Synod were divided up by provincial synods (for the clerics and elders as delegates), or by provinces (for the lay members). Allowing for Holland as exception, the delegates were divided into ten "colleges": one for each of seven provinces, plus Drenthe; one for theological faculties; and one for the Walloon churches.

== Dutch delegates ==
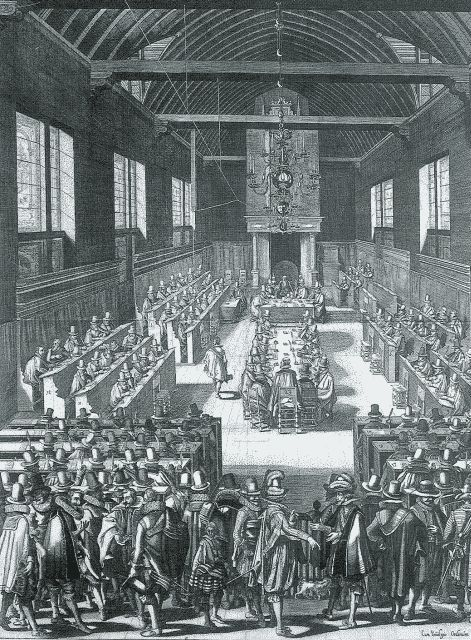
Synod of Dordrecht, 1729 engraving by Bernard Picart.

=== Dutch theologians ===
Name	Institution	Comments
Johannes Polyander	University of Leiden	Editor of the canons.
Franciscus Gomarus	University of Groningen	
Antonius Thysius	University of Harderwijk	
Antonius Walaeus	Middelburg Latin school	
Sibrandus Lubbertus	University of Franeker	His attendance was delayed.

=== Delegates from Dutch provincial synods ===
Name	Province	Comments
Gulielmus Stephani	Gelderland	Pastor from Arnhem.
Ellardus a Mehen, Eilardus van Mehen (Moenius) (1570 – c. 1639)	Gelderland	Pastor from Harderwijk.
Johannes Bouillet	Gelderland	From Warnsveld, signatory.
Sebastian Damman (1578 or 1580–1640)	Gelderland	Secretary to the Synod, and minister from Zutphen.
Jacobus Verheyden (Verheiden) Graviensis (fl. 1590)	Gelderland	Elder from Nijmegen; brother of Willem Verheiden.
Henricus van Hel	Gelderland	Elder of Zutphen
Festus Hommius	South Holland	Scribe.
Gisbertus Voetius	South Holland	Minister of Heusden
Balthasar Lydius	South Holland	Pastor in Dort
Henricus Arnoldi	South Holland	Preacher at Delft
Arnoldus Musius (Arnoldus Muys van Holij)	South Holland	Elder of the Church of Dort
Joannes de Laet (Johannes Latius)	South Holland	Elder of the Church of Leyden
Jacobus Triglandius	North Holland	Minister of the Church of Amsterdam
Jacobus Rolandus	North Holland	Minister of the Church of Amsterdam
Abrahamus à Dooreslaer	North Holland	Minister of the Church of Enkhuizen
Samuel Bartholdus	North Holland	Pastor of Monnickendam
Theodorus Heyngius (Dirk Heinsius)	North Holland	Elder of the Church of Amsterdam
Dominicus van Heemskerc	North Holland	Elder of Amsterdam
Godefridus Corneliszoon Udemans (Godefridus Udemannus)	Zeeland	Pastor of Zierikzee
Hermannus Faukelius	Zeeland	Assessor.
Cornelius Regius	Zeeland	Pastor of Tergoose
Lambertus de Ryck	Zeeland	Pastor of Bergen up Zoon
Josias Vosbergius	Zeeland	Elder of the Church of Middelburg
Adrianus Hofferus	Zeeland	Elder of the Church of Zierikzee
Johannes Dibbets (Dibbetzius)	Utrecht (the province was split between Remonstrants and Contra-Remonstrants)	Minister of Dordrecht, delegate for the provincial synod of Utrecht; Counter-Remonstrant position.
Arnoldus Oortcampius	Utrecht	Minister of Amersfoort; Counter-Remonstrant position.
Lambertus Canterus	Utrecht	Elder of Utrecht; Counter-Remonstrant position.
Isaacus Frederici	Utrecht	Minister of Utrecht; Remonstrant position.
Samuel Naeranus	Utrecht	Minister of Amersfoort; Remonstrant position.
Stephanus van Helsdingen	Utrecht	Elder of Utrecht; Remonstrant position.
Johannes Bogerman	Friesland	Chairman.
Florentius Johannes	Friesland	Church of Sneek
Philippus Danielis Eilshemius	Friesland	Pastor of Harlingen
Kempo Harinxma à Donia	Friesland (NB different lists are not compatible for this province, when it comes to the elders; one of those subscribing to the Canons did not present credentials initially).	Elder of Leeuwarden. Subscriber.
Meinardus ab Idzerda	Friesland	Elder of Leeuwarden. Not a subscriber.
Johannes vander Sande	Friesland	Elder of Leeuwarden. Not a subscriber.
Tacitus ab Aysma	Friesland	Elder of the Churches of Buirgirt, Hichtum, and Hartwardt, Subscriber.
Casparus Sibelius	Overijssel	Pastor at Deventer
Hermannus Wiferding	Overijssel	Minister at Swoll.
Hieronymus Vogelius	Overijssel	Pastor at Hasselt.
Iohannes Langius	Overijssel	Preacher at Vollenhove.
Wilhelmus à Broickhuysenten Doerne	Overijssel	Elder.
Johannes à Lauwick	Overijssel	Elder.
Cornelius (Cornelis) Hillenius	Groningen	Minister of Groningen
Georgius Placius	Groningen	Minister of Appingedam
Wolfgangus Agricola	Groningen	Minister of Bedum
Johannes Lolingius	Groningen	Minister of Noordbroek
Egbertus Halbes	Groningen	Elder of Groningen
Johannes Ruffelaert	Groningen	Elder of Stedum
Themo ab Asscheberg	Drenthe	Pastor of Meppelen
Patroclus Romelingius	Drenthe	Pastor of Rhvine
Daniel Colonius	Walloon churches	Minister of Leiden
Johannes de la Croix	Walloon churches	Minister of Haarlem
Johannes Doucher	Walloon churches	Minister of Vlissingen
Jeremias de Pours	Walloon churches	Minister of Middelburg
Everardus Becker	Walloon churches	Elder of Middelburg
Petrus du Pont	Walloon churches	Elder of Amsterdam

== Dutch lay commissioners ==
- Jacob de Witt (treasurer)

The commissioners by province were:

- Gelderland and Zutphen: Martinus Gregorius, Hendrik van Essen.
- Holland and West Friesland: Walrave de Brederode, Hugo Muys van Holy, Jacobus Boelens, Gerardus van Nieuburg, Rochus van Honaert, Nicholaas Krombout.
- Zealand: Symon Scotte, Jacobus van Kampe.
- Utrecht: Frederik van Zuylen, van Nieuveld, Willem Herteveld.
- Friesland: Ernestus van Aylva, Ernestus ad Harinksma.
- Overijssel: Hendrik van Haagen, Johannes van Hemerde.
- Groningen: Hieronimus Ysbrants, Efaart Jacob Clant, Daniel Heinsius.

Of these Gregorius, van Honaert, Krombout, and Ysbrands were doctors of both laws. The list of commissioners later signing the Acts of the Synod is somewhat different.

== Remonstrants ==
A number of prominent Remonstrant ministers were cited to appear before the Synod, around 10% of the 200 identified Remonstrants at that time in the Dutch Reformed Church. Of those, a number were deprived of their church posts before the proceedings, which formed the latter part of the political and religious struggle that had been triggered in 1618, and which came to a head after the Synod closed. Only three Remonstrants were among the delegates (from Utrecht, two ministers and a church elder). Simon Episcopius emerged as leader of the group of Remonstrants who were summoned. His efforts to secure participation in the debates of the Synod for the group failed after extensive procedural discussion; the summoned Remonstrants were, however, required to remain in Dordrecht. With one exception they refused to subscribe to the required declaration at the end of the Synod, were expelled from the Church, and banished. In total around 70 Remonstrant ministers were banished in the aftermath of the Synod.

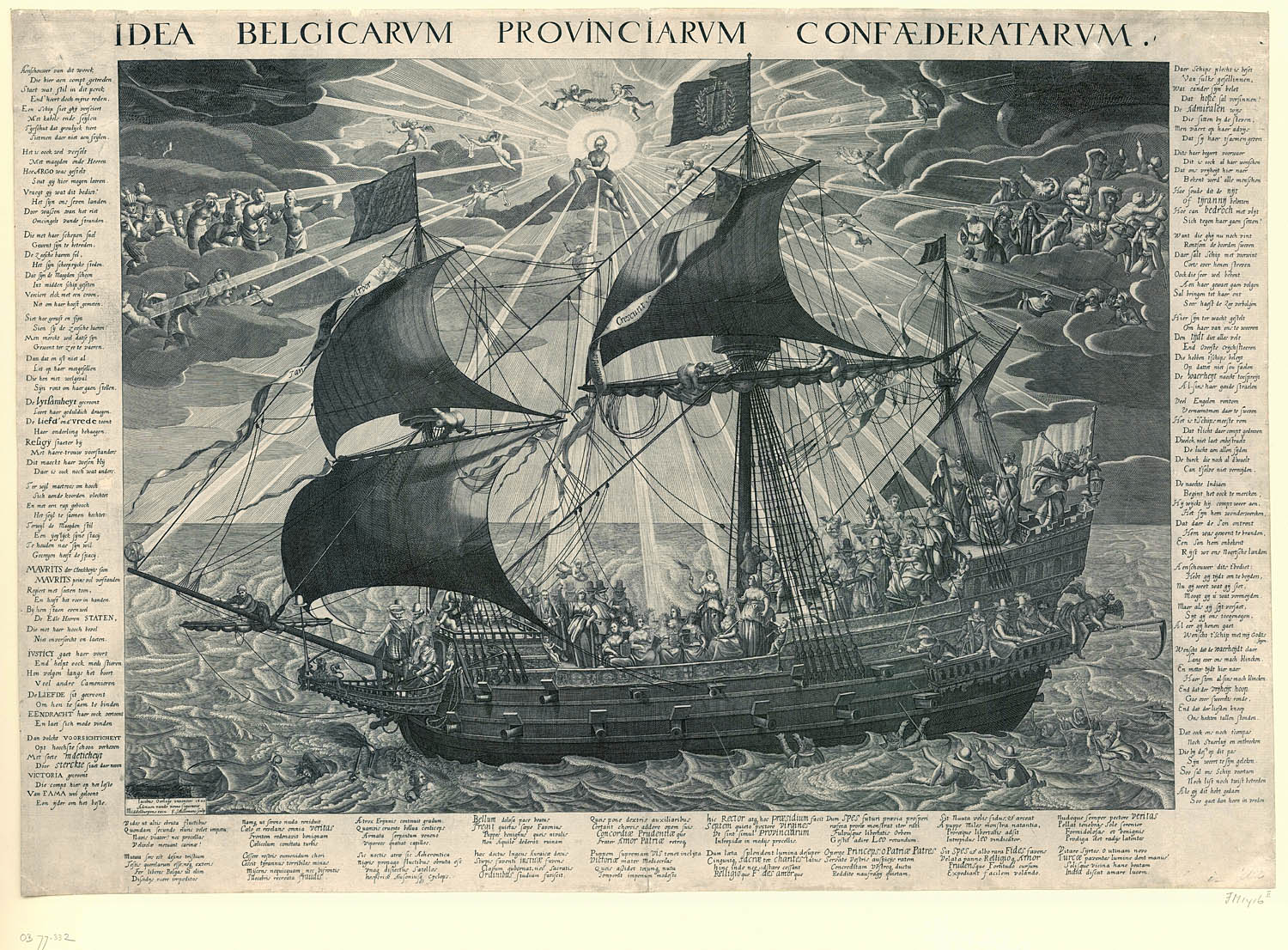
Allegorical engraving of the Dutch Republic as a ship from 1620, with the Stadtholder Maurice at the helm.

The 14 Remonstrants banished by the Synod were:

- Gelderland: Bernerus Wezekius, Henricus Hollingerus.
- South Holland: Simon Episcopius, Iohannes Arnoldi Corvinus, Bernardus Dwinglonius, Eduardus Popius, Theophilus Rickwaerdius.
- North Holland: Phillippus Pinakerus, Dominicus Sapma.
- Utrecht: Isaacus Frederici, Samuel Neranus.
- Overijssel: Thomas Goswinus, Assuerus Mathisius.
- Walloon churches: Carolus Niellius.

(These are the Latinised names as given, correcting two spellings.) Apart from the Utrecht representative ministers who were Remonstrants–Frederici and Naeranus–these clergy were therefore not full participants in the Synod at any point.

A baseline list of 13 names in Historie der Remonstranten (1774) by Jacobus Regenboog is of those Remonstrants who were summoned (and omitting the delegates Frederici and Naeranus from the Utrecht provincial synod):

- Gelderland: Henricus Leo of Bommel, Vezekius of Egteld, Hollingerus of Grave.
- South Holland: Episcopius, Arnoldi and Dwinglo of Leiden, Poppius of Gouda, Rykewaard of Brielle.
- North Holland: Pynakker of Alkmaar, Sapma of Hoorn.
- Overijssel: Gozuinus and Mathisius of Kampen.
- Walloon churches: Niellius of Utrecht.

It was Henricus Leo who was the sole Remonstrant of these summoned who signed the Act of Cessation (acte van stilstand) as required by the Synod, and escaped banishment. His absence from the first list gives numbers that tally.

There is a longer listing in the works of John Hales of those Remonstrants who were cited by the Synod (21 names, but 20 if Joannes Arnoldi and Corvinus are duplicates); this list includes names of ministers who were by other means removed from their posts. The breakdown by provinces is:

- Gelderland: Leo, Wezekius, Holderingus.
- South Holland: Adrianus Bozzius, Nicolaus Grevinchovius, Episcopius, Arnoldi, Poppius, Rickwardus.
- North Holland: Joannes Geysteranus, Sapma.
- Overijssel: Goswinius, Mathisius.
- Walloon churches: Simon Goulartius, Niellius.
- Utrecht: Utenbogardus, Corvinus, Duinghonius, Pinakerus, Neranus, Friderici.

Goulartius (Simon Goulart the Younger of Geneva, 1575–1628) the Remonstrant was the son of Simon Goulart of Senlis (1543–1628). Though summoned he had already been dismissed from his post.

== Foreign representatives ==
There were 27 delegates who attended from outside the Dutch provinces. Two replacements were made during the Synod.

=== Great Britain ===
Name	Comment
George Carleton (1559–1628)	Bishop of Llandaff; he led the English delegation in objecting to article 31 of the Belgic Confession. Addressed as 'bishop' throughout the synod, and distinguished by his seat being provided with an episcopal canopy.
Joseph Hall (1574–1657)	Withdrew because of illness.
Thomas Goad (1576–1638)	Goad replaced Hall who became ill.
John Davenant (1576–1641)	
Samuel Ward (1572–1643)	
Walter Balcanqual (1586–1645)	Balcanqual was a priest of the Church of England, but officially was there as representative of the Church of Scotland.

=== Imperial delegates ===
There was some consideration given to invitations to clergy from Reformed churches in the German principalities and cities of the Empire, with a view to being selective and distinguishing among types of nominally Calvinist church. Invitations were issued to: the Palatinate, Brandenburg, Hesse-Kassel, Nassau, East Friesland, Hanau. Anhalt was excluded. John Sigismund, Elector of Brandenburg declined to send a delegation; the Calvinist–Lutheran relationship in Brandenburg was fragile, and a diplomatic excuse was made. It was later alleged that Anhalt was not invited, for fear that the delegation would be pro-Remonstrant.

Name	Principality/City	Comments
Abraham Scultetus (1566–1624)	Electorate of the Palatinate	
Paul Tossanus (1572–1634)	Palatinate	
Hendrik Alting (1583–1644)	Palatinate	
Georg Cruciger (1575–1637)	Hesse-Kassel	
Paul Stein (1585–1643)	Hesse-Kassel	
Rudolph Goclenius (1547–1628)	Hesse-Kassel	
Daniel Angelocrator (1569–1635).	Hesse-Kassel	
Johann Heinrich Alsted (1588–1638)	Nassau	
Johannes Bisterfeld the Elder (died in 1619)	Nassau	
Georg Fabricius	Nassau	
Ludwig Crocius (1586–1653)	Bremen	The Augsburg Confession was accepted in Bremen.
Matthias Martinius (1572–1630)	Bremen	
Heinrich Isselburg (1577–1628)	Bremen	
Ritzius Lucas Grimersheim (1568–1631)	Emden	
Daniël Bernard Eilshemius (1555–1622)	Emden	
Herman op den Graeff (1585–1642)	Krefeld	Mennonite
Giovanni Diodati (1576–1649)	Geneva	Geneva counted as an Imperial free city.
Théodore Tronchin (1582–1657)	Geneva	
Johann Jakob Breitinger (1575–1645)	Swiss cantons, Zurich	The Swiss territories nominally formed part of the Empire in the form of the Old Swiss Confederacy, until 1648.
Wolfgang Mayer (1577–1653)	Swiss cantons, Basel	
Sebastian Beck (Beckius) (1583–1654)	Swiss cantons, Basel	Theological faculty of the university.
Mark Rütimeyer (1580–1647)	Swiss cantons, Bern	
Hans Conrad Koch (Cochius) (1564–1643)	Swiss cantons, Schaffhausen	

=== France ===
From France: None because the French government prohibited their attendance. A set of empty chairs was set up in the assembly in honor of the absent French Huguenots. Four delegates had been chosen by the National Synod: Daniel Chamier, Jean Chauve, Pierre Du Moulin and André Rivet.

== Observers ==
Name	Nationality	Comments
John Hales	English	Present as chaplain to Sir Dudley Carleton. He wrote significant correspondence about the Synod, and reputedly decided against high Calvinist theology as a result of attendance, being particularly impressed with Martinius.
William Ames	English	Contra-Remonstrant activist.
John Brinsley the younger	England	Secretary to Joseph Hall.
Carolus Liebaert (1581–?)	Dutch	For the Dutch London congregation, whose representation had been supported by Festus Hommius.
Ludwig Lucius	Anhalt	Anhalt was not invited to send delegates. On the other hand Lucius attended at some point on behalf of its Prince.
