= Jacobus Taurinus =

Dutch preacher & theologian (1576-1618)

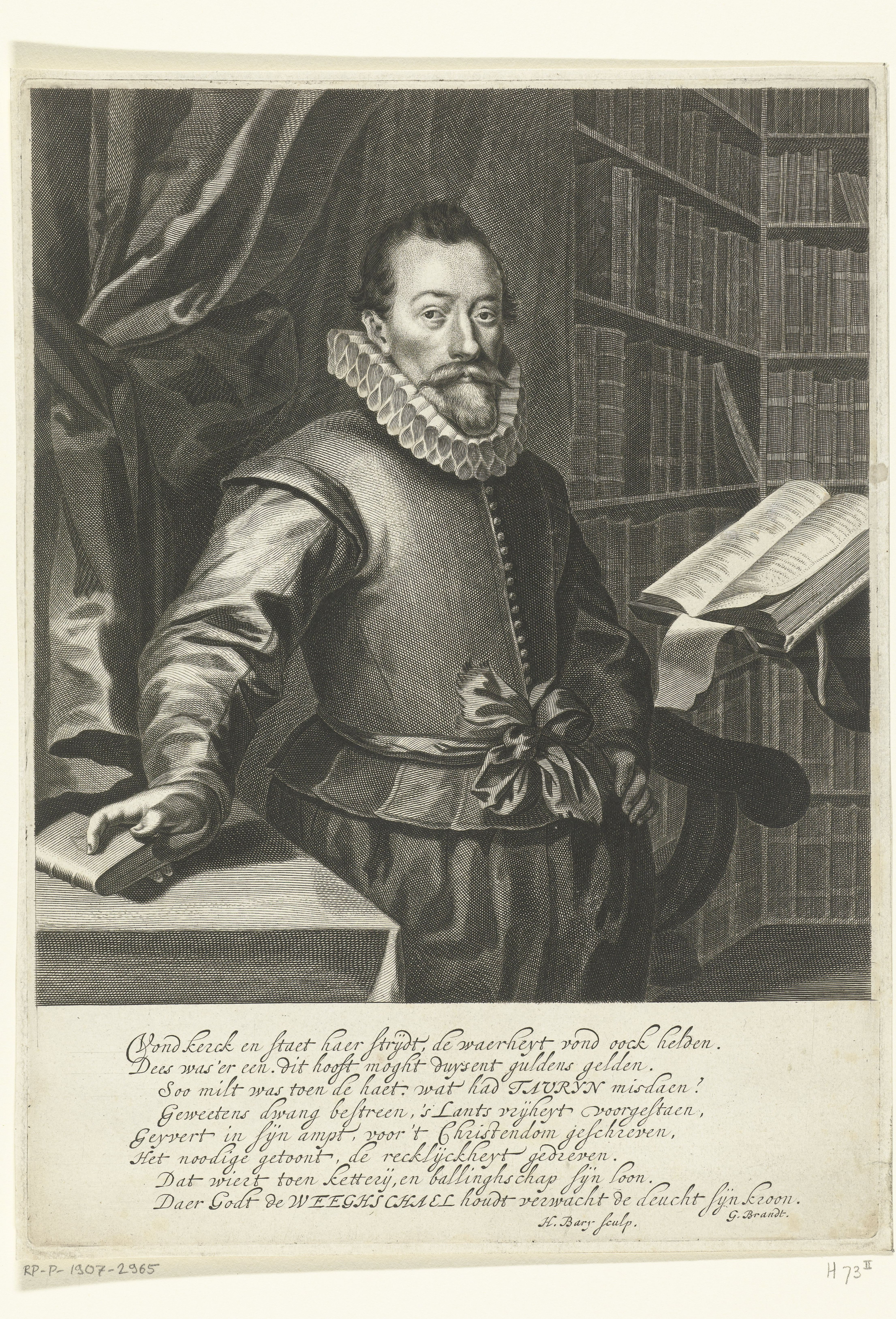
Portrait of Jacobus Taurinus

Jacobus Taurinus (Jacob van Toor) (1576 – 22 September 1618) was a Dutch preacher and theologian, a main supporter of the Remonstrants and polemical writer in their cause.

== Life ==
He was born in Schiedam, where his father Petrus Taurinus was a preacher of the Reformed Church. He studied theology at the University of Leiden from 14 November 1590, under Franciscus Junius the Elder, Lucas Trelcatius, Petrus Bertius and Franciscus Gomarus; and associated with Willem van Zyll, Karl Ryckewaert, Everardus Booth, Johann Narsius, Eduardus Poppius, and Simon Goulart the Younger.

In 1600 Taurinus took the post of lecturer in the ‘t Woud parish of Delft. In the following year he had a call to Delftshaven, and in 1605 to Utrecht. There he collaborated with Gilles van Ledenberg. In 1617 a polemical pamphlet involved Taurinus in serious political trouble, it having offended James I of England. The political changes of 1618, in which Maurice of Nassau took control, made him leave the Netherlands, and he died that year at Antwerp with Johannes Wtenbogaert.

== Works ==
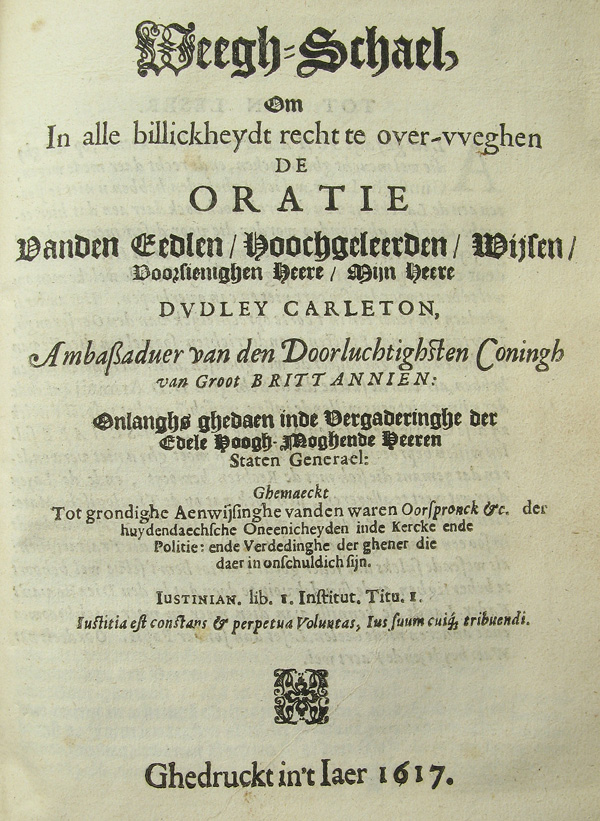
Title page of Weegh-Schael (1617), anonymous pamphlet by Jacobus Taurinus.

Sir Dudley Carleton, English ambassador in The Hague, made a speech against the Remonstrants to the States-General of the Netherlands (6 October 1617). Taurinus subjected this oration to criticism in the anonymous Weegh-schael (The Balance), after consulting Johan van Oldenbarneveldt. Carleton was taken to task for acting inconsistently with the wishes of his royal master. Carleton in November asked the States General on 22 November for the author to be punished; and was informed in December by Matthew Slade that the pamphlet had been written by Taurinus. Carleton pursued the matter vigorously, brought up several stringent demands, and made the French translation a target also. The French version was by Carolus Niellius, and included a satirical introduction.

Other works included Van de onderlinge Verdraagsammheydt: tegen Jacobi Triglandi Recht-Gematigden Christen (1615) against Jacobus Triglandius.
