= Rudolph Goclenius =

German philosopher

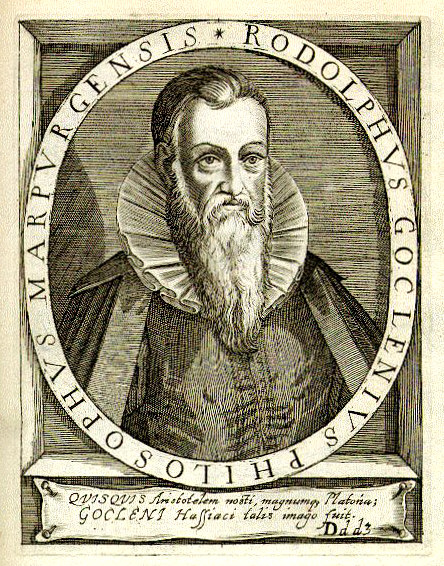
Rudolph Goclenius

Rudolph Goclenius the Elder (Latin: Rudolphus Goclenius; born Rudolf Gockel or Göckel; 1 March 1547 – 8 June 1628) was a German scholastic philosopher. He is sometimes credited with coining the term psychology in 1590, though the term had been used by Pier Nicola Castellani and Gerhard Synellius 65 years earlier.

== Life ==
Goclenius was born in the town of Korbach, located in Waldeck (present-day Waldeck-Frankenberg, Hesse).

He studied at the University of Erfurt, the University of Marburg and the University of Wittenberg, earning his M.A. in 1571. While at Wittenberg, Goclenius published his first book, a collection of short poems. In 1573, he returned to Korbach to direct the local gymnasium, and two years later, he took up the same role in Kassel (Michaelmas 1575). Prior to his appointment in Korbach, he had written to the town’s consuls, Antonius Leusmann and Johannes von Ditmarkhausen, urging the restoration of the school, emphasizing the importance of philosophical education, and requesting financial support due to personal hardship. During that period, he also responded to unusual natural phenomena: Jeremias Nicolai, a student at Korbach Stadtschule from Autumn 1574 onwards, brother of Philipp Nicolai, reported that Goclenius "promptly" composed a poem about "fiery air phenomena" (feurige Lufterscheinungen) observed in the city on November 14, 1574. It was published in Marburg later that year. City historian Wolfgang Medding has suggested that this poem was inspired by an aurora, a hypothesis supported by historical records of auroral observations. The atmospheric phenomena Goclenius first addressed poetically in 1574 reappeared in scholarly form three decades later, when he treated auroras ("chasmata") in his Mirror of Complete Physics (1604).

In 1581, Landgrave Wilhelm IV of Hesse-Kassel, himself a distinguished astronomer, denied Goclenius’s request to return to his hometown of Korbach but instead granted him a professorship at the University of Marburg. Goclenius was officially appointed on September 9 of that year and began his academic career by addressing his colleagues on the subject of physics. He delivered three hours of lectures daily: one for the general public (pro lectione publica), one for master's students (pro magistrandis), and one for bachelor's students (pro baccalaureandis). Over time, he held chairs in physics, logic, mathematics, and ethics, though the precise date of his appointment to the logic professorship remains uncertain, as noted by historian Franz Gundlach. As of December 18, 1589, Goclenius was still serving as Professor of Physics, a role in which he conferred the title of Magister upon thirty students. His transition to the logic chair is suggested by the preface dated January 13, 1590, to his Three Books of Philosophical Debates, on Certain Logical and Physical Questions, published in Marburg that same year. He began teaching mathematics intermittently from 1598, and on May 9, 1603, he succeeded Petrus Nigidius the Younger in the ethics professorship, adding it to his existing role in logic.

Goclenius was frequently consulted for his learned judgment on a variety of matters. In a letter to Otto Melander (dated July 4, 1597), he recounts having been commissioned by Wilhelm IV, Landgrave of Hesse-Kassel—through his Chancellor—to investigate the physical causes of witches floating, a task that led him to compose a speech on the subject. In the same letter, Goclenius expressed his approval of Melander’s work refuting the practice of witch purgation by cold water. On the occasion of student performances of Friedrich Dedekind’s The Christian Knight in February 1604 at the Katharineum in Braunschweig, Goclenius responded to a question posed by Rector Johannes Bechmann: “Whether comedies and tragedies are permissible in a well-ordered state.” He argued affirmatively that such plays, when performed with pious intent, contribute significantly to students’ intellectual and ethical development.

In 1618, Wilhelm's son Moritz appointed Goclenius as one of four delegates to represent Hesse-Kassel at the Synod of Dort, alongside Georg Cruciger, Paul Steinius, and Daniel Angelocrator. His instructions, dated October 1, 1618, outlined the approach and guidelines for conducting the delegates’ business. Moritz decreed that Steinius would serve as the leading delegate with voting rights. Although Goclenius was initially designated as an extraordinary delegate—“not indeed to sit, but only to listen, and to be consulted privately if necessary”—he was nonetheless granted the opportunity to address the assembly formally. In the sixty-seventh session, held on January 25, 1619, he delivered a speech in which he “thoroughly refuted the principal syllogism of the Remonstrants, which was derived from the execution of predestination, using logical principles.”

In his later years, Goclenius faced profound personal and institutional upheaval. The death of his son, Rudolph Goclenius the Younger, in 1621 deeply affected him, both emotionally and professionally. Following the Aulic Council’s judgment of 1623, which resolved the Marburg inheritance dispute in favor of Louis V, Landgrave of Hesse-Darmstadt, Goclenius was among the professors retained at the University of Marburg. On March 27, 1624, he formally swore allegiance to Louis V, thereby securing his continued position at the university. Correspondence from this period—particularly letters addressed to Johann Peter Lotichius—reveal Goclenius’s personal reflections on the political and academic turmoil of the time. The letters also reveal his declining health and literary output, alongside continued admiration for Lotichius’s scholarly achievements.

Recognizing Goclenius’s advanced age, George II, Landgrave of Hesse-Darmstadt, granted him retirement in 1627. George II directed the professors to nominate suitable successors for the chairs of Logic and Rhetoric. Responding to this directive, the faculty convened and, on June 20, 1627, recommended Reverend Konrad Greber for the extraordinary professorship of Logic and Dr. Theodor Höpingk for the professorship of Rhetoric. Although officially retired, Goclenius remained active in academic life and continued to participate in examinations throughout the following year. The final exam, however—held just one day before his death—took place in his absence. On the morning of Trinity Sunday, on June 8, 1628, as Goclenius was preparing to go to church, he suffered a stroke and died. The previous day, he had dinner with Hermann Vultejus and his son-in-law Christoph Deichmann, Chancellor of Lippe. Vultejus recalled, that Goclenius was mentally sharp and articulate, just as he had been in his younger days. After his burial, which took place two days later, Wolfgang Riemenschneider (Loriseca) delivered a speech praising Goclenius as "leader of today's philosophers, Marburgian Plato, European light, Hessian immortal glory". Paul Freher, in Theatrum virorum eruditione clarorum (1688), noted that Goclenius, “besides those to whom he granted the first degree in philosophy over a span of 35 years, personally conferred the honors of Master upon more than 600 individuals.”

Johann Balthasar Schupp, once Goclenius's pupil, satirically recounted that his teacher had declared the 1598 work Analecta, published in Lich, to be the best book he had ever written. The anecdote appears in Schupp’s Ambassadeur Zipphusius, a satirical allegory in which Zipphusius—a fictional schoolmaster from Mount Parnassus, the mythical seat of the Muses and a symbol of intellectual and artistic excellence—is dispatched to the princes and estates of the Holy Roman Empire with a critique of the educational system.

== Family ==
Before enrolling at Wittenberg on July 31, 1570, to pursue his master’s degree, Goclenius married his first wife, Margarethe. Abraham Saur, a jurist in Marburg, recorded the following in his chronicle for April 10:

M. Rudolphus Goclerius [sic] holds wedding. On this day / in the year of Christ 1570 as the Sun entered the Sign of Taurus / of which Astrologers say / it is auspicious for marriage / M. Rudolphus Goclerius [sic] / a young learned Man and Poet / celebrated his wedding in Korbach.

— Abraham Saur, Diarium Historicum (1582, p. 155; translated from German)

From this marriage his oldest son, Rudolph Goclenius the Younger, or Rudolf Goclenius, Jr. was born. He went on to become a professor in Marburg and a celebrated mathematician. It is thanks to Rudolph Goclenius, Jr., that a lunar crater bears his name. Additionally, he also worked on cures for the plague and gained fame for his miraculous use with the "weapon salve" or Powder of Sympathy. Among other notable descendants were Theodor Christoph Goclenius (1602–1673, medicine), Eduard Franz Goclenius (1643–1721, law) and Reinhard Goclenius (1678–1726, law). Theodor Christoph was briefly imprisoned following a student riot in May 1626, during which a garrison soldier was wounded in the head and later died, but was released when the injury was ultimately deemed non-lethal. He left Marburg and was entered into the registers of the University of Rostock in December 1626, though without any indication of his origins; his name appears misspelled as "Cocklenius." In 1632, he returned to Marburg, where he earned his doctorate with the thesis Positiones Medicae, though he never pursued an academic career. The thesis reflects a Hippocratic view of human frailty, portraying disease as a fundamental aspect of bodily existence. Eduard Franz studied jurisprudence in Marburg and Rinteln, earning his doctorate in 1666 with the dissertation De Rebus Merae Facultatis. He subsequently held a series of academic appointments at Rinteln: Professor of Logic in 1674, Professor of Law Extraordinary in 1677, and Full Professor in 1680. Reinhard obtained his doctorate in law at Rinteln in 1702 with De Jure Singulari, and went on to serve as Professor of Law at the Gymnasium in Steinfurt, court judge, and senior councilor to the Count of Bentheim.

== Philosophical attitude ==
Goclenius’s philosophical outlook was grounded in a deep reverence for logic as the organizing principle of both nature and thought. This conviction is expressed in an epigram written during his tenure at Kassel Gymnasium, for the literary games held there in December 1576, where he likens the removal of logic to extinguishing Prometheus’s fire—leaving the world in chaos and darkness. For Goclenius, logic was not merely a tool but the very light by which reality could be apprehended.

The epigram was later included in Wilhelm Adolph Scribonius’s Rerum physicarum, published in Frankfurt in 1577:

If you remove Logic, all knowledge is gone:
And if anything remains, it's mere fable and shadow.
Let the great lamp of Titania be extinguished:
And you'll see everything in blind darkness.
Take away the light of Logic and Prometheus' fire:
And the world will be hidden in small shadows.
Only an inert mass of undigested matter will remain,
And chaos will reign as it did before.
And without a standard, without law, without a certain order,
everything that will be established by us will go.

— Epigramma in Physicas partitiones Adolphi Scribonii, in G. A. Scribonius, Rerum physicarum, juxta leges logicas methodica explicatio, Frankfurt 1577, p. 35.

In his principal work on metaphysics from 1598, he reaffirmed that logic is the universal and indispensable foundation of both philosophy and theology. It is not merely a servant (ministerium), but also a teacher (magisterium), judge (iudicium), and ruler (imperium); without logic, no discipline—sacred or secular—can maintain coherence, truth, or intelligibility. Goclenius’s unwavering commitment to logic as the bedrock of all disciplines was, nevertheless, complemented by a methodological framework that allowed for the inclusion of empirical elements such as sense perception, observation, experience, and induction. This dual emphasis suggests a more layered philosophical outlook, though later commentators have questioned the extent to which Goclenius genuinely integrated this empirical dimension into his practice.

Generations of scholars grappled with how to categorize Goclenius’s philosophical position. In 1744, Johann Jakob Brucker described him as fere princeps—“almost the chief”—among the Aristotelico-Ramist syncretists, yet refrained from labeling him a Semi-Ramist, reserving that term for Bartholomäus Keckermann. Brucker viewed such syncretism critically, referring to it as malum reddiderunt deterius—a worsening of an already troubled situation. By the turn of the 20th century, Rudolf Eisler applied the term “Semi-Ramist” to Goclenius in his philosophical dictionaries, where it appeared as a neutral classificatory label. Decades earlier, however, Jacob Freudenthal cautioned against such reductive classification, arguing that while Goclenius’s logical writings might justify the label “half-Ramist,” the term becomes wholly inadequate when applied to his broader philosophical activity.

During his rectorship at Korbach Stadtschule, Goclenius demonstrated his affiliation with Ramism by composing a scholarly elegy on Ramus’s death. His commitment to Ramist principles was also recognized by fellow Ramists: In a letter dated September 1575, Friedrich Beurhusius described Goclenius to Johann Thomas Freigius as a devoted Ramist, grouping him with other prominent schoolmen such as Johann Lambach and Bernhard Copius. While Goclenius’s personal affiliations with Ramism were becoming visible, institutional forces at Marburg were also beginning to shift. In the same year, the University of Marburg underwent a significant curricular reform aimed at formally introducing Ramism, despite the continued influence of Melanchthonian educational traditions within the institution. The resulting edict, issued by Wilhelm and Ludwig, Landgraves of Hesse, on October 11, 1575, authorized the use of Ramist teachings in the Paedagogium—but notably, only in conjunction with established Melanchthonian instructional methods. The synthesis culminated in the work of Joannes Bilstenius, who coined the term “Philippo-Ramism” to describe this emerging model. Goclenius actively supported this intellectual development by composing an "Autoschediasma", a poetic preface to Bilstenius’s Syntagma Philippo-Rameum artium liberalium (Basel 1588). The poem functions both as a tribute to the work and as a didactic exhortation to aspiring scholars.

Over the course of his academic life, Goclenius’s philosophical orientation moved beyond his Ramist leanings, aligning more closely with Aristotle and his Renaissance interpreters. This evolution in thought is recorded by Johann Heinrich Alsted in his 1610 manual Academic and Scholastic Advisor, where he outlined a canon of thinkers—Aristotle, Julius Caesar Scaliger, Jacopo Zabarella, Jakob Schegk—whom Goclenius regarded as essential to philosophical education. According to Alsted, Goclenius considered these authors especially worthy of study and described them as forming the basis of a "philosophical library"—an expression of their exemplary status rather than a claim to exclusivity. Among them, Scaliger held a uniquely elevated status: Goclenius referred to his Exercitationes as his “Bible,” a designation that sparked semantic debates in the seventeenth century.

Alsted’s presentation finds subtle confirmation in the structure and ambition of Goclenius’s Lexicon Philosophicum (1613), together with its Greek companion volume, which Giglioni (2016) characterizes as a microcosmic library reflecting the intellectual climate of its time. Scaliger’s influence is particularly pronounced; Giglioni notes that he is cited “on almost every single page” of the Lexicon. Zabarella and Schegk, while less dominant, are also frequently referenced, forming a secondary tier of influence. This citation pattern closely mirrors the hierarchy described by Alsted, lending further weight to his report and highlighting the central role these thinkers played in shaping Goclenius’s philosophical project.

== Works ==
In his Disquisitiones Philosophicae (Philosophical Inquiries), published in 1599, Goclenius presents a synoptic table that categorizes philosophical doctrines, or liberal arts, into distinct domains of knowledge. It encompasses two main categories: Real Doctrines and Arts Guiding Our Understanding. Real Doctrines delve into objects of our understanding, including Universal Philosophy (which deals with being in general) and Particular Philosophy (addressing specific beings). Within Particular Philosophy, we find Theoretical (or Real) Philosophy (studying essence and quantity) and Practical (or Moral) Philosophy (focusing on ethics and politics). The practice of Physics is the Art of Medicine. The conjunction of Astronomy and Geography is Cosmography. The second category, Arts Guiding Our Understanding, includes Rhetoric, Grammar, and Logic. Given the diversity of his works, this classification system serves as a useful organizing principle, providing an overview of his writings. In addition, it clarifies how Goclenius conceptually structured the world through his main category of Real Doctrines. To guide readers through Goclenius’s prolific output, the following table offers a selection of his works arranged according to the disciplinary framework he proposed in 1599.

Discipline	Representative Works (Selected Titles)
First Philosophy	Introduction to the First Philosophy of the Peripatetics and Scholastics (1598); Supplement to Summa Terminorum Metaphysicorum (1609); Miscellanies of Theological and Philosophical Matters (1607–08)
Theology	Speech on the Native and Hereditary Stain and Corruption in Us (1588); Apologetic Theses (1606); Collegium Philosophico-Theologicum (1610)
Physics	Schools or Physical Disputations (1591, 1595, 1602); Physical Disputations (1598); Mirror of Complete Physics (1604)
Cosmography	Cosmography or Description of the Sphere of the World (1599)
Ethics	Ethical Problems Useful in Large Part for Understanding Aristotle and Plato (1595); Ethical Exercises (1596); Exercises and Ethical & Political Inquiries (1601)
Politics	Politics from the Monuments of the Divine Philosopher Plato (1607)
Rhetoric	Rhetorical Problems (1596)
Grammar	Analects of Observations on the Latin Language (1598); Grammatical Problems (1601); Observations on the Latin Language (1601, 1610)
Logic	Logical Problems (1589–94); Institutions of Logic on Invention (1598); Introduction to Aristotle's Organon (1598); Gymnasium Logicum (1614); Dialectic of P. Ramus (1600); Diatribes and Meditations (1617); Institutions of Logic (1601); Logical and Philosophical Controversies (1609); Dialectical Partitions (1595, 1598); Logical Practice (1595)

Goclenius authored over 70 books, with more than half published between 1589 and 1599. His extensive list of publications also includes numerous disputations. This sustained academic activity was partly driven by the statutes issued by Landgrave Philip I on January 14, 1564, which required professors at the University of Marburg to conduct weekly examinations. Beyond this institutional mandate, Goclenius’s conviction that truth emerges through debate—whether with others or with oneself—played a crucial role. The themes of his disputations follow an encyclopedic plan, as evidenced not only by the structure of his published books but also by the testimony of his former pupil and printer, Zacharias Palthenius. In a letter to Johann Hartmann Beyer, which served as the foreword to the 1598 Frankfurt edition of Physicae Disputationes, Palthenius explicitly refers to the “Encyclopedic Disputations” ("Disputationes Encyclopaedicas") of Goclenius, indicating that these disputations were conceived as part of a systematic intellectual enterprise.

While Goclenius is known for popularizing the term psychology, his most enduring intellectual legacy lies in the realm of ontology. Building on Aristotle’s foundational work, Goclenius helped establish the discipline of ontology by adopting and advancing its philosophical framework, shaping its development in the 17th century. His use of the term 'ontology' in the Lexicon philosophicum (1613) marked a pivotal moment in the field’s evolution, although the term itself was first introduced by Jacob Lorhard in Ogdoas Scholastica (1606).

=== Psychology ===
Goclenius’s contributions to ontology laid the groundwork for future metaphysical inquiry—yet his influence extended beyond this domain. He played a formative role in shaping the emerging field later termed ‘psychology.’ Lecture notes from the University of Marburg suggest that he used the term psychologia as early as 1582, as part of a broader classification of knowledge—consistent with earlier usages by J. T. Freigius (1574) and F. Beurhusius (1581). In 1586, he presided over two academic disputations in which the word reappeared in adjectival form (psychologicae), now functioning as an internal heading for a cluster of theses concerning the nature and faculties of the soul. These clusters of psychological theses were embedded within a broader philosophical schema, structured around traditional headings such as logic, grammar, rhetoric, physics, and metaphysics. Although the psychologicae sections specifically addressed the soul’s powers and operations, they offered distinct conceptualizations: one emphasized the rational powers of the soul (vis cognoscendi & eligendi) as central to human experience. The other denied that rationality alone accounts for the soul’s operation, proposing instead a more integrated view (personaliter) of human psychological functioning.

This early, segmented deployment of psychologia—as an internal heading within a broader philosophical taxonomy—prefigures its elevation to titular prominence in ΨΥΧΟΛΟΓΙΑ. Published in 1590, it was the first printed book to feature the term “psychology” in its title, appearing shortly after Goclenius’s transition from physics to logic. The full title translates to English as Psychology: that is, on the perfection of man, his mind, and especially its origin—the comments and discussions of certain theologians and philosophers of our time who are shown on the following page. Immediately following this, the title page adds: Pleasant and useful reading for students of Philosophy. This description positions the work as both a scholarly resource and a didactic tool, aimed at cultivating philosophical inquiry among students. The title itself suggests that psychology denotes both the object of study—namely, 'the perfection of man, his mind, and especially its origin'—and the discursive process through which this subject is explored: 'the comments and discussions of certain theologians and philosophers of our time.'

The dedicatory letter to Hartmann von Berlepsch, which precedes the treatises, reveals Goclenius’s dual intent—philosophical and editorial—in shaping the volume. He presents the study of the mind as a pursuit both noble in aim and clouded by obscurity, requiring careful inquiry and intellectual humility. He introduces the central aporia—whether the mind is divinely infused (Creationism) or naturally generated (Traducianism)—and emphasizes the difficulty of grasping such truths due to the imperfection of human intellect. Drawing on Aristotelian and Thomistic epistemology, he affirms that obscurity often arises from the limitations of the knower rather than the thing known. Despite these challenges, he defends the value of rational inquiry, invoking the divine gift of critical judgment and the dialectical process by which truth emerges. In a theological turn, he reflects on the mind’s nature as a mirror of divine reality, asserting that contemplation of the mind leads to the recognition of the Archetypus—the divine image in which humans were created. The letter culminates in a vision of the soul’s longing for divine knowledge, symbolized by the coelestis Academia (heavenly Academy). It introduces the volume as a scholarly offering: a series of inquiries into the mind’s origin, excerpted from the commentaries of learned men and purposefully assembled into a dialectical sequence—offered as a gift to a promising young student.

In the absence of bibliographic references in the modern sense, scholars over the past several decades have gradually identified the sources of the treatises. The following table presents a summary of their findings; entries marked ‘Unknown’ refer to treatises for which no definitive source has yet been identified in existing scholarship.

Number	Author	Title of Treatise	Source
1	Hermann Vultejus	On the Philosophical Perfection of Man	Note by Goclenius: From a public lecture at the University of Marburg. A preliminary discussion (προλεγομένων) before he began interpreting Plato’s Timaeus on January 30, 1581.
2	François Du Jon	Explanation of the Question: Whether the Human Mind Is Propagated by the Parents	Protoktisia (1589, pp. 73-95)
3	Johann Jakob Grynaeus	A Reasoned and Modest Explanation of the Same Question: Problem—Is the Human Soul Transmitted or Created by God?	Synopsis historiae hominis (1579, pp. 125-142)
4	Johann Jacob Coler	A Theological and Philosophical Question: Whether the Soul Is Transmitted or Daily Inspired by God—Collected Most Diligently from Ancient and Recent Writings	Quaestio theologica et philosophica (1586, pp. 5-29)
5	Caspar Peucer	On the Essence, Nature, and Origin of the Human Mind: A Commentary. Revised by Goclenius	Unknown. On the textual background see Roebel (2012, p. 258).
6	Aegidius Hunnius	Whether Souls Are Still Infused into Humans by Divine Inspiration: An Explanation	Praelectiones in viginti et unum priora capita Geneseos (1589, pp. 30-31). Translated into German by Melchior Tilesius in 1590.
7	Laskói Csókás Péter	Dissertation on the Problem: Are Rational Souls Propagated Like Bodies by Seminal Transmission, or Are They Daily Created by God and Infused into the Bodies of the Newborn?	De homine (1585, pp. 176-253)
8	Rudolf Hospinian	Oration Affirming: The Soul Is Whole in the Whole Body, and Entire in Each of Its Parts	Oratio in genere didascalico (1586). Added to Coler's Quaestio theologica et philosophica, from page 30 onwards. See No. 4.
9	Timothie Bright	Remarks on Transmission	In Physicam Gulielmi Adolphi Scribonii (1584, pp. 15-32)
10	Johann Ludwig Havenreuter	Opinion on the Question: Is the Mind Implanted in Us by God, or Not?	Unknown. Almost identical with a portion of his commentary to the third book of Aristotle's De anima published later at Frankfurt (1605, pp. 333-339).
11	Rudolph Goclenius	Aporia on the Origin of the Mind	Unknown

Among the entries, one treatise is distinctly Goclenius’s own. The final item in the volume, titled Dissertatio De Ortu Animi on each page, was originally delivered during his physics lectures at the University of Marburg—as indicated by the phrase praelegentis Physicam in Schola Marpurg[ensi] (lecturing on Physics at the School of Marburg). Though authentically Goclenius’s, the text was not newly written for the 1590 volume but republished within it.

Beginning with the second edition (1594) and continuing in the third (1597), Goclenius adopted a more transparent editorial approach by explicitly naming the sources of the treatises, thereby making their origins traceable. In the 1594 edition, he added an excerpt from Nicolaus Taurellus’s Philosophiae Triumphus (1573), which was appended at the end of the volume. The 1597 edition introduced three additional excerpts—Exotericarum Exercitationum (1557) by Julius Caesar Scaliger, De Operibus Dei Intra Spacium Sex Dierum (1591) by Girolamo Zanchi, and Universae Philosophiae Epitome (1596) by Girolamo Savonarola—which were inserted at specific points within the existing sequence. This resulted in a renumbering of the contents: Scaliger was assigned No. 5, Savonarola No. 6, and Zanchius No. 7.

The placement of these texts reflects a deliberate editorial arrangement, though the principles guiding their inclusion remained unstated. As Mengal (2005) observed—referring specifically to the third edition—the contributors, excluding Scaliger, Savonarola, and Bright, mainly form a relatively cohesive circle of South German Protestant theologians. Their shared positions on the origin of the soul and their integrated approach to theology and medicine suggest a distinct intellectual milieu—one that likely informed Goclenius’s editorial decisions.

In the 17th century, Goclenius's ΨΥΧΟΛΟΓΙΑ was widely read and cited by scholars such as Robert Burton, Daniel Sennert, and Jakob Thomasius. Goclenius himself revisited his ΨΥΧΟΛΟΓΙΑ in the Mirror of Complete Physics (1604) and in various philosophical disputations.

Nevertheless, historians of psychology have long debated whether Goclenius, with his ΨΥΧΟΛΟΓΙΑ, aimed at an innovative approach for exploring the soul or to establish psychology as an independent field. In 1808, Friedrich August Carus referred to ΨΥΧΟΛΟΓΙΑ as a Lehrbuch (‘textbook’), placing it in chronological succession to Casmann’s Psychologia anthropologica (1594). His characterization implied more than a merely didactic orientation: in early 19th-century German academic usage, the designation Lehrbuch could signal a systematic effort to define, structure, and legitimize a field of inquiry. Yet this interpretation was already contested in the 19th century. Wilhelm Fridolin Volkmann (1875) rejected the notion that ΨΥΧΟΛΟΓΙΑ was a textbook in any formal sense. He described it instead as a mere collection of treatises by various authors, most of them concerned with the then-prevalent refutation of Traducianism, and noted that Goclenius himself contributed only a brief concluding remark. More recent scholarship has echoed this skepticism, favoring different classifications of the work: describing it as a Sammelwerk ('collection', Schüling, 1967), Sammelband ('compilation', Scheerer, 1989; Stiening, 1999), or Anthology (Vidal, 2011). These classifications underscore the composite nature of the volume, though Goclenius's editorial revision of at least one treatise (Peucer) suggests a more deliberate curatorial role, complicating this interpretation.

In a 1594 preface to Bruno Seidel’s Commentarius Didascalicus, Goclenius offered a sweeping defense of psychology, praising its dignity, utility, and delight. He redefined psychology as “the history of the animated body,” expanding the term—originally applied to the mind or rational soul (“the nobler part”)—to encompass the full spectrum of human life, from vegetative and sensitive faculties to rational operations and anatomical structure. Mengal (2005) discussed this synecdochic redefinition and situated it within a broader anthropological and physiological framework. This conceptual expansion corresponds to the scope of Goclenius’s academic disputations and treatises published from 1591 onward. Between 1591 and 1606, he authored over two dozen works that explored key topics in Aristotelian psychology, including the nature and faculties of the soul, the external senses, and the mind’s rational and voluntary operations. Among these works, the Libelli Aristotelis De Sensu & Sensilibus. Castigata versio & Analysis Logica (1596) stood out as a significant contribution: a corrected edition and logical analysis of Aristotle’s treatise on sense perception.

=== Logic ===
Carveth Read considered Goclenius’s most significant contribution to term logic to be the structure now known as the Goclenian Sorites. In the words of the British logician:

"It is the shining merit of Goclenius to have restored the Premises of the Sorites to the usual order of Fig. I.: whereby he has raised to himself a monument more durable than brass, and secured indeed the very cheapest immortality. How expensive, compared with this, was the method of the Ephesian incendiary!"

The expression “Goclenian Sorites” emerged within the Wolffian school of philosophy, eventually becoming a recognized term in syllogistic logic. The label was used by Johann Peter Reusch, a follower of Christian Wolff and professor at the University of Jena, who attributes the structure to Goclenius, — specifically referencing the Isagoge in Organon Aristotelis (Frankfurt 1598, Part 2, Chapter 4, p. 255ff). Reusch describes the form as one “in which propositions are linked so that the subject of the previous proposition becomes the predicate of the next, until the first predicate is concluded from the last subject.” The following table illustrates the logical flow of Reusch’s example from his Systema Logicum (1734). Each statement builds upon the previous one in reverse order, culminating in the conclusion: “He who is devoted to virtue is happy.”

Goclenian Sorites: Inverted Logical Structure (adapted from Reusch, 1734, p. 674)
Step	Predicate	Subject	Logical Form
1	is happy	He who enjoys lasting pleasure and joy	E → F
2	enjoys lasting pleasure and joy	He who attains a continuous and intuitive representation of his perfections	D → E
3	attains such representation	He who acquires perfections everywhere	C → D
4	acquires perfections everywhere	He who always acts in accordance with natural law	B → C
5	always acts in accordance with natural law	He who is devoted to virtue	A → B
∴	is happy	He who is devoted to virtue	A → F

Goclenius noted in his Isagoge of 1598 that Aristotle remained silent on the Sorites—perhaps, he suggested, because it was regarded as philosophically deceptive. Goclenius, however, rejected this view, arguing that the Sorites was not inherently misleading. When applied in contexts governed by necessary connections—such as between causes and effects, or between genera and species—it could be as legitimate and rigorous as a standard syllogism. In defending its validity, Goclenius challenged the prevailing Aristotelian orthodoxy and sought to rehabilitate the Sorites as a serious instrument of philosophical reasoning. An example of this structure in argumentative context had already appeared in his Dissertatio De Ortu Animi, which concluded the first edition of the ΨΥΧΟΛΟΓΙΑ in 1590.

Yet despite Carveth Read’s assessment, the logical form now known as the Goclenian Sorites was not invented by Goclenius. It appears centuries earlier in the writings of St. Thomas Aquinas, who describes a cumulative syllogistic method in his Commentary on the Metaphysics of Aristotle:

"[A] second demonstration takes as its starting point the conclusion of a first demonstration, whose terms are understood to contain the middle term which was the starting point of the first demonstration. Thus the second demonstration will proceed from four terms the first from three only, the third from five, and the fourth from six; so that each demonstration adds one term. Thus it is clear that first demonstrations are included in subsequent ones, as when this first demonstration—every B is A, every C is B, therefore every C is A—is included in this demonstration—every C is A, every D is C, therefore every D is A; and this again is included in the demonstration whose conclusion is that every E is A, so that for this final conclusion there seems to be one syllogism composed of several syllogisms having several middle terms. This may be expressed thus: every B is A, every C is B, every D is C, every E is D, therefore every E is A."

=== Lexicography ===
Goclenius envisioned the future creation of a Lexicon Philosophicum—a terminological companion to support a more refined and accurate account of first philosophy—in the foreword to his metaphysics introduction of 1598. Acknowledging the complexity of metaphysical disputations, he offered the Isagoge as a guide to help students navigate them more easily. Yet he also expressed dissatisfaction with aspects of his current presentation, promising a more complete treatment of first philosophy to come, one that would be supplemented by a philosophical dictionary (una cum Lexico Philosophico). The Dilucidationes Canonum Philosophicorum (Clarifications of Philosophical Canons, 1604) represents a crucial intermediate step in Goclenius’s lexicographical project. The book contains 183 philosophical canons and 58 quaestiones, and is framed throughout as a Prodromus Lexici Philosophici—a forerunner to the lexicon proper.

Goclenius’s lexicographical project reached its culmination with the publication of two philosophical dictionaries in 1613 and 1615. The Lexicon Philosophicum (1613), recognized by Lutz Geldsetzer (1971) as an important source for early Latin philosophical terminology—comparable to the subsequent lexicon of Johannes Micraelius— was conceived as a key to unlocking the doors of philosophy. Like Höcker’s Clavis Philosophiae Aristotelicae (1606), it adopted the metaphor of a clavis—a key—signaling a shared ambition to systematize access to philosophical knowledge. Complementing this work, the Lexicon Philosophicum Graecum (1615) was a Latin dictionary of Greek philosophical terminology. Following the Greek entries, Goclenius included a substantial Latin appendix containing a collection of obsolete, rare, or malformed expressions—neologisms, solecisms, barbarisms, and other linguistic irregularities—accompanied by suggested corrections and stylistic improvements. This appendix reflected concerns he had already voiced in his Problematum Grammaticorum (1601), where he urged philosophers to uphold linguistic purity and avoid corrupted Latin usage. There, he catalogued dozens of problematic expressions and proposed more precise alternatives, underscoring his conviction that philosophical clarity depends on grammatical rigor.

The Lexicon Philosophicum was printed in Frankfurt am Main by Katharina Becker, widow of Matthäus Becker the Younger, who had inherited and briefly operated the press following his death in 1612. The completion of both lexicons owed much to the assistance of Johannes Wirtz (1591–1658), a scholar from Zurich whom Goclenius held in high regard, referring to him in verse as “the hope of his dear homeland.” After studying theology under Heinrich Erni and earning his degree in March 1612, Wirtz traveled to Marburg, where he participated in two disputations on the Eucharist under Raphael Eglin. During his time in Marburg—before returning to Zurich in 1615—he played a crucial role in the production of Goclenius’s dictionaries. In the preface to the reader, Goclenius openly acknowledged Wirtz’s contribution, praising his diligence and command of Latin and Greek. He noted that Wirtz “not only transcribed a large part of this work, but also corrected it,” and emphasized that his “industry and outstanding erudition in both languages” helped prevent further delays in completing the project.

While earlier scholarship, such as Geldsetzer’s, emphasized their role as reference works, more recent studies have come to view Goclenius’s dictionaries as philosophically rich texts that reflect the intellectual climate of the Renaissance. Both dictionaries were reprinted together in facsimile by Georg Olms Verlag—first in 1964 and again in a second edition in 1980.

== Publications ==
Bibliographies of Goclenius's writings were compiled by Friedrich Wilhelm Strieder (Grundlage zu einer hessischen Gelehrten und Schriftsteller Geschichte, Bd. 4, Göttingen 1784, pp. 428–487; Bd. 9, Cassel 1794, p. 381; Bd. 13, Cassel 1802, pp. 341–343; Bd. 15, Cassel 1806, p. 338) and Franz Joseph Schmidt (Materialien zur Bibliographie von Rudolph Goclenius sen. (1547-1628) und Rudolph Goclenius jun. (1572-1621), Hamm 1979). Schmidt was a historian of medicine based in Hamm (Westphalia). His bibliography is organized into five groups: scientific works, academic writings, occasional writings, writings with Goclenius as editor or author of a foreword, and writings listed in the catalogue of the British Library but not in Strieder's Dictionary. Strieder’s bibliography is arranged chronologically.

- Oratio de natura sagarum in purgatione & examinatione per Frigidam aquis innatantium, Marburg 1584. [A speech delivered at a graduation ceremony on November 19, 1583; republished in Panegyrici Academiae Marpurgensis, Marburg 1590, pp. 190–203; and again, slightly shortened and with typographical errors, in Otto Melander’s Resolutio praecipuarum quaestionum criminalis adversus sagas processus, Lich 1597. The reprint in Melander’s book is preceded by a letter from Goclenius to Melander.]
- Oratio de Nativa et Haereditaria in nobis labe & corruptione, Marburg 1588.
- Problemata logica, pars I 1589, pars II 1590; Pars I-V 1594 (reprint: Frankfurt: Minerva, 1967, in 5 voll.).
- ΨΥΧΟΛΟΓΙΑ: hoc est, de hominis perfectione, animo, et in primis ortu hujus, commentationes ac disputationes quorundam theologorum & philosophorum nostrae aetatis, Marburg 1590; Marburg 1594 (enlarged); Marburg 1597 (enlarged).
- Scholae seu disputationes physicae, Marburg 1591 (new editions: Marburg 1595 & Marburg 1602; Physicae Disputationes, Marburg 1598).
- Partitio dialectica, Frankfurt 1595.
- Isagoge in peripateticorum et scholasticorum primam philosophiam, quae dici consuevit metaphysica, Frankfurt 1598 (reprint: Hildesheim: Georg Olms, 1976).
- Institutionum logicarum de inventione liber unus, Marburg 1598.
- Cosmographiae seu sphaerae mundi descriptionis, Marburg 1599.
- Disquisitiones philosophicae, Marburg, 1599.
- P. Rami Dialectica cum praeceptorum explicationibus, Oberursel 1600.
- Appendix IIII. Dialogistica, Marburg 1602.
- Physicae completae speculum, Frankfurt 1604.
- Dilucidationes canonum philosophicorum, Lich 1604.
- Controversia logicae et philosophiae, ad praxin logicam directae, quibus praemissa sunt theoremata seu praecepta logica, Marburg 1604.
- Miscellaneorum Theologicorum Et Philosophicorum, Marburg 1607; Marburg 1608.
- Conciliator philosophicus, Kassel 1609 (reprint: Hildesheim, Georg Olms, 1980).
- Lexicon philosophicum quo tanquam clave philosophiae fores aperiuntur, Frankfurt 1613, and Lexicon philosophicum Graecum, Marburg 1615 (reprint in one volume: Hildesheim: Georg Olms, 1980).

The book titled 'Rhapsodus,' from Uffenbach's library, contains a collection of unpublished manuscripts by Goclenius. These manuscripts include letters, observations, dissertations, various critiques, and poems (Bibliothecae Uffenbachianae Universalis, Tomus III, Frankfurt 1730, pp. 488-490).
