= Nicolaas Grevinckhoven =

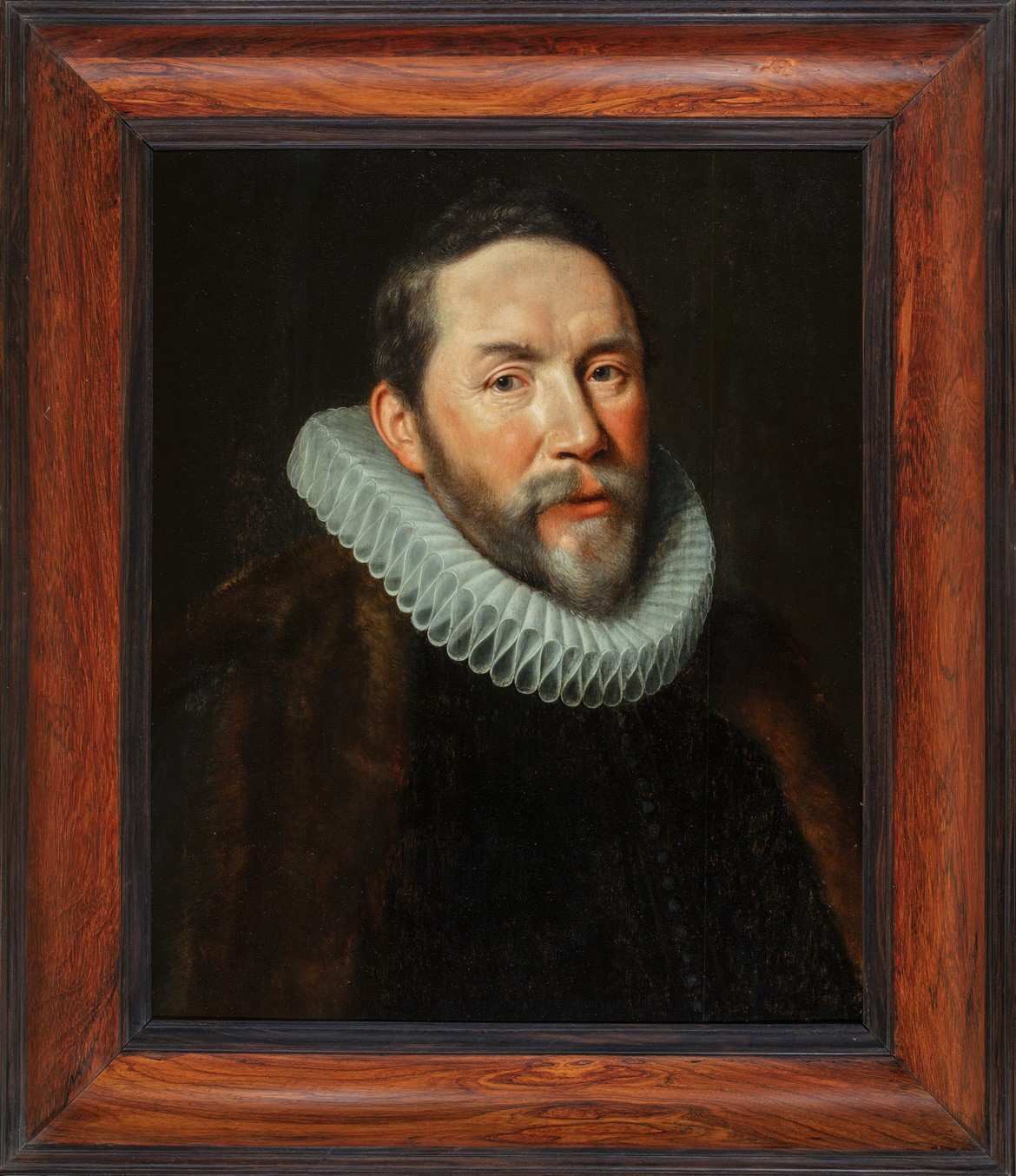
Nicolaas Grevinckhoven

Nicolaas Grevinckhoven (Grevinchovius, Grevinghoven or Grevinchoven in German sources) (died 1632) was a Dutch Protestant minister, a combative proponent of the Remonstrant party.

== Life ==
He studied in Leiden. From 1601 he was a preacher in Rotterdam. He attended the debate between Jacobus Arminius and Franciscus Gomarus in 1609, signed the Remonstrance of 1610, and attended the Hague Conference of 1611. Around 1610 he had a high-profile debate with William Ames; and John Owen later quoted from his written work against Arminians in general.

In Rotterdam he was on bad terms with the Contra-Remonstrant minister Cornelis Geselius, who quarrelled insistently with Grevinckhoven at the prompting of the extremist Adriaan Smout. The result was an intervention of the magistrates, with the Contra-Remonstrants worshipping outside the town. With Jacobus Taurinus of Utrecht he was one of the most strident of Remonstrant pamphleteers.

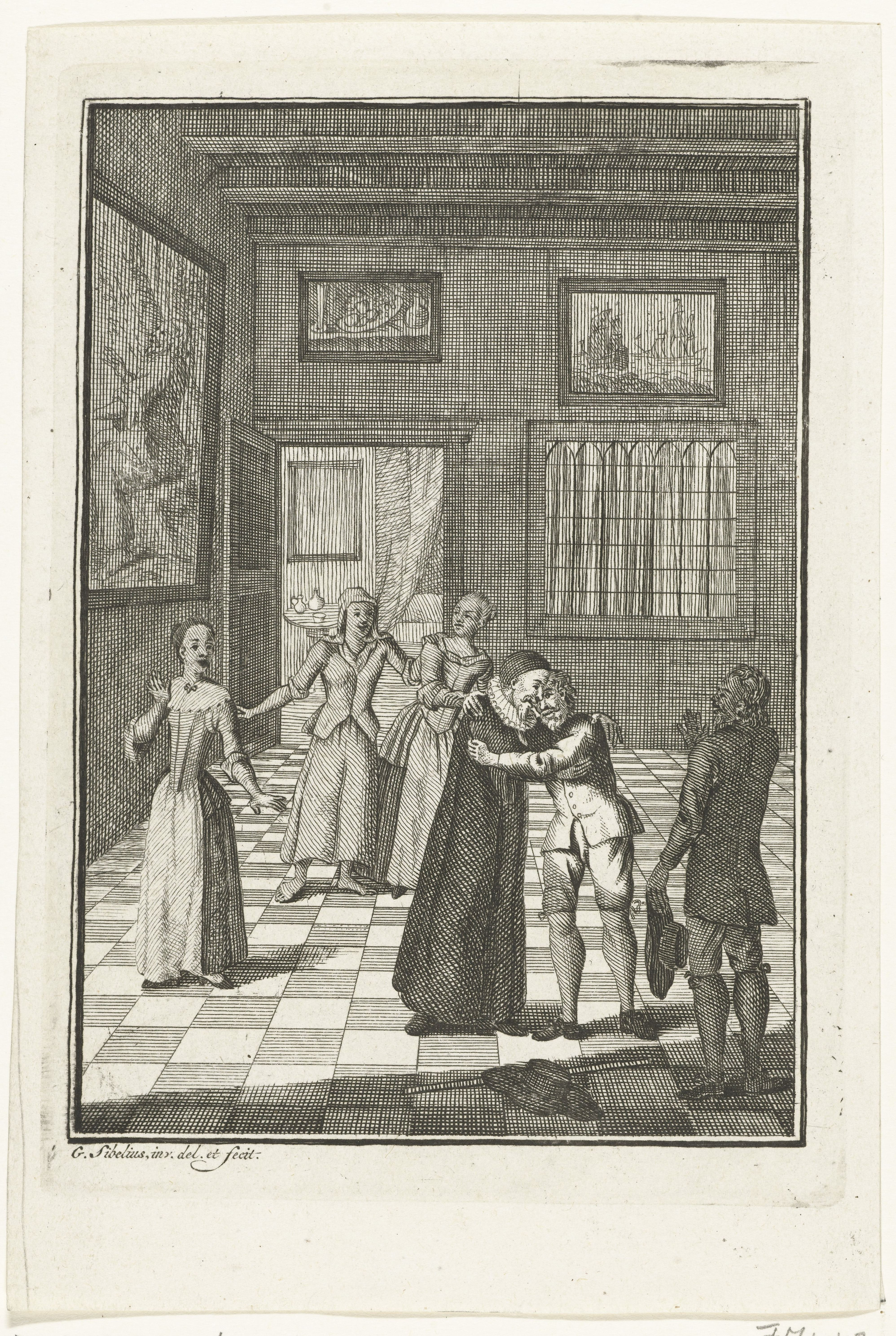
Hugo Grotius and Nicolaas Grevinckhoven in Antwerp

In Antwerp after the Synod of Dort in 1619, he tried to rally the Remonstrants, who had suffered defeat at the Synod in theological terms, and had also lost a major political battle in Holland. He was one of those reshaping the movement into the Remonstrant Reformed Brotherhood, in a committee with Johannes Wtenbogaert, Eduardus Poppius, Carolus Niellius and Johannes Arnoldi Corvinus. While there he provided shelter for Hugo Grotius, recently escaped from imprisonment, in 1621. Grevinckhoven spent time in Holstein.
