= Harboldus Tombergen =

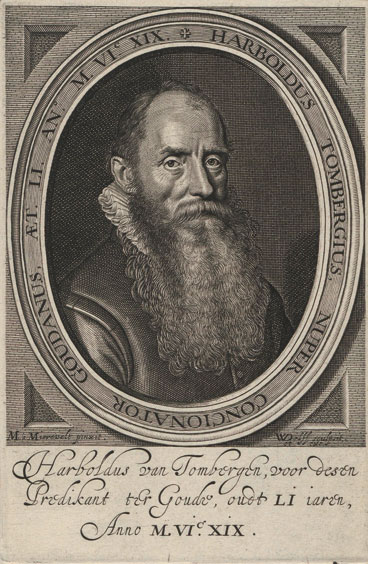

Personal life
- Born: 1568
- Died: 5 October 1625 (aged 56–57)

Religious life
- Religion: Christianity

Harboldus Tombergen (Warburg, 1568 – Friedrichstadt, 5 October 1625) was a Dutch preacher and one of the founders of the Remonstrant Brotherhood.

== Biography ==
Tombergen became a preacher in Gouda at the end of 1598. Previously he had been a preacher in Ruhrort (Germany). He was a Jesuit-trained Roman Catholic theologian who had converted to Lutheranism. He was attracted by the writing Corte verclaringhe by the Gouda preacher Herman Herbers and was brought to Gouda by the latter. In Gouda he worked with father and son Herman and Theodorus (Dirk) Herbers. They belonged to the Arminians. Together with them he wrote the Short Education of Children in the Christian Religion, also known as the Gouda Catechism. After Herbers' death in 1607, he worked closely with his Gouda colleague Eduard Poppius.

For his controversial publication in 1616 De engepoorte about the election, he wrote De Cleyne Zandtberch in 1612. Both books were printed by the libertine Gouse printer Jasper Tournay. After the Synod of Dordrecht in 1618/1619, the Court of Holland issued an order that Tombergen and his supporters were prohibited from holding church meetings. He was exiled and taken on a farmer's cart to Waalwijk, which was then under Spanish authority. Both Tombergen and Poppius were removed from office, and their colleague Dirk Herbers also shared this fate. Tombergen traveled on to Antwerp and, like Poppius, joined the Remonstrant Brotherhood.

In 1621 Tombergen returned clandestinely to Gouda. He preached there again several times, but decided to sell his house and settled in Friedrichstadt in Schleswig-Holstein. He died there on October 5, 1625, at the age of 58. His son Daniël and grandson Willem made a name for themselves in Gouda as glaziers and restorers of Gouda glasses. Willem was also a notary in Gouda.

== Notes and references ==
=== Sources ===
- Abels, P.H.A.M. Van ketternest tot bolwerk van rechtzinnigheid in: Duizend jaar Gouda, een stadsgeschiedenis, blz. 448/449, Hilversum, 2002
- Walvis, Ignatius Goudsche onkatolijke kerkzaken uitg. Eburon, Delft 1999
