= Carolus Niellius =

Dutch Remonstrant minister (1576–1652)

Carolus Niellius (Charles de Nielles) (1576 – 1652) was a Dutch Remonstrant minister.

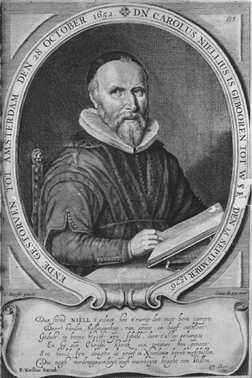
Carolus Niellius, engraving c. 1652.

== Early life ==
His father was Charles de Nielles the elder, from Tournai, a Reformed minister who worked in Antwerp and Wesel, and ended his life in 1604 at the Walloon church in Hanau. The son was born at Wesel, and came in 1604 from Cologne to Utrecht as a preacher to the Walloon congregation, on the invitation of Anthoine L'Empereur. His brother Henricus Niellius was another Remonstrant, whose widow married Simon Episcopius.

== The period of the Synod of Dort ==
In 1615 Niellius defended Simon Goulart the Younger to the Walloon Consistorium of Amsterdam. Goulart was accused of heterodox theological views. The defence was unsuccessful.

Niellius was one of the Remonstrants summoned to the 1618 Synod of Dort (Dordrecht), set up to decide on the divisive theological issues in the Dutch Reformed Church. At the Synod, Niellius protested at the end of the 57th session, which expelled the Remonstrants there from further participation. He is now represented in one of the stained glass windows in the Grote Kerk, in Dordrecht.

== In exile ==
After he was dismissed in February 1619 by the Utrecht authorities from his post, Niellius was banished on 6 July from Waalwijk. He took part in the expatriate Remonstrant Brotherhood founded by Nicolaas Grevinckhoven, Johannes Wtenbogaert, Johannes Arnoldi Corvinus and others. With Willem Lomannus he looked into the opportunity offered in Holstein for the foundation of a Remonstrant settlement.

== In prison ==
With Eduardus Poppius he was betrayed and arrested in January 1623 in Haarlem; and he was imprisoned in Loevestein from 1623 to 1631. Poppius died there. On 19 July 1631 the group of Remonstrant ministers in the castle were in effect released, with an arrangement that they were to be allowed to escape. The reconstruction of a Remonstrant church followed shortly in The Hague. The other six released with Niellius were: Theodorus Boomius (Dirk Boom), Simon Lucae Bysterus, Petrus Cupus, Arnoldus Geesteranus, Paulus Lindenius, and Bernardus Vezekius.

== In Amsterdam ==
Niellius returned to the service of the Remonstrants, and was employed from 1 March 1632 in Amsterdam as the first pastor of that newly formed congregation. He took on inspection of churches, and the supervision and instruction of Remonstrant students. When Simon Episcopius died, Étienne de Courcelles eventually succeeded him, in the chair at the Remonstrant seminary; but there was a transitional committee including Niellius who eventually retired in 1649 from both posts (pastor and professor), with Albertus Huttenus and Bartholomaeus Praevostius.

== Works ==
He translated into French as Balance pour peser en toute équité the anonymous pamphlet in Dutch Weegh-Schael (1617, by Jacobus Taurinus). It was an attack on Sir Dudley Carleton's intervention in the politics of the Netherlands on the side of the contra-Remonstrants and Maurice of Nassau. Niellius added a satirical introduction and portrait of Carleton.

When Fabrice de la Bassecour succeeded Simon Goulart the Younger as pastor at the Walloon church in Amsterdam, it was by attacking Goulart on theological grounds (1616). In return Niellius published a crude Vérification against Bassecour, in 1618.

He published many works against Voetius and religious persecution under pseudonyms Clivensis, Cleef, Clever, Andries of Sr van Cleef.
