= Herman Herbers =

Dutch pastor and theologian

Herman Herbers (Groenlo, 1540 or 1544- Gouda, February 23, 1607) was a Dutch pastor and theologian.

== Biography ==
Herbers was born in Groenlo in 1540 or 1544 as the son of Roman Catholic parents. He was educated in a monastery. He joined the Mariengarden Monastery of the order of the Cistercians in Gross-Burlo, near Winterswijk.

In 1566 he was appointed deputy to the pastor of Winterswijk, who died to the plague. Herbers developed sympathy for the ideas of Erasmus and for Protestantism. He settled in Bocholt, Germany, where a Protestant-friendly climate prevailed. Herbers married Ermken Dircks Raesveltsdr.

He was appointed preacher of the new doctrine in 1569, but was deposed in 1570 by the bishop of Münster and Osnabrück. Despite the support that Herbers received from the city council and the population, he was expelled from the diocese.

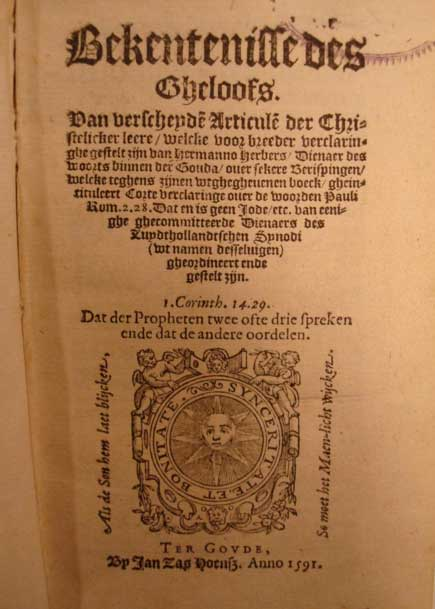
Bekentenisse des gheloofs by Herman Herbers (1591)

Herbers then established himself as a Lutheran minister in Wesel where he wrote a creed. In 1577 he accepted an appeal to the Reformed Churches in Dordrecht. Already during his ministry of Dordrecht, he was loaned to other cities including Antwerp, Gouda and Mechelen. Gradually, Herbers developed into an open-minded pastor, who developed an understanding for dissenters. This brought him into conflict with both the local authorities in Dordrecht and the church council. He was dismissed as a preacher by the city council of Dordrecht in 1582. He was also not issued a certificate to his new municipality of Gouda.

Despite this lack of cooperation by the Dordrecht authorities, he was received with open arms in Gouda by the Gouda city council and the church council there. Herbers is said to be Pastor of Gouda for a period of 25 years. He was given the opportunity to put his non-conformist views into practice. Despite objections from the ecclesiastical authorities, Herbers refused to teach the catechism.

From 1591 to 1593, Herbers was declared suspended by the synod, but nevertheless maintained by the Gouda authorities as pastor of the Sint-Janskerk. Herbers' religious views were echoed in Gouda, among other things, in the work of his son the preacher Dirck Herbers and the preachers Harboldus Tombergen and Eduard Poppius.

They were followers of Jacobus Arminius and in 1610 co-signatories of the Remonstrance. Herbers is considered one of the Arminian forerunners of the Remonstrants. His writings testify also to a mystical or experimental experience of faith. He died in February 1607 at the age of 66 in Gouda.

== Works ==
Herbers and his son Dirck are also seen as the co-authors of :

- Short education of the children in the Christian religion
- The so-called
- De Goudse Catechismus
- A textbook for the youth

== Notes and references ==
=== Sources ===
- Plaizier, Kees (2011). Herman Herbers, Gouds predikant van 1582-1607. Een mystieke weg (in Dutch). Gouda: Historische Vereniging Die Goude.
- Goudse Canon (2020). "De Goudse Catechismus - Gouds kerkelijk leerboekje". goudsecanon.nl (in Dutch).
- Groot, A. de (1988). "Herberts, Herman". Biografisch lexicon voor de geschiedenis van het Nederlands protestantisme (in Dutch). Vol. 3. pp. 178–181.
