= Johannes Narssius =

Dutch physician and poet (1580–1637)

Johannes Narssius (9 November 1580 – 1637) was a Dutch physician and Neo-Latin poet, initially a Remonstrant minister.

== Life ==
He was born Johan van Naars(s)en in Dordrecht on 9 November 1580, and studied philosophy and theology at the University of Leiden. He may have lived in the house of Gerardus Vossius in 1602. A disciple of Jacobus Arminius, his theological beliefs came into question in 1605. In one of the early Leiden debates involving Arminius, he responded to Johannes Kuchlinus.

Narssius was a subscriber to the Confessio orthodoxa of Conrad Vorstius, successor to Arminius at Leiden, and was strongly reprimanded for that by the Synod of Harderwijk. He was pastor at Grave and then Zaltbommel, but lost his posts because of his combative Remonstrant approach. He reportedly travelled to England to present Arminian documents to Archbishop George Abbot, meeting a very hostile reception. After the general exile of Remonstrants from the Netherland he was at the Arminian colony of Friedrichstadt in Holstein.

He spent time in Poland, and Sweden, where he was court poet. In Riga he knew Rütger Hemsing (1604–1643), another physician-poet, and an associate of Galileo. He corresponded with Ole Worm on archaeology. Under the name Hans van der Ast he took letters from Frederick V, Elector Palatine in Germany to his wife Elizabeth of Bohemia, who was in The Hague.

Returning to the Netherlands, he took a position with the Dutch East India Company. He travelled to the Indies, where he died.

== Works ==
Narssius belonged to the "Dordrecht School" of Latin poets, which included also the Remonstrant Samuel Naeranus. He is remembered for Gustavidos sive de bello Sueco-austriaco libri tres 1632) and Gustavidos liber quartus (1634), published in Hamburg, which were Latin epic poems. He also wrote a tragedy Gustavus saucius (1629 and 1632) on Gustavus Adolphus, for whom he was physician and historiographer, from 1625 or 1626.

Other poetical works were:

- Prosopopoeia Hamburgi (1623)
- Poëmata septentrionalia aliaque nonulla miscellanea (1624)
- Fides et humanitas Polonica erga delegatos regios Suedorum (Riga, 1625)
- Riga devicta ab Augustissimo principe Gustavo Adolpho (Riga, 1625)
- Meva Pomerelliae obsidione Polonorum liberata ductu augustissimi Sueciae &c. regis Gustavi Adolphi (Stockholm, 1627)

An epitaph of his was collected in Robert Monro, Monro his Expedition with the Worthy Scots Regiment. It was for John Sinclair, third son of George Sinclair, 5th Earl of Caithness, killed at Newmarke in the Palatinate, in 1632.
