= Arnoldus Clapmarius =

German academic, jurist and humanist

Arnoldus Clapmarius (real surname Klapmeier, also known as Arnold Clapmar) (1574–1604) was a German academic, jurist and humanist, known for his writings on statecraft.

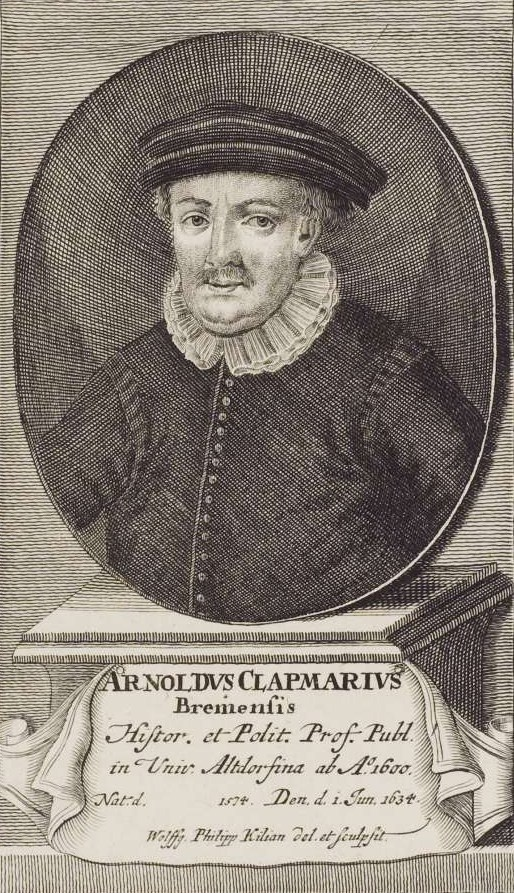
Arnoldus Clapmarius, 1728 engraving

== Life ==
He was born in Bremen. He studied from 1591 to 1595 at Helmstedt, Heidelberg and Marburg, travelled, and then became tutor to the son of Eberhard von Weyhe. He was appointed successor to Christoph Coler at Altdorf by Moritz of Hesse-Kassel, as professor of history and politics; he died four years later.

He died in Nuremberg.

== Works ==
Clapmarius was an early contributor to public law as academic disciple. He attempted a synthesis of historical knowledge, neo-stoicism, and the works of Tacitus.

His papers were edited by his brother Johannes (1605), who published the major book De arcanis rerum publicarum libri sex; there were later editions by Johannes Arnoldi Corvinus (1641), and Martinus Schoock (1668, 1672). Clapmarius took the ideas of Scipione Ammirato derived from Tacitus, and combined them with Aristotle's taxonomy of constitutions. He wrote of the arcana dominationis and jus dominationis proper to types of constitution, the latter being a nuanced version of reason of state; in his Conclusiones de jure publico (1602) he had identified the arcana dominationis with the Italian ragion di stato, but now argued that the jus dominationis was the statesman's privilege to work outside the normal legal framework (while disclaiming Machiavellianism). He claimed to extract from Tacitus the secrets (arcana) of retention of power as employed by the Roman emperors.

The ideas of Clapmarius proved influential. He was the first to connect in detail the ragion di stato with the classical vocabulary of Aristotle and Tacitus. Gabriel Naudé took directly from him in a conception of the coup d'état. His work also attracted much attention in the Netherlands in the middle of the 17th century among those concerned to limit state power; the Bedekte konsten (Hidden Arts) (1657) of Gerard van Wassenaer, and almost identical Nauwkeurige consideratie van staet (Close Consideration of the State) (1662) attributed to Pieter de la Court, were heavily influenced by Clapmarius.

Another work was Nobilis adolescentis triennium, first published in Christian Becmann's Manuductio ad Latinam linguam (1611) and often reprinted. In it Clapmarius made the humanist case for mastery of the Latin language, as preparation for a career for example in diplomacy or the law.
