= Dominicus Sapma =

16th–17th century Dutch Protestant Reformed clergyman

Dominicus Sapma (1586–1635) was a Dutch Protestant Reformed clergyman during the Eighty Years' War. He was one of the prominent Remonstrants who were summoned to the Dordrecht Synod in 1618–19.

== Biography ==
Sapma was born in Amsterdam. After studying at the University of Leiden and his first pastorate in Ter Aar (1610), Sapma was appointed pastor to Hoorn in 1614, where he succeeded a Remonstrant clergyman and was involved in the disputes between Franciscus Gomarus and the followers of Jacobus Arminius (Remonstrants), who died in 1609, became active. Since Sapma was known as a sharp Remonstrant polemicist, his summons to the Dordrecht Synod in 1618 was foreseeable. While he was in Dordrecht, he learned that his pregnant wife, Grietje Ulbeshad been expelled from the rectory in Hoorn. Sapma then left the synod on his own initiative to help his wife in Hoorn. But he had to return to Dordrecht; his expulsion from Hoorn was accompanied by serious unrest among the population, resulting in dead and wounded people.

As with the other prominent remonstrators, Sapma's conviction in Dordrecht in 1619 was followed by expulsion from the Netherlands. But he only stayed in Waalwijk for a short time and then returned to the Netherlands, where he lived underground in different places. On August 28, 1628, he was captured in Amsterdam and interrogated several times in the city prison under threat of torture; he refused to give the authorities information about the Remonstrant underground organization. His steadfastness earned him respect and, as a result, relief from his imprisonment: his wife was allowed to visit him. By changing clothes with Grietje Ulbes, he was able to escape from prison; Ulbes, who remained behind in her husband's place, was released shortly afterwards. 'Droeve gevanckenisse and blijde uytkomst). He continued to live underground until his death and helped escape other Remonstrants, Johannes Grevius and S. Prince, who were imprisoned in Amsterdam. He died in 1635 in Hoorn.
