= Wilhelm Fridolin Volkmann =

Austrian philosopher and psychologist

- Born: 25 September 1822; Prague, Austrian Empire
- Died: 13 January 1877 (aged 54); Malá Strana, Prague, Austria-Hungary

Education
- Education: Charles University in Prague

Wilhelm Fridolin Volkmann [later the title Ritter von Volkmar was appended to his name] (25 September 1821 – 13 January 1877) was an Austrian philosopher and psychologist.

== Biography ==
He was born and educated in Prague. In 1846 he became a lecturer in aesthetics, afterwards in philosophy, at the University of Prague, and in 1856 was appointed to a professorship in philosophy there. His chief studies were in the exact psychology of the school of Herbart, for whose general principles Volkmann was probably the most conspicuous expounder.

Volkmann's most important publication is the Lehrbuch der Psychologie vom Standpunkte des philosophischen Realismus (Treatise on Psychology from the Standpoint of Philosophical Realism, 1856; 4th ed., by Cornelius, 1894–95). In its first edition it was called Grundriss ... (Outline ...).
