= Johannes Crucius =

Dutch theologian (1560–1625)

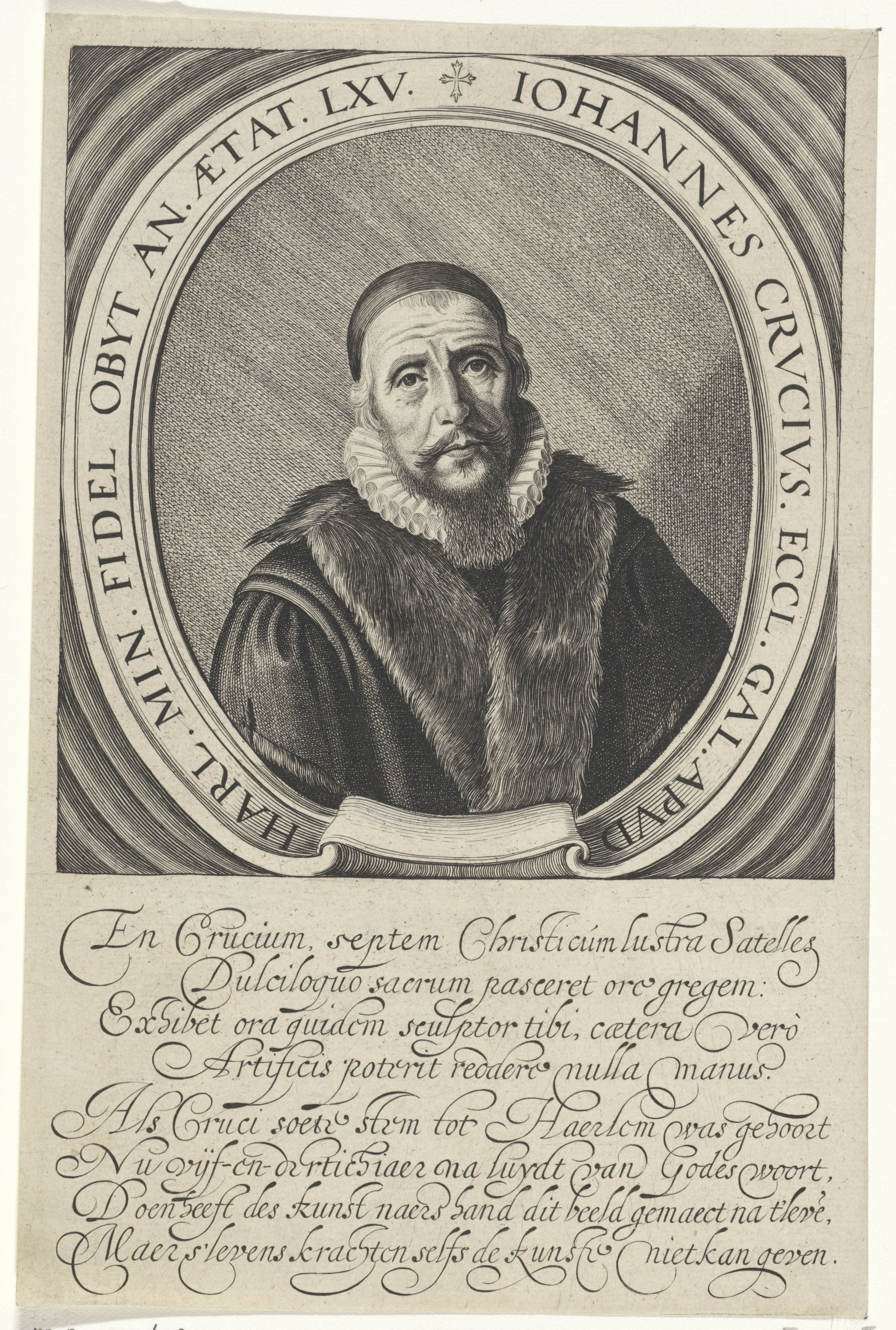
Engraved portrait by Jan van de Velde of Johannes Crucius after Frans Hals

Johannes Crucius, or Jean de la Croix (1560 – 1625), was a Dutch theologian.

== Biography ==
He was born in Lille, France, as the son of Jacobus de la Croix, a Walloon preacher of Middelburg, among other cities. He was the brother of Jacobus Crucius. Crucius studied in Geneva, and graffiti on the epitaph of Erasmus of Rotterdam in Basel Minster still testifies of his stay in Switzerland. On 28 September 1586 he matriculated at Heidelberg University, a year after Franciscus Gomarus, along with the students Abrahamus Vandermylen of Dordrecht, Meinardus ab Idzaerda of Friesland, and Andreas ab Hiddema of Friesland. He then matriculated at Leiden in 1589 and the following year he was selected to succeed Jean Taffin as Walloon preacher at the Waalse Kerk, Haarlem, where he is buried.

He married Elisabeth Stoock and their first child was baptised 7 June 1591. Their son Jacobus became a doctor, and their sons Nicolaas (1595–1643) and Johannes (1598–1666) became preachers like their father. From 1592, Crucius was the representative of the Wallonian church at the Walloon Synod in Middelburg and in 1618 and 1619 he was their representative at the Synod of Dort. He is known for his translations of religious works From Latin and Dutch into French, most notably by Antonius Walaeus. He died in Haarlem.

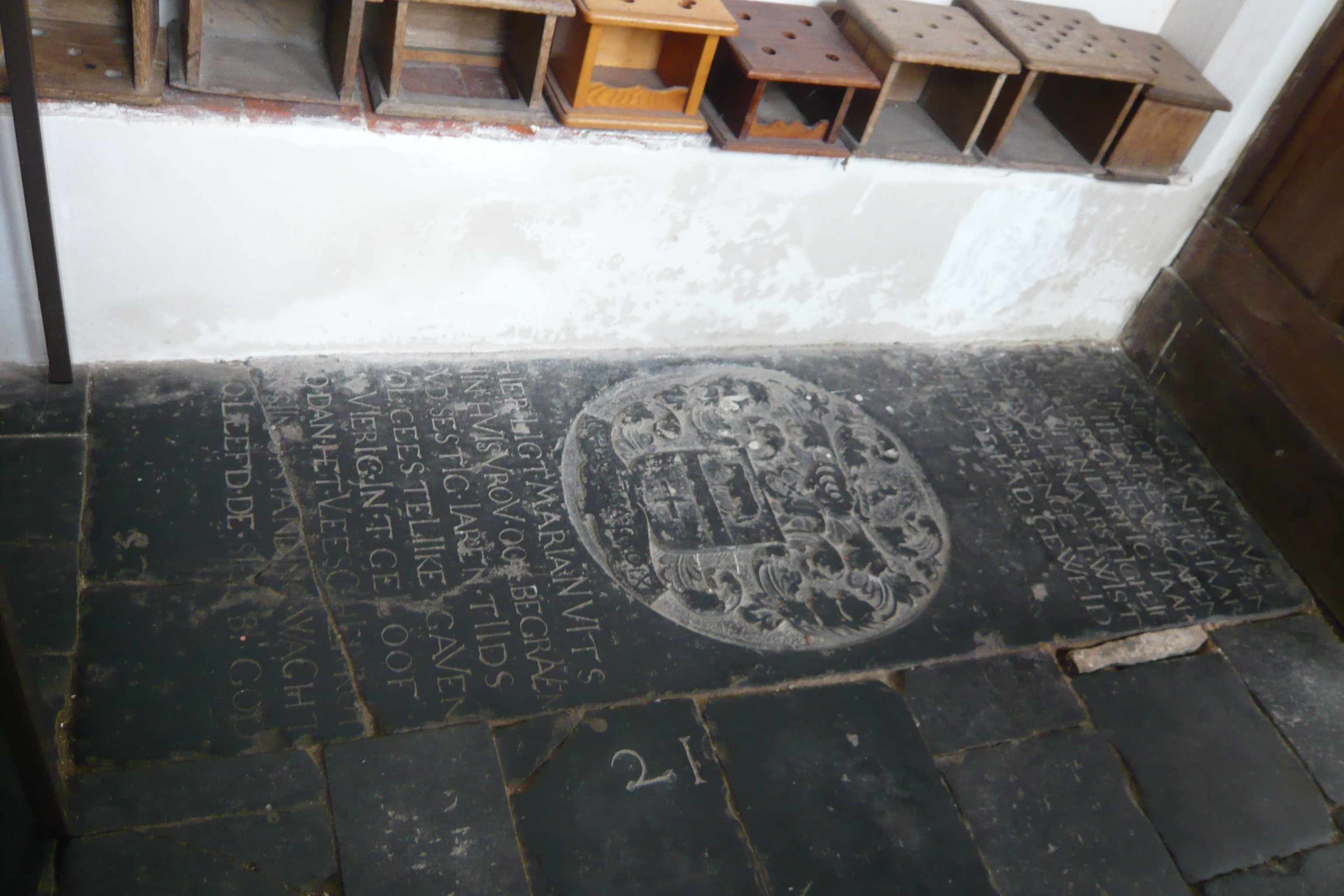
Grave of Johannes Crucius and his wife Maria adorned with his family shield showing a cow above a cross, located in the Waalse Kerk, Haarlem

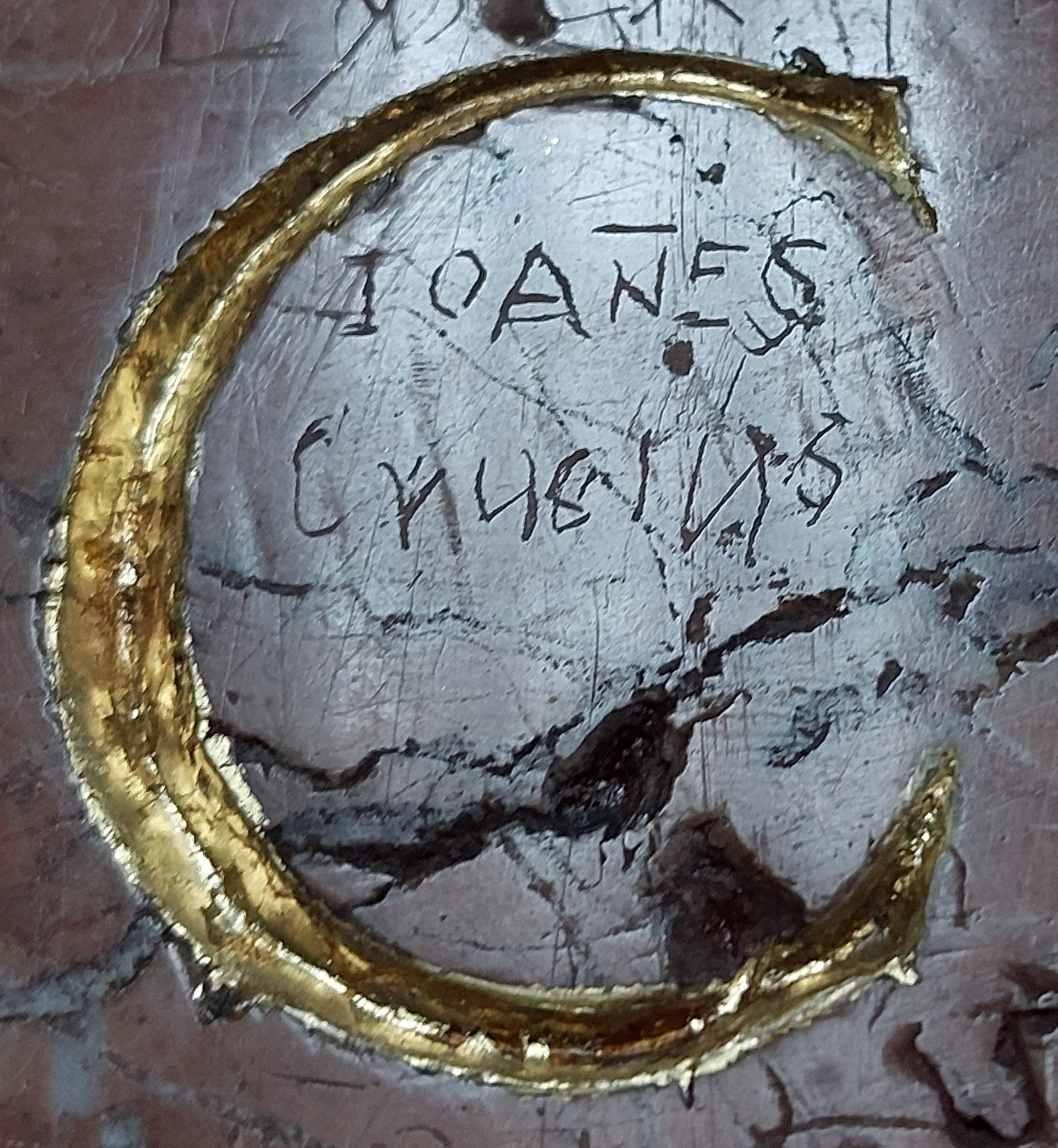
Crucius' graffiti on the epitaph of Erasmus of Rotterdam in Basel Minster
