= Samuel Naeranus =

Dutch Remonstrant minister and Neo-Latin poet

Samuel Naeranus (1582–1641) was a Dutch Remonstrant minister and Neo-Latin poet, exiled in 1619 after the Synod of Dort.

== Life ==
He was born in Dordrecht, where his father Servatius was a preacher, and attended the Latin school there under Rekenarius, moving to Amsterdam when his teacher did. He studied at Saumur Academy and then at the Academy of Sedan, where he was rector of the Latin school from 1608 to 1610. At Sedan Meric Casaubon was his pupil.

He was minister of Hazerswoude, in 1613, when he made the French translation of the Ordinum Pietas of Hugo Grotius. He witnessed with other ministers disputations in 1614 and 1615 between Jan Geesteran and Conrad Vorstius. At the time of his exile he was minister at Amersfoort, where he had moved in 1617. He participated in the Synod of Dort, where he complained during the 46th and 54th sessions of the injustice of the Remonstrants not being allowed to present their own views.

Exiled, Naeranus initially went to Antwerp, where the Remonstrants were regrouping. In 1623 he was at Rostock, and was invited by Martin Ruar to move to Danzig. He was there at a merchants' church until 1631. He then moved back to Amersfoort.

== Works ==
At Sedan in 1606 he published a Disputatio de libera voluntate, which he translated from Latin to Dutch and published in 1611 as Dispvtatie van de vrye wille. His Onderwysinge in de Christelijcke religie was the first short Remonstrant catechism, and reached a fourth edition in 1664 (Rotterdam); it was subjected to criticism by Abraham Heidanus, and supported by Simon Episcopius. In exile in Danzig he published Senatus Gedanensis anagrammaticus (1632).

== Family ==
Johannes Naeranus (1608–1679) was his son with his wife Maria Junius, daughter of Franciscus Junius the Elder. Samuel helped Franciscus Junius the Younger with translation from Greek for his De pictura veterum (1637).
