= Daniel Angelocrator =

German Reformed minister

Daniel Angelocrator (1569 – 1635), real surname Engelhardt, was a German Reformed minister.

== Life ==
Daniel Angelocrator was born Daniel Engelhardt on 19 October 1569 in Korbach, in the Landgraviate of Hesse-Kassel.

He studied theology at the University of Marburg and the University of Franeker from 1588 to 1589. Early in his career, he worked as a tutor, accompanying two young aristocrats during their studies at Marburg and Helmstedt.

In 1594, a disagreement with his father over his Calvinist beliefs led him to leave home. He moved to Geneva, where he stayed with a former pupil.

== Career ==
After returning from Switzerland in the late 16th century, Angelocrator entered the ministry in Germany, serving in Hesse-Kassel. In 1607, he was appointed Archdeacon of Marburg by Maurice, Landgrave of Hesse-Kassel, the ruler of the territory.

By 1618, he was a delegate to the Synod of Dort, an international assembly of Reformed church leaders.

The outbreak of the Thirty Years' War in 1618 disrupted his career. By the mid-1620s, he had been forced to leave Hesse-Kassel and became minister of Gudensberg. In 1626, he was dispossessed when Imperial troops sacked the town. The following year, in 1627, he relocated to Köthen.

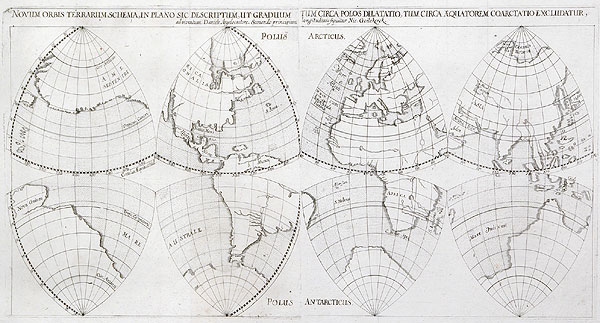
World map by Daniel Angelocrator from his book Novum Orbis Terrarum Schema, in Plano sic Descriptum, using a projection of his own invention.

== Works ==
Angelocrator is known, alongside his ministry, for his work as a chronologist and cartographer. In 1601, he published Chronologia Autoptica, a chronological work that drew on the writings of the Italian scholar Annius of Viterbo, whose works were later shown to be forgeries.

In 1617, he published Doctrina de ponderibus, monetis et mensuris per totum terrarum orbem usitatis, a treatise on weights, measures, and coinage used in different parts of the world, which was expanded in a later edition of 1628.

The expanded 1628 edition included a world map, Novum orbis terrarum schema, in plano sic descriptum, illustrating a projection of the spherical earth onto a flat surface. The map emphasized the general outlines of the continents rather than detailed place names. He designed the projection himself and based the geographical content of the map on the work of the cartographer Nicolaes van Geelkercken.

== Death ==
He died in 1635 in Köthen, then part of the Principality of Anhalt-Köthen.
