= Georg Cruciger =

German Calvinist theologian and linguist

Georg Cruciger (also Creuziger, Kreuziger) (1575–1637) was a German Calvinist theologian and linguist.

== Life ==
He was born in Merseburg, son of Caspar Cruciger the Younger.

Cruciger taught theology at Marburg. He was one of the representatives of Hesse-Kassel at the Synod of Dort 1618-9

In 1624 he was dismissed from Marburg, with the other theologians Johannes Crocius and Caspar Sturm, as a result of religious changes in Hesse.

== Works ==
His Harmonia linguarum (1616), dedicated to Maurice, Landgrave of Hesse-Kassel, was a language harmony that listed over 2000 Hebrew roots and asserted derivatives in Latin, Greek and German (High German and some Dutch).
