= Eduard Poppius =

Dutch pastor and theologian

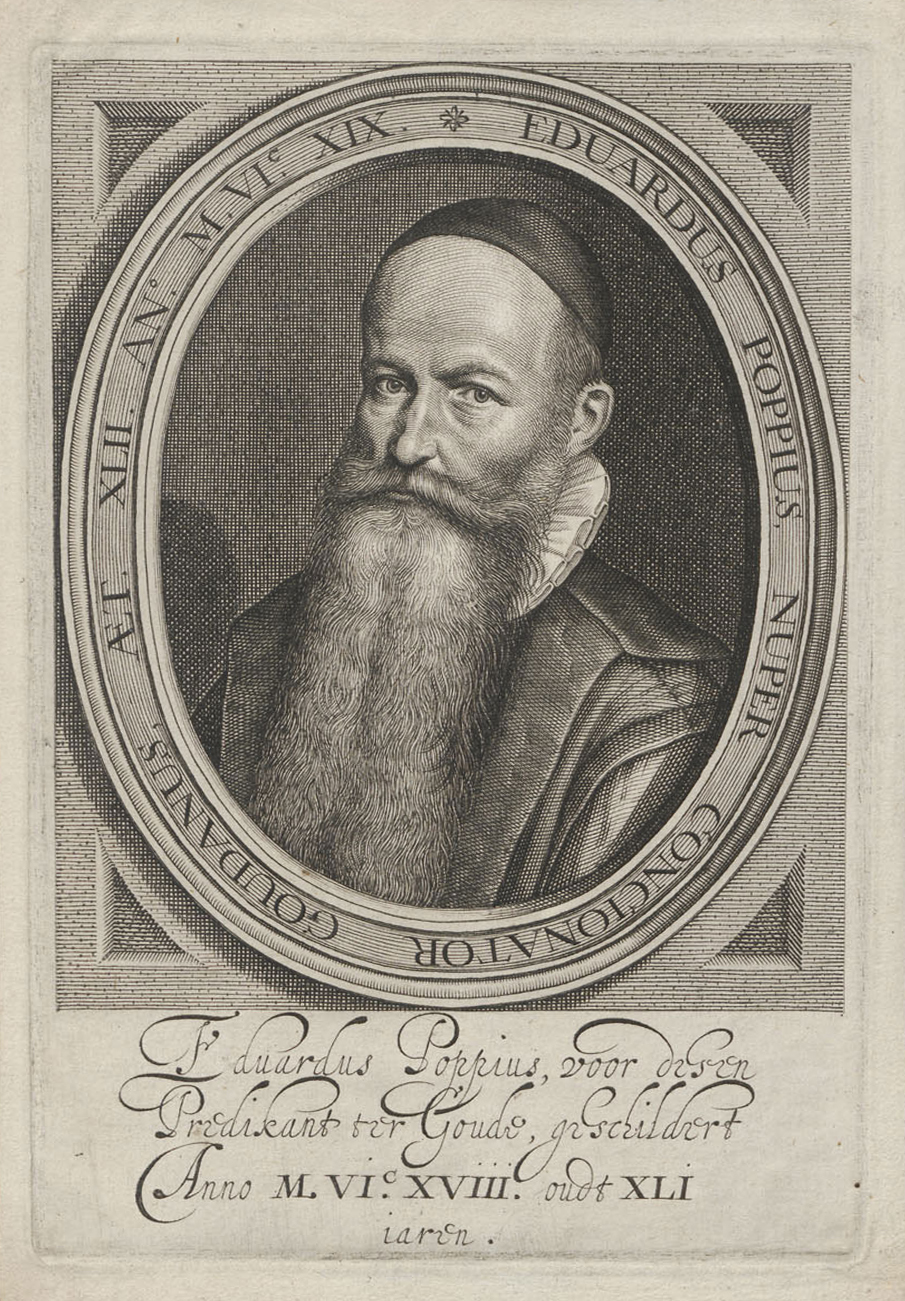

Personal life
- Born: c. 1575; Enkhuizen
- Died: 9 March 1624; Loevestein Castle

Religious life
- Religion: Remonstrants

Eduard Poppius (Enkhuizen, 1576/1577 - Loevestein, March 9, 1624) was a Dutch pastor and theologian. He was one of the founders of the Remonstrant Brotherhood and a participant to the Synod of Dordrecht.

== Biography ==
Poppius was a son of the pastor Pieter Eduardsz Poppius. He studied theology at Leiden University. After his studies, he became a minister in Amstelveen in 1599. From 1609 to 1619 he was a minister of the Reformed Church of Gouda. He was appointed in Gouda because of his choice for the Arminian ideas of Jacobus Arminius, who rejected the doctrine of double predestination.

In 1610, Poppius was one of the signatories of the Remonstrance, in which the followers of Arminius called on the States of Holland to help them in their struggles within the Reformed Church. At the National Synod of Dordrecht in 1618/1619, the views of the Remonstrants were condemned, after which their representatives - including Poppius - were sent out to the meeting. They were exiled from the Republic and brought on farm carts to Waalwijk, which was then under Spanish authority.

In 1619, Poppius was one of the founders of the Remonstrant Brotherhood in Antwerp and was appointed one of the six directors of the brotherhood. He nevertheless returned to Gouda and held church services there, both in secret churches and in open air assemblies. In Gouda, the moderate bailiff Schaep was replaced in November 1620 by Anthony Cloots. He fanatically hunted the Remonstrants. Poppius had fear for his arrest after 800 guilders were promised for his arrest. His wife was also denied access to the city.

In 1623 he was captured in Haarlem and taken to the Loevestein castle, because of an alleged complicity in plotting an attack on Maurice, Prince of Orange. He died in captivity there the following year.

== Bibliography ==
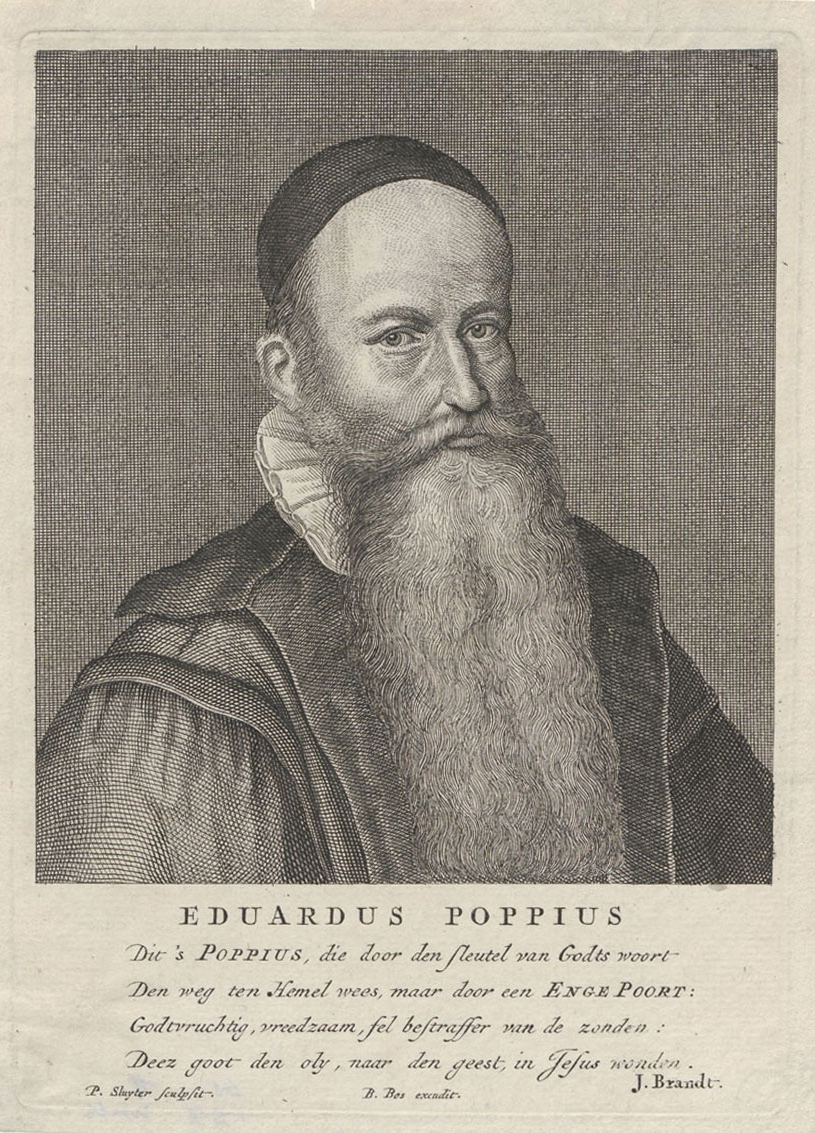
Eduard Poppius by Pieter Sluyter (1704)

- De Enge Poorte, ofte, Predicatien Over eenighe voortreffelijcke Texten, ofte Spreucken der heyligher Schrifture, uitg. Jasper Tournay, Gouda, 1616 (herdrukken in 1630 en 1649) + Aenhanghsel vande Enge-poort, 1624
- Ontdeckinghe van den oproerighen gheest der Contra-Remonstrantsghesinden .., 1618
- Ghebedt der verdrvckte ende bedroefde Ghemeente Iesu Christi inde Vereenichde Nederlanden ende voornemel_ck inde Prouincien van Hollant. Tot Godt ende den Vader Iesu Christi, 1619
- Christelicke vermaninghe vande ghetrouwe herders (teghenwoordigh uytlanch sijnde) aen haer bedruckte gemeente, 1619
- Troosteliick Nieuwe-Jaer, den christelijcken gemeynten der remonstranten die inde vereenichde Neder-landen vervolghinghe lijden, toeghesonden van weghen hare herders ende leeraers, om voorstant van waerheydt ende van vrheyt der conscientie in ballinghschap verdreven zijnde, 1620
- Antwoordt op de malitieuse calumnie der contra-remonstranten in de Vereenichde Nederlanden. Daer mede sy, oorsake nemende uyt verscheyden andere ongefundeerde redenen ... als oockuyt de schandelijcke afval Petri Bertii, de remonstrantsche predicanten ... valschelijck beschuldighen, dat sy papisten zijn .., 1620
- Nievwe-iaer vervatende stoffe tot goede ende vreedsame bedenckinghen ende raetpleginghen over religions saken in dese bedroefde tijden: voor magistraten, leeraers ende gemeene ingesetene vande vereenighde Nederlanden, 1621
- Aenwijsinghe vande groote ende grove mis-slaghen .., 1622
- Christeliicke gebeden ten dienste van crancke persoonen, die boetvaerdigh zijn ende in Christum ghelooven, so om voor ende met hunlieden van andere; als oock om van haer selven gedaen te worden, 1624 (herdruk in 1628)
- Siecken-troost, dat is: Aensprake, onderwijsinghe ende vermaninghe aen de crancke luyden van allerley soorten onder de Christenen, gherichtet nae den staet vande wandelinghe, diese elck, gheduyrende hare gesontheyt, geleyt hebben ..., 1625 (reprints in 1626 and 1648)
- Verklaringhe over de woorden dees H. Evangelist Matthei XVIII. vers. 7, 1626
- Handt-boecxken van de gheboden Godes, Amsterdam, 1627
- Kleynoodt vervatende eenige schriftjens D. Eduardi Poppii saliger dewelcke nae s_n overl_den gevonden z_nde, ofte hier ende daer onder verscheyden vrienden verstrooyt, nu hier in een bondel te samen z_n gebracht, ende tot stichtinge van veele in druck uytgegeven, Amsterdam, 1647
- Historisch verhael van 'tgene tusschen den synodo nationaal ende de geciteerde remonsranten is ende buyten de synodale vergaderinghe is ghepasseert : met een voor-reden dienende tot wechneminge van scheuringhe, Amsterdam, 1649

With others:

- Theses theologicæ complectentes primæ quæstionis in cathechesi Hollandicarum ecclesiarum analysin & explicationem : disputatæ sub præsidio, Leiden, 1598
- Theses theologicæ de Evangelio, Leiden, 1599
- Cort ende grondich bericht voor alle eenvoudighe ende godtlievende menschen, om haer van de leere, die in den Dordtschen Synodo ghearresteert is, ende van de Contra-Remonstranten ghedreven wordt, een afschrick te hebben, 1625

== Historical novel ==
In 2006 the historical novel Titia and the Pastor: a historical story about religion, hate and love was published by Dick Jonker and with the collaboration of Marlies Temmink-Hos about the life of Poppius in Gouda. This publication was co-produced with the collaboration of the Remonstrant Municipality of Gouda.

== Notes and references ==
=== Sources ===
- Duersen, A. Th. (1978). "Popius Eduard". Biografisch lexicon voor de geschiedenis van het Nederlands protestantisme (in Dutch). Vol. 1. p. 260.
- Knipscheer (1921). "Popius Eduard". Nieuw Nederlandsch Biografisch Woordenboek (NNBW) (in Dutch). Vol. 5. Leiden: Sijthoff. p. 531.
- Walvis, Ignatius (1999). Goudsche onkatolijke kerkzaken (in Dutch). Delft: Uitgeverij Eburon.
