= Johannes Arnoldi Corvinus =

Johannes Arnoldi Corvinus born Joannes Arnoldsz Ravens (c.1582, Leiden – 2 January 1650, Amsterdam) was a Dutch Remonstrant minister, theologian, and jurist.

== Life ==
He was born in Leiden, and in 1606 was a Calvinist preacher there. A pupil of Jacobus Arminius, he took up the Arminian views, he was a public supporter of them by 1609, and in 1610 signed the Five Articles of Remonstrance. Subsequently, as a consequence of the Synod of Dort, he lost his church office in 1619. He left the country, being abroad until 1630. Studying law, he then had a career as advocate in Amsterdam. The details surrounding his conversion to Roman Catholicism late in life are unclear and debated. In a letter to Johannes Uytenbogaert on May 14, 1629, he expressed that if there are rumors “that I would become Catholic, then those reasons should be properly understood.” Reports from 1630 suggest that he may have had inclinations toward Catholicism, which led to concern and even some mockery from his Remonstrant peers. In 1649, just days before his death, he declared his conversion to Catholicism, stating that, after “sharp investigation,” he had concluded that the “Catholic, Apostolic, Roman religion” was the true path to salvation. This declaration, allegedly made in the presence of two witnesses, was documented in a letter to his son, but was only preserved through Philipp van Limborch, a secondary source. The motivations behind this conversion remain contested. From what we know, his conversion was likely related to the twin forces of disillusionment caused by schisms within the Reformed tradition and a shift towards Tridentine theology on matters such as justification, sacramentology, and the role of tradition. He could also maintain his views on predestination, free will, and grace, given that Molinism was alive and well, especially after the De Auxiliis controversy came to a close in 1607. It is also known that his son was a Roman Catholic, and with that, converting would provide spiritual comfort and personal assurance. It is also important to note that in John McClintock and James Strong’s Cyclopedia of Biblical, Theological, and Ecclesiastical Literature, they said that Corvinus “is often confounded with his son, Corvinus of Beldern, who embraced Catholicism,” so, once more, it is difficult to come to a certain conclusion on this matter.

== Works ==
Theological writings

- Christelicke ende ernstighe vermaninghe tot vrede aen R. Donteclock (1609), against Reinier Donteclock
- Teghen-bericht jeghens D. Francisci Gomari (1610), against Franciscus Gomarus
- Responsio ad Bogermanni adnotationes, pro Grotio (1613), reply to Johannes Bogermann
- Censura anatomes Arminianismi etc. (1614), against Pierre du Moulin
- Petri Molinaei novi anatomici mala encheiresis (1622). Reply to Du Moulin's Anatome Arminianismi (1619). This work follows Hugo Grotius on the Ten Commandments, suggesting they are divine positive law, rather than the law of nature.

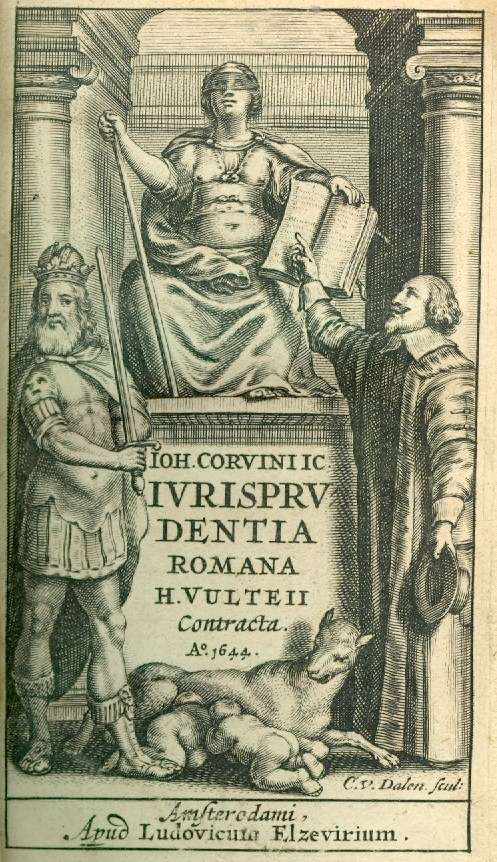
Title page from Jurisprudentia romana H[ermanni] Vulteii contracta (1644), a summary of a work by Hermann Vultejus (1555-1634)

Legal writings

Corvinus had been quite close to Grotius, in the 1610s, and from around 1632 taught the law. With Gerard de Wassenaer and Pieter de la Court he was one of a group of legal writers with Remonstrant sympathies who commented on reason of state; Corvinus did this in an edition of the De arcanis rerumpublicarum of Arnoldus Clapmarius (1641). Other works were:

- Posthumus Pacianus (1643) on Giulio Pace
- Jurisprudentia romana (1644)
- Conclusiones de ivre pvblico (1644) with Arnoldus Clapmarius, Christoph Besold, and Franciscus Rosellus
- Enchiridium seu institutiones imperiales (1649)
- Jus canonicum per aphorismos strictim explicatum (1648)

== Family ==
His son Arendt became a professor of law at Mainz.
