= Johannes Wtenbogaert =

Dutch Protestant minister

Johannes Wtenbogaert (Also Jan or Hans, Uytenbogaert or Uitenbogaert.) (11 February 1557 – 4 September 1644) was a Dutch Protestant minister, a leader of the Remonstrants.

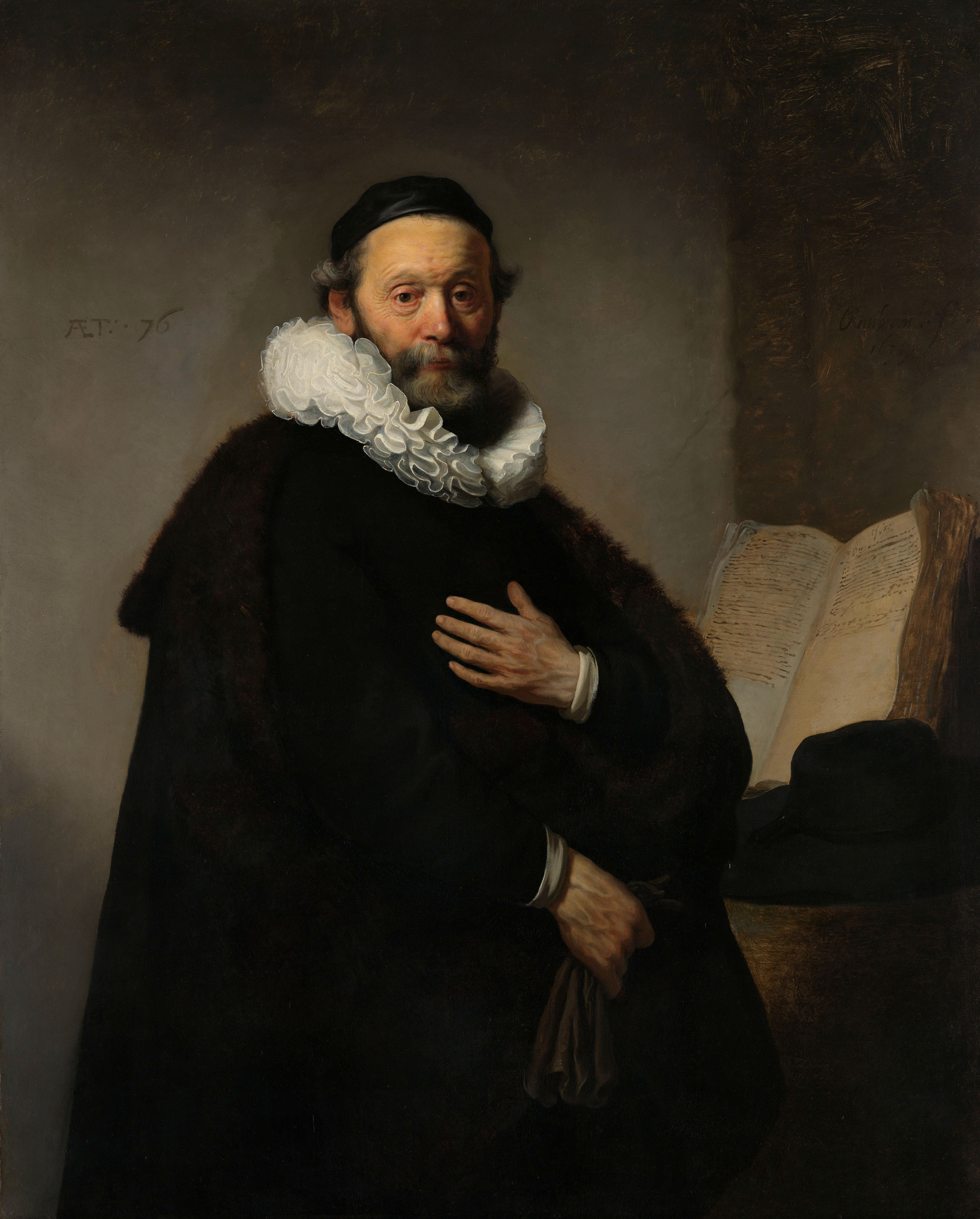
1633 portrait of Johannes Wtenbogaert by Rembrandt.

== Life ==
Born at Utrecht, he was brought up a Roman Catholic, and attended the school of St. Jerome there. He intended a legal career, but gave it up from 1578 with Catholicism when required to cease hearing the sermons of the evangelical Huibert Duifhuis (1531–1581). He went to Arnhem and the service of Count John of Nassau, and then returned to Utrecht to become a pastor. He found conflict between Duifhuis and a group of Calvinists called Consistorials.

In 1580 Wtenbogaert was sent at the city's expense to study theology in Geneva and came into contact with Theodore Beza; but his sympathies were with Jacobus Arminius. On his return to Utrecht in 1584 he found himself in an awkward position in the continuing discord. Eventually in 1590 the magistrates removed the preachers from both sides.

He then went to The Hague, invited by Maurice of Nassau, and the Walloon congregation there, in 1591. He was in favour, and also attracted the attention of Johan van Oldenbarnevelt. Influential, he became the leader of the Arminian party of Remonstrants, after the death of Arminius in 1609; in fact the name was taken from the Remonstrance of 14 January 1610 to the States of Holland, masterminded by Wtenbogaert and Oldenbarnevelt. At the same time Wtenbogaert published his Tractaet, causing a controversy and, despite the conferences of 1611 and 1613, an effective schism with the Calvinist or Gomarist Counter-Remonstrant party.

Prince Maurice removed support from Wtenbogaert, and in 1617 the States decided for a synod, against the wish of the Remonstrants. Wtenbogaert lost heart in March 1618, and asked to be relieved of his charge; and when on 29 August 1618, Oldenbarnevelt, Hugo Grotius, and Rombout Hogerbeets were arrested, Wtenbogaert fled to Rotterdam and then to Antwerp. On 24 May 1619 he was banned from the Dutch Republic and his goods confiscated, the reason given being that he had introduced new views, contrary to the accepted Reformed theology. In October he sent a document to Prince Maurice in his defense, and continued to direct the affairs of the Remonstrants. In October 1621, he moved to Rouen.

When Maurice died in 1625, and was succeeded as stadtholder by Wtenbogaert's pupil Frederick Henry, Prince of Orange, Wtenbogaert returned in September 1626. But Frederick Henry would not openly support the Remonstrants, though he granted protection to his old teacher. Wtenbogaert began to preach quietly at The Hague, and regained possession of his house. For the rest of his life he worked for his cause by his writings and by personal efforts. In particular he wrote an autobiography and a work of church history. He died at The Hague in 1644.
