= Alma Academia Leidensis =

Book about professors of the University of Leiden

Illustrium Hollandiae & VVestfrisiae ordinum alma Academia Leidensis
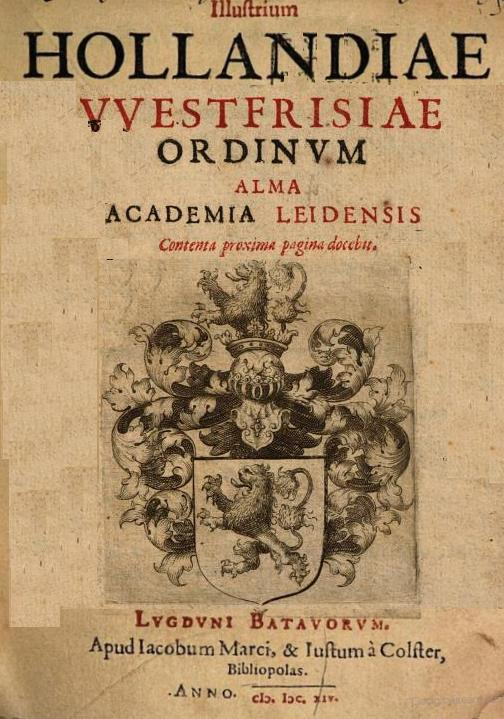
- Illustrator: various artists
- Language: Latin
- Publication place: Netherlands

Alma Academia Leidensis refers to an illustrated book about the professors of the University of Leiden, the Netherlands.

The most common version of the book Illustrium Hollandiae Westfrisiae ordinum alma academia Leidensis was published in 1614 and contained a series of engraved portraits of Leiden professors. Six versions were identified by the Amsterdam bibliographer Frederik Muller in 1888, that were published in 1609, 1613, 1614, 1617, 1715 and 1716. Muller made a list of the engravings and later J.F. van Someren made a concordance of the portraits from all the various editions, as some of the portraits were redone by later artists. Identifiable engravers were Crispijn van de Passe and Jan van de Velde.

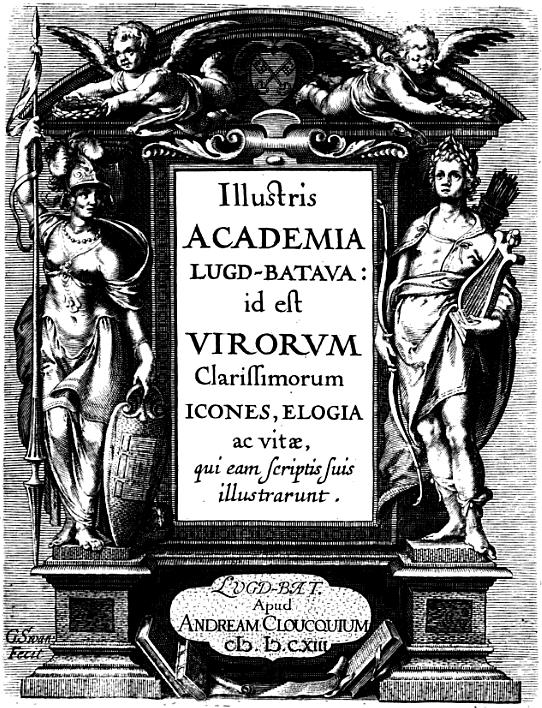
Illustris Academia Lugd-Batava id est Virorum Clarissimorum Icones, Elogia ac vitae, 1613

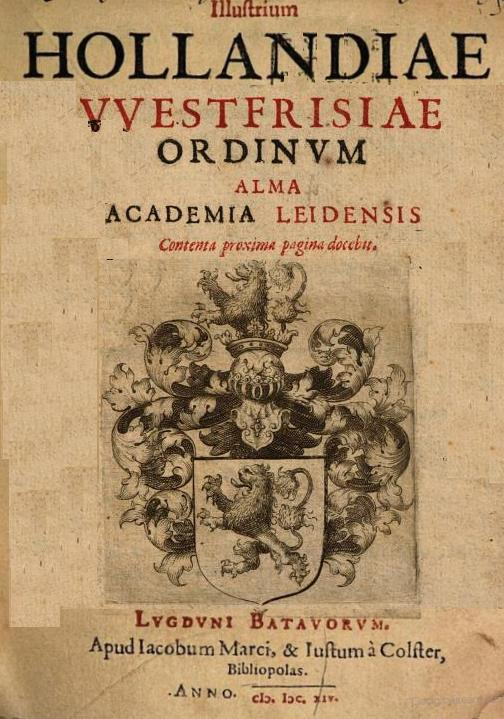
Illustrium Hollandiae Westfrisiae ordinum alma academia Leidensis, 1614

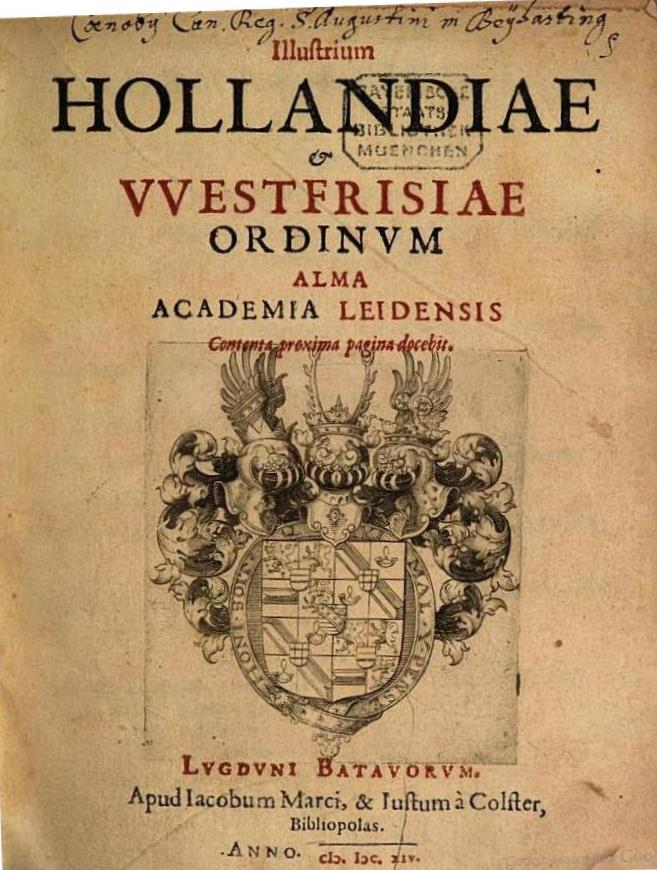
Other version from 1614

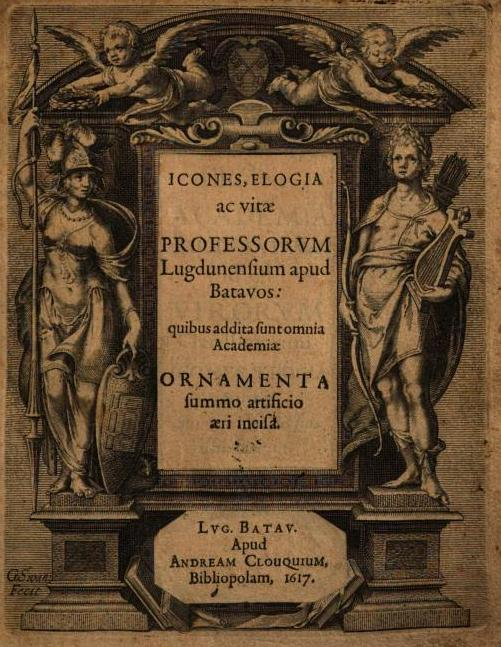
Icones, Elogia ac vitae Professorum Lugdunensium apud Batavos - Andream Clouquium, 1617

The 1614 version included 5 "blank" engravings, possibly because the subjects had died before anyone could make their likeness, or because their likenesses were not ready in time for publication and book-buyers would be able to paste these in at a later date:

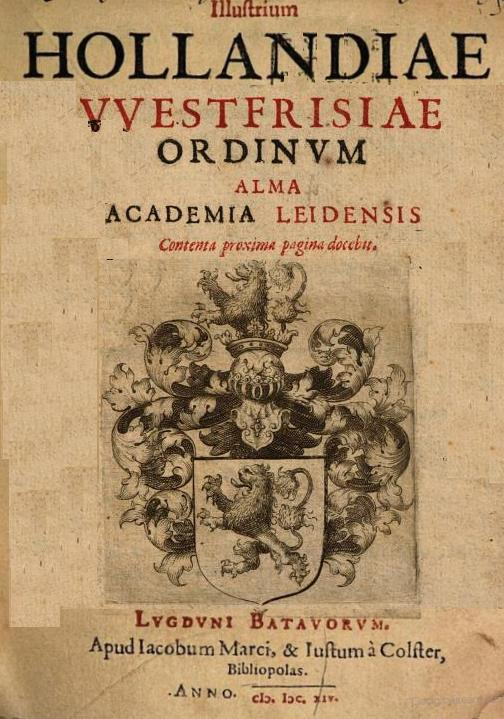
frontispiece

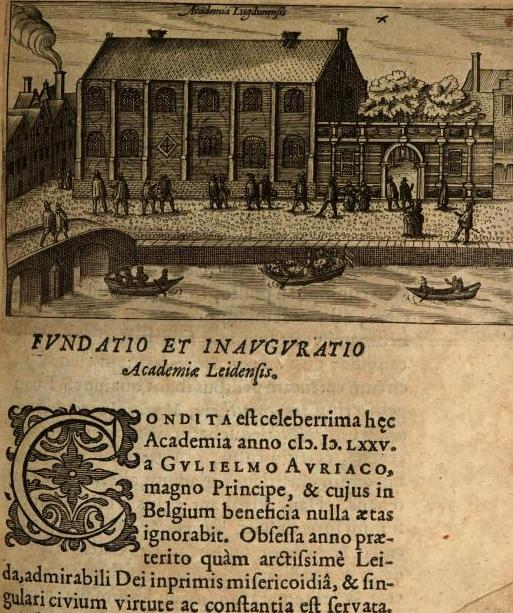
Leiden University

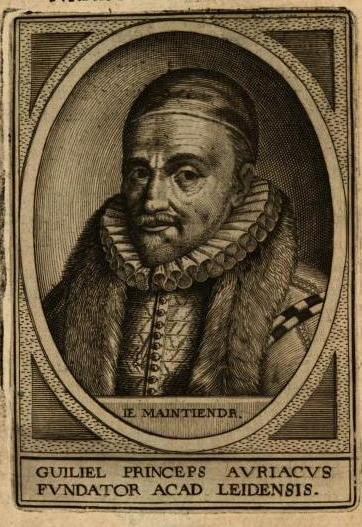
Giulielmus Princeps

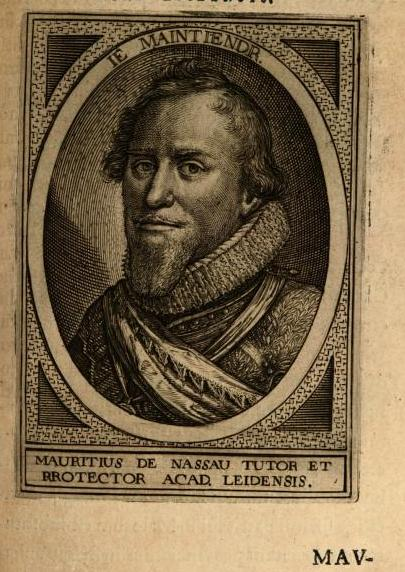
Mauritius de Nassau

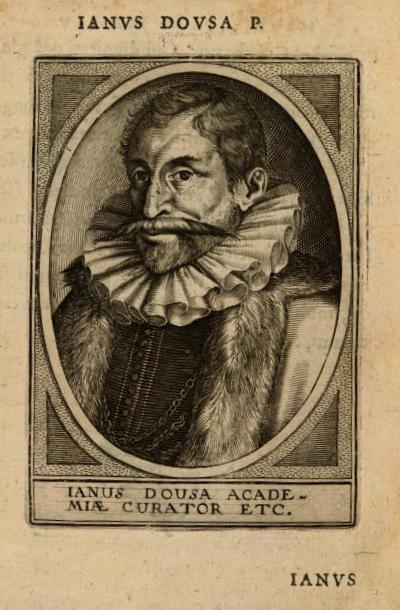
Janus Dousa

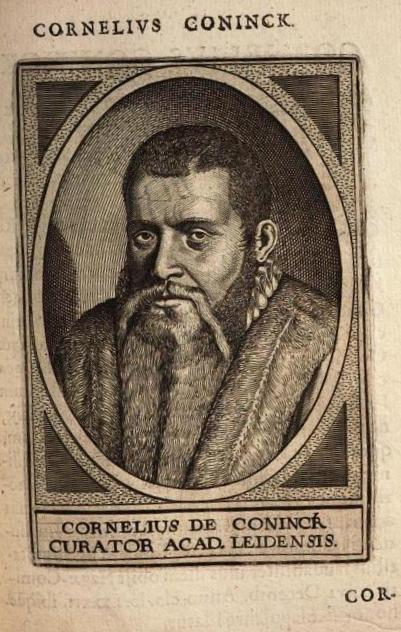
Cornelius Coninck

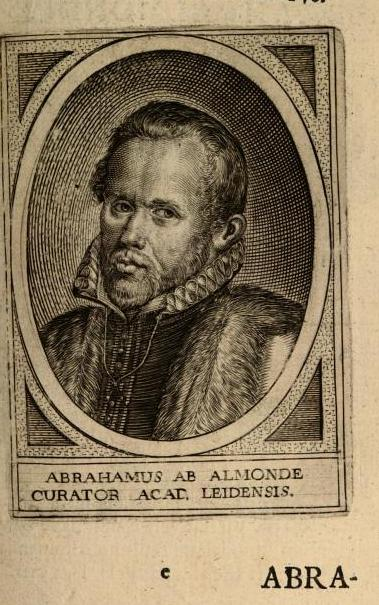
Abrahamus ab Almonde

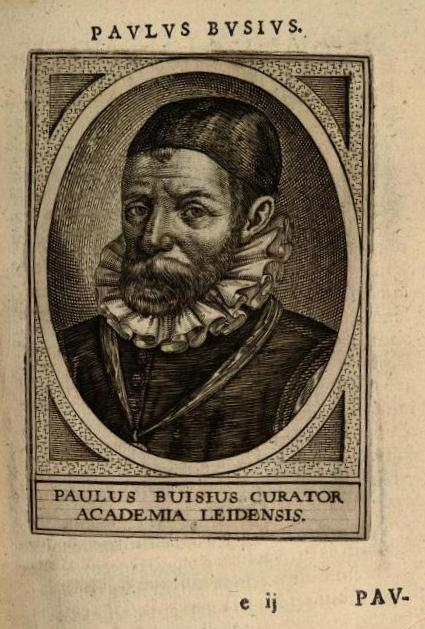
Paulus Buisius

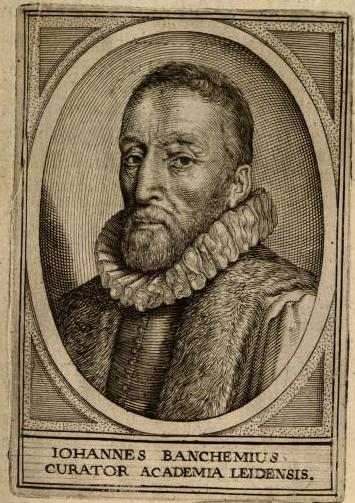
Johannes Banchemius

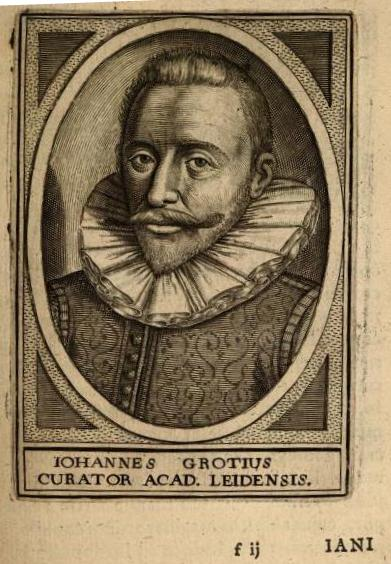
Johannes Grotius

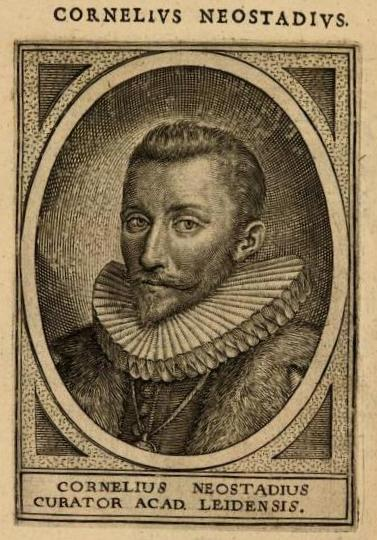
Cornelius Neostadius

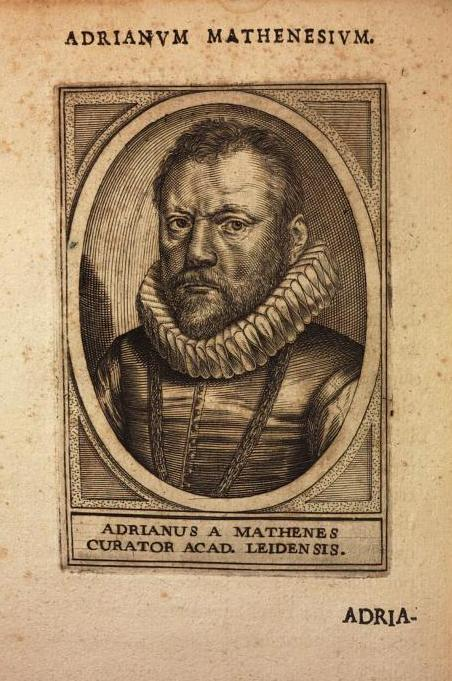
Adrianus a Mathenes

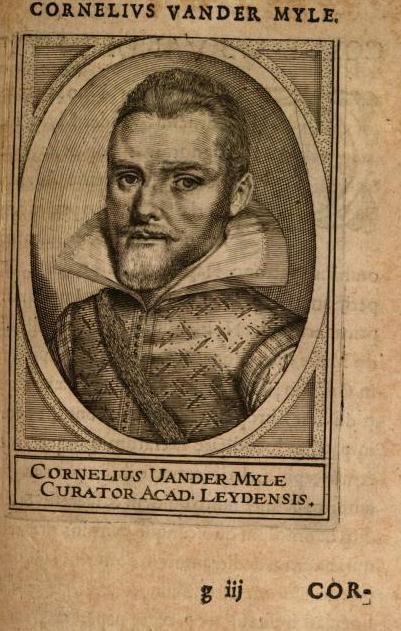
Cornelius vander Myle

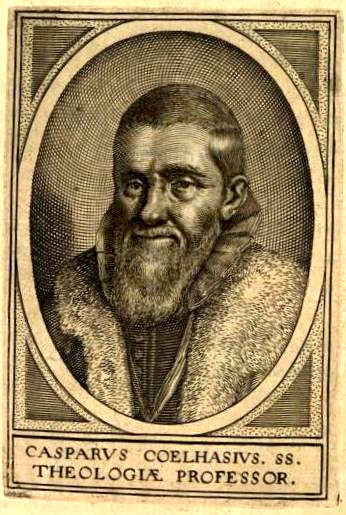
Casparus Coelhasius

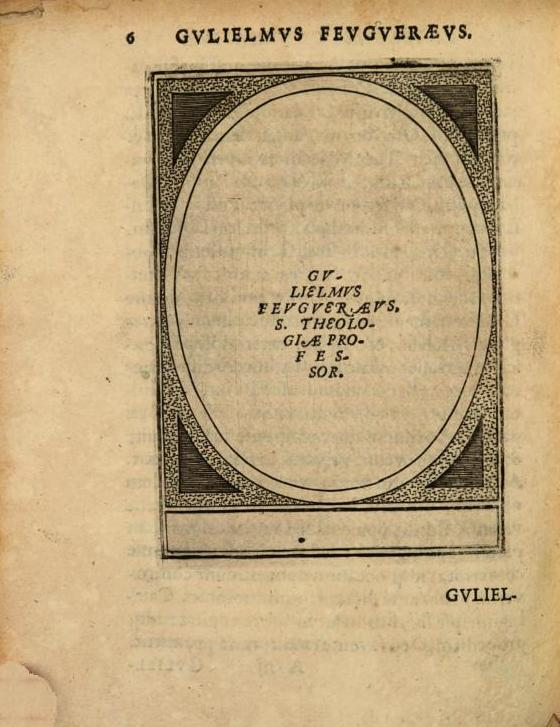
Guliel Fevgueraeus

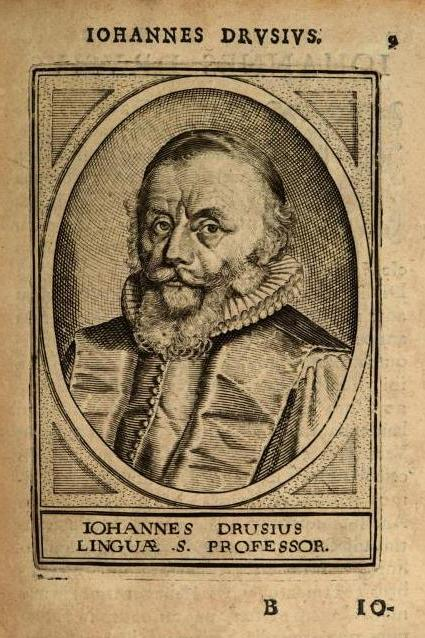
Johannes Drusius

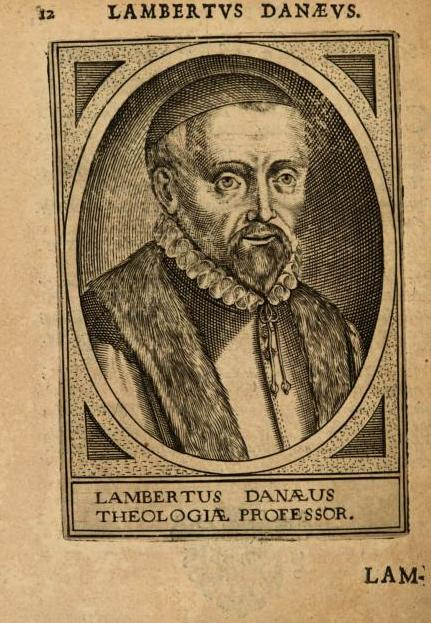
Lambertus Danaeus

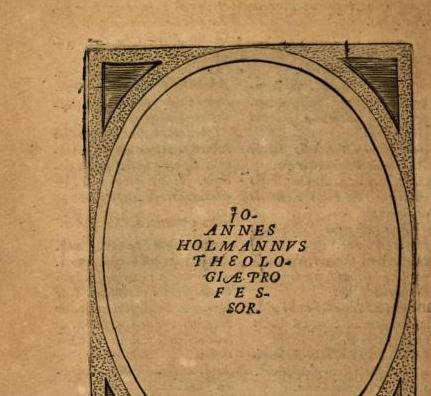
Johannes Holmannus

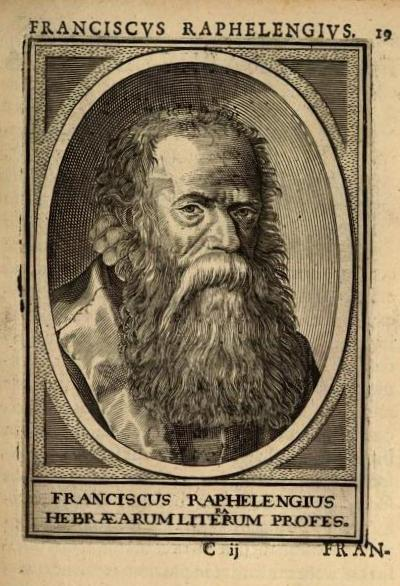
Franciscus Raphelengius

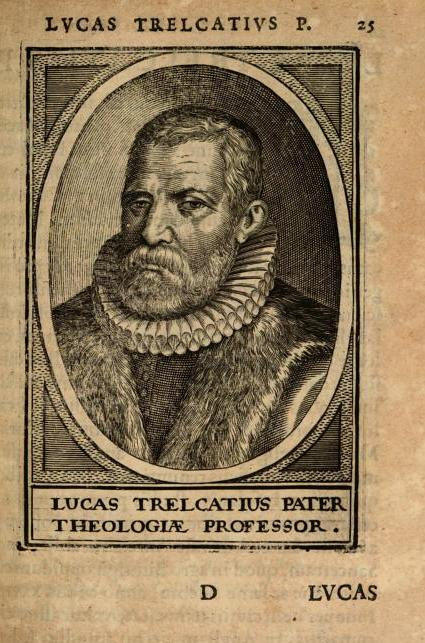
Lucas Trelcatius

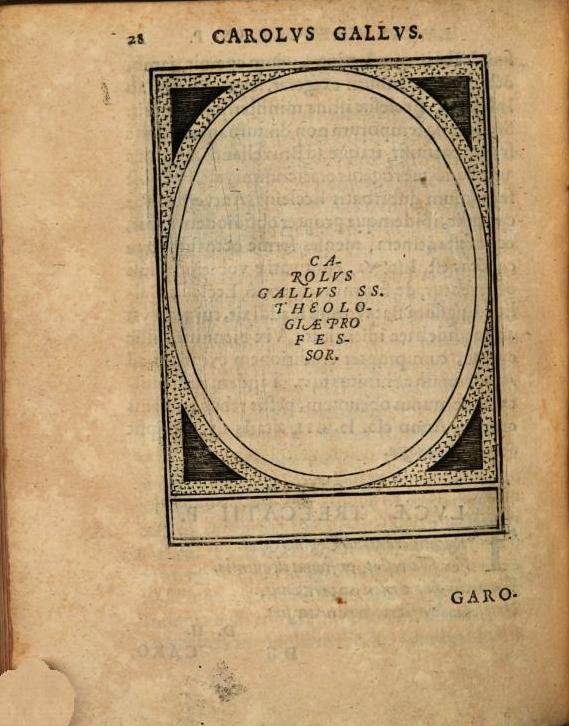
Carolus Gallus

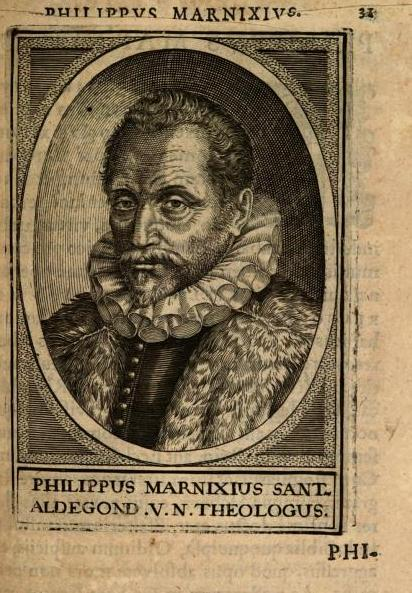
Philippus Marnixius Sant Aldegond

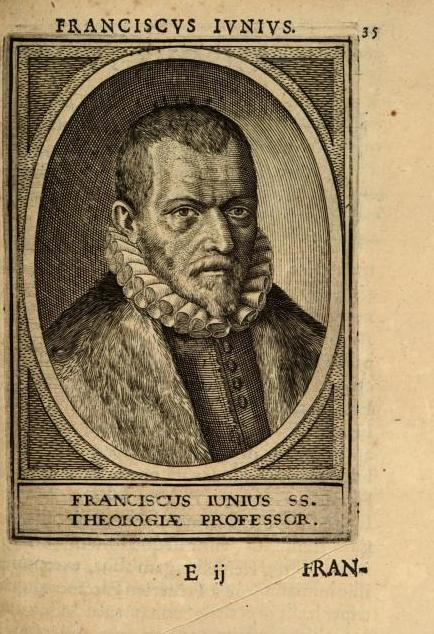
Franciscus Junius

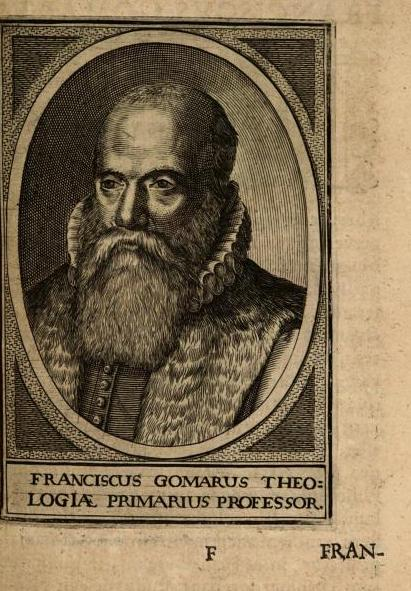
Franciscus Gomarus

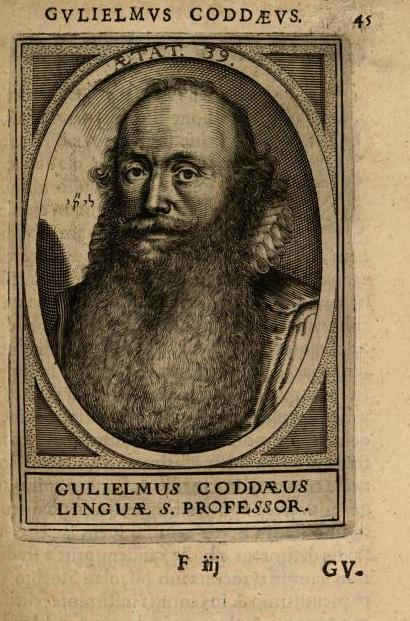
Gulielmus Coddaeus

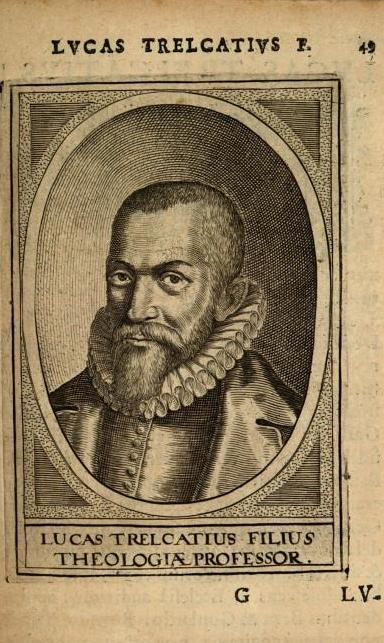
Lucas Trelcatius Filius

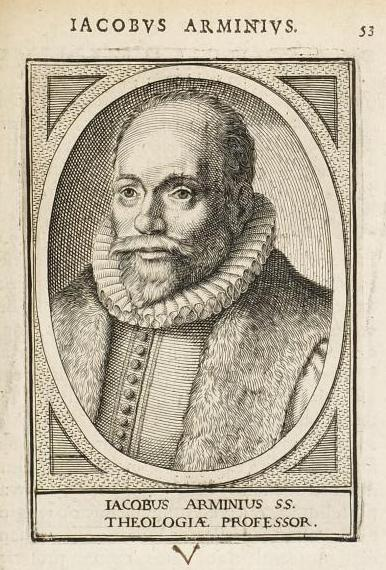
Jacobus Arminius

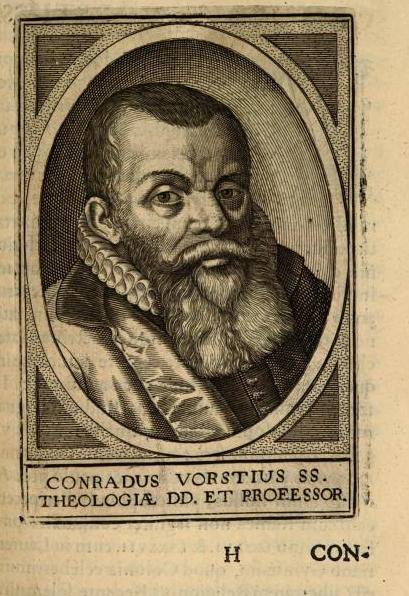
Conradus Vorstius

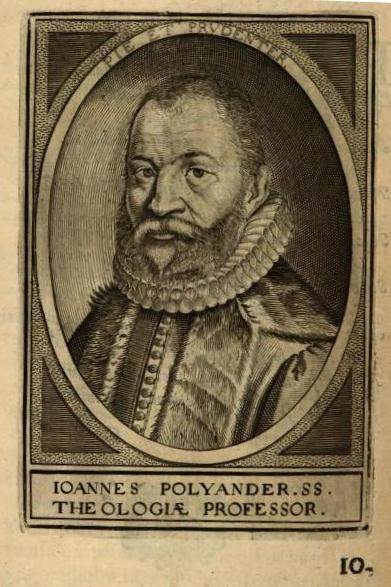
Johannes Polyander

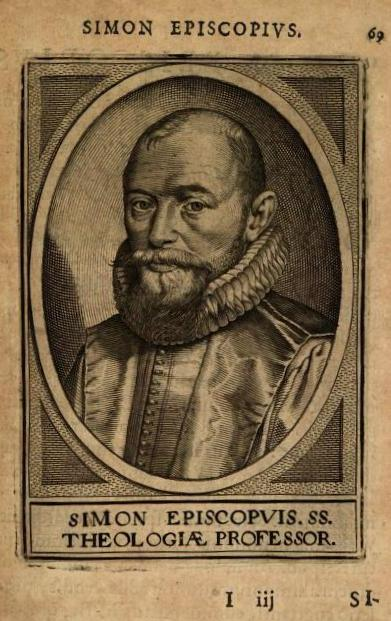
Simon Episcopius

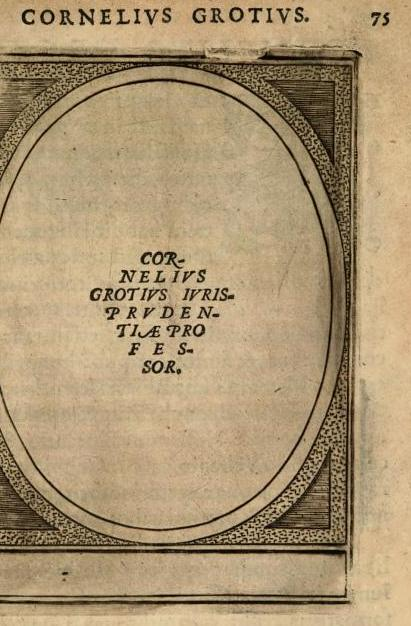
Cornelius Grotius

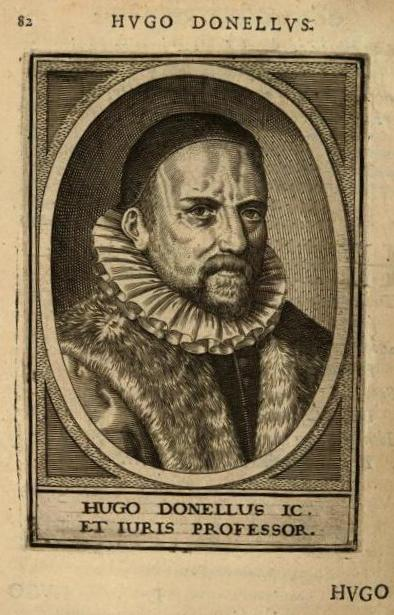
Hugo Donellus

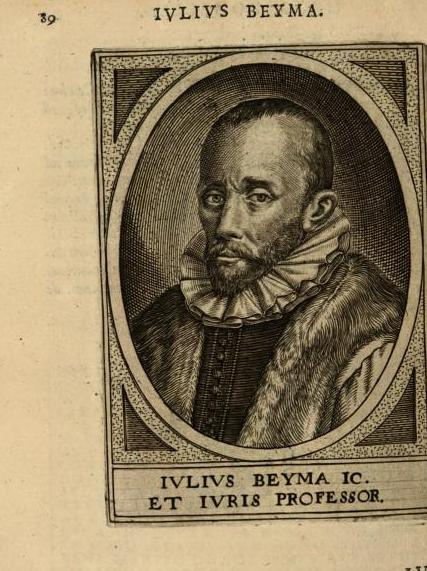
Julius Beyma

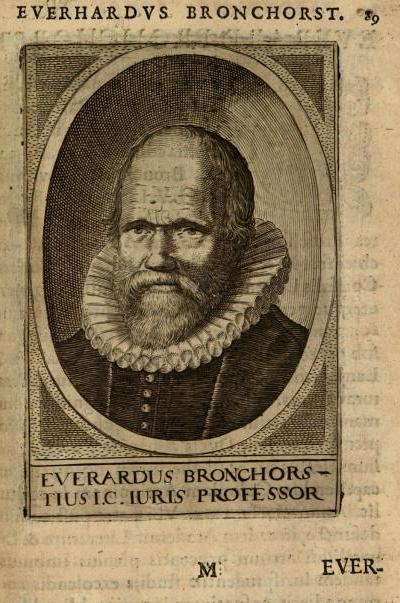
Everardus Bronchorstius

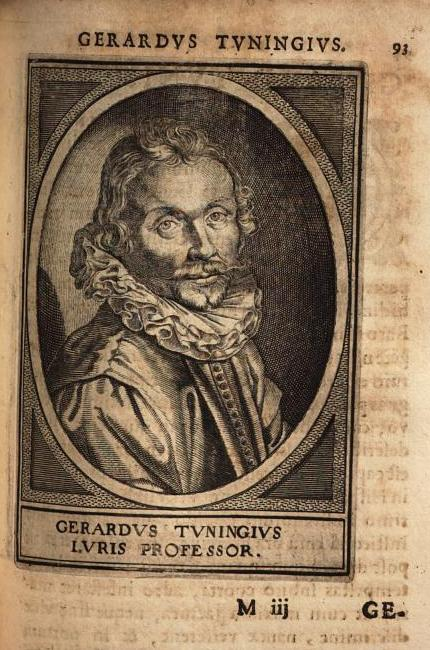
Gerardus Tuningius

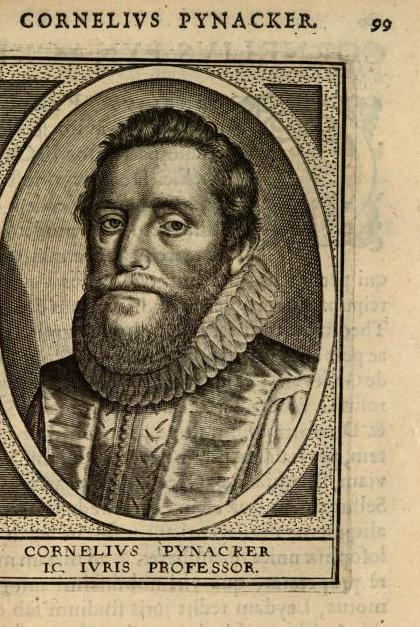
Cornelius Pynacker

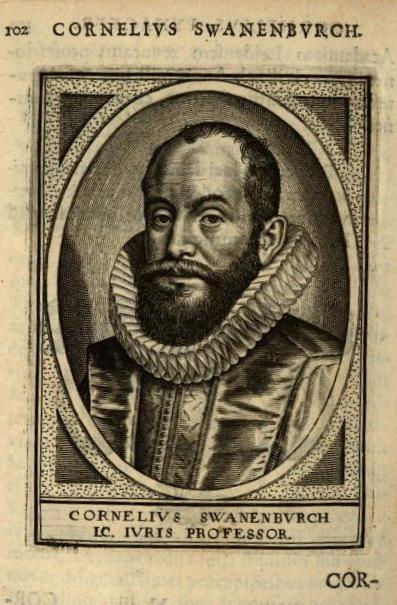
Cornelius Swanenburch

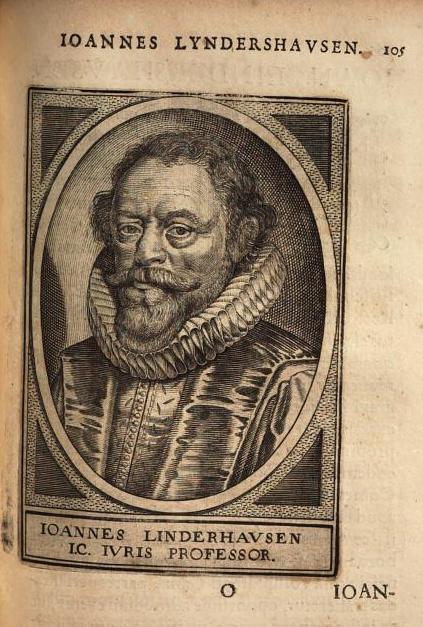
Johannes Linderhausen

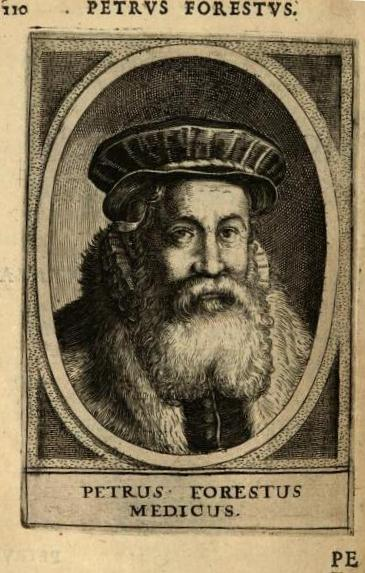
Petrus Forestus

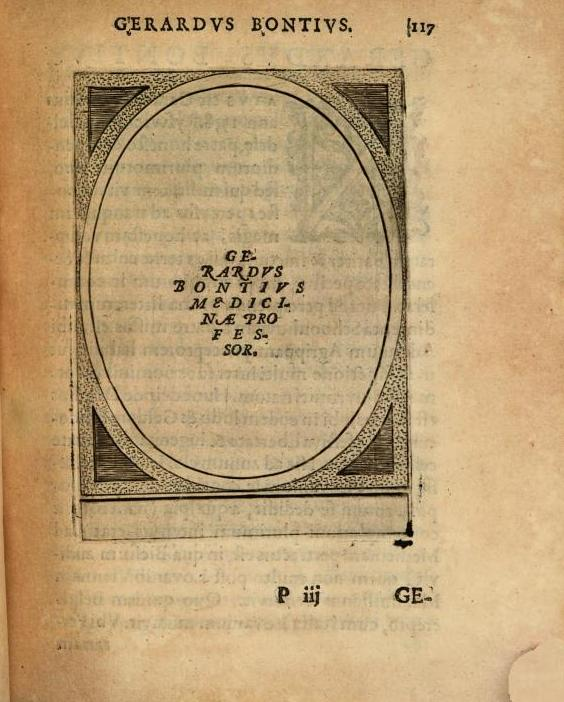
Gerardus Bontius

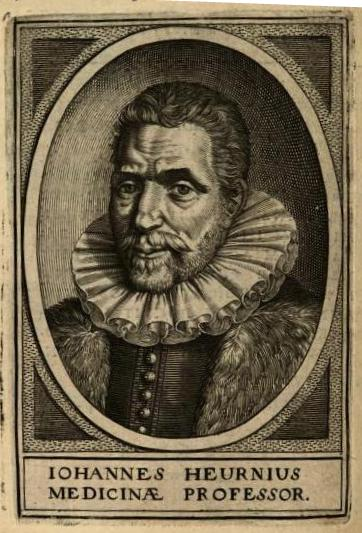
Johannes Heurnius

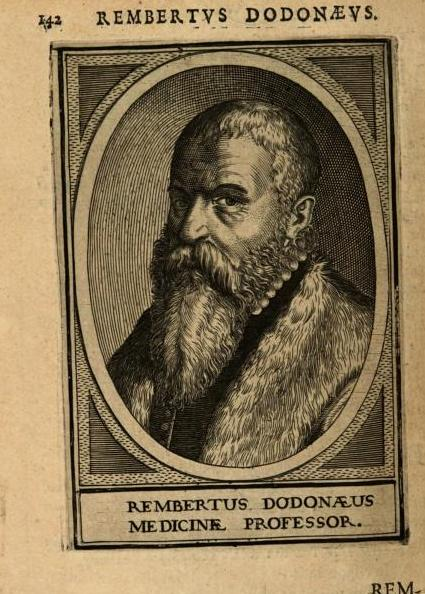
Rembertus Dodonaeus

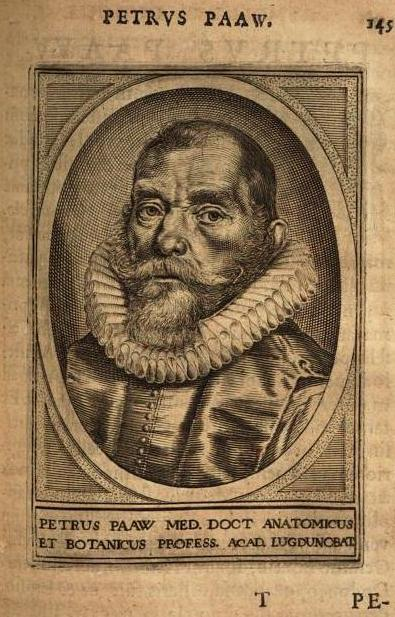
Petrus Pauw

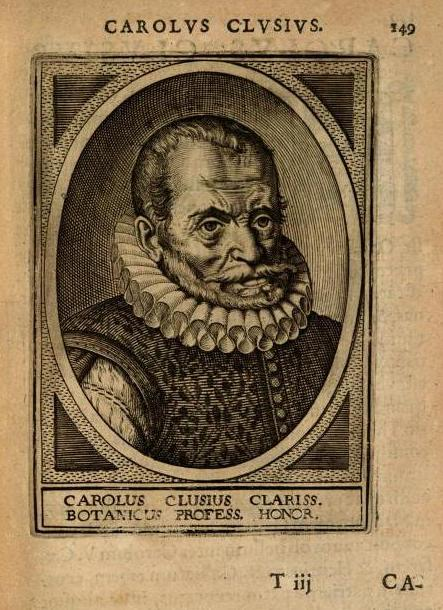
Carolus Clusius

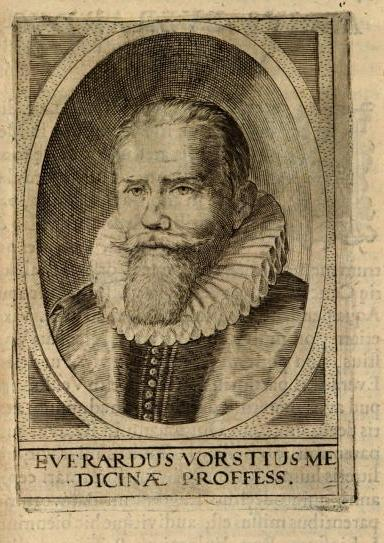
Everardus Vorstius

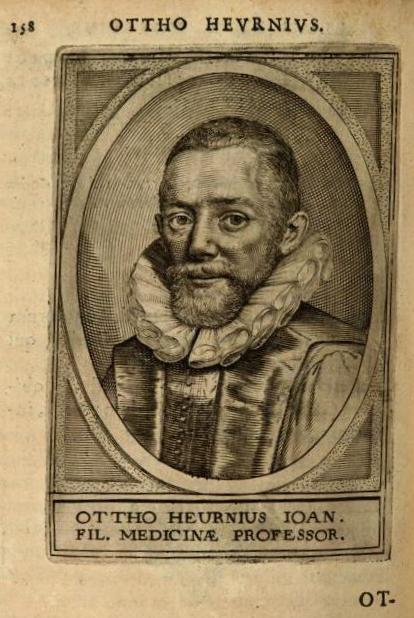
Ottho Heurnius

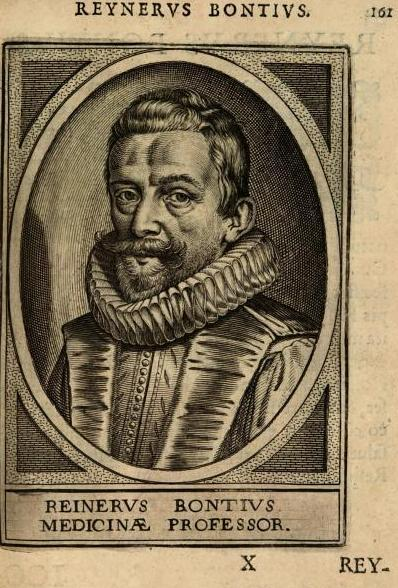
Reynerus Bontius

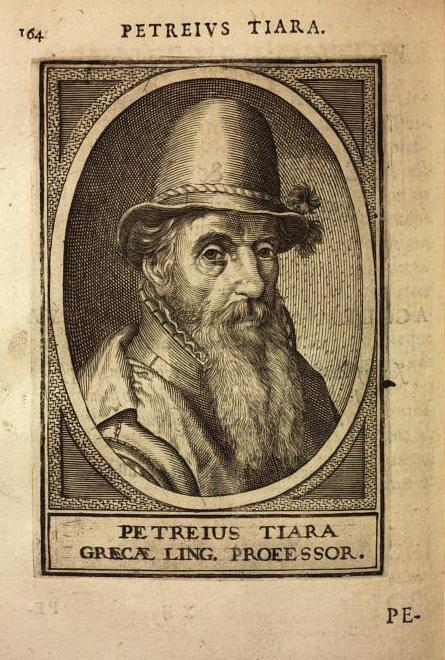
Petreius Tiara

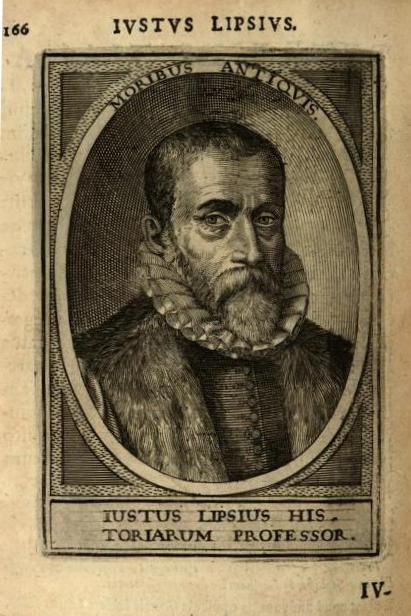
Justus Lipsius

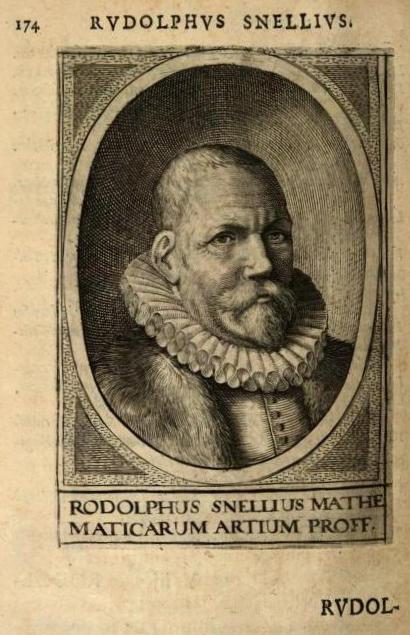
Rodolphius Snellius

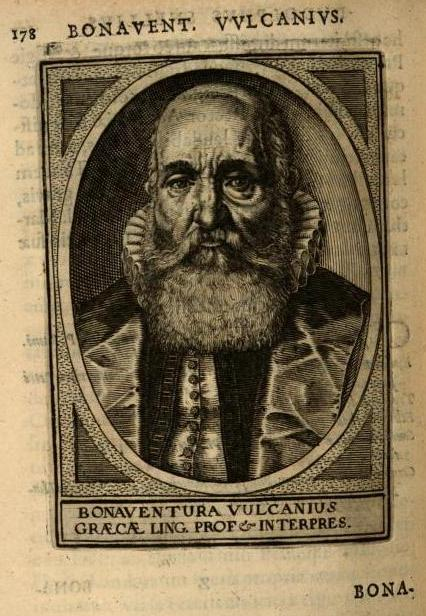
Bonaventura Vulcanius

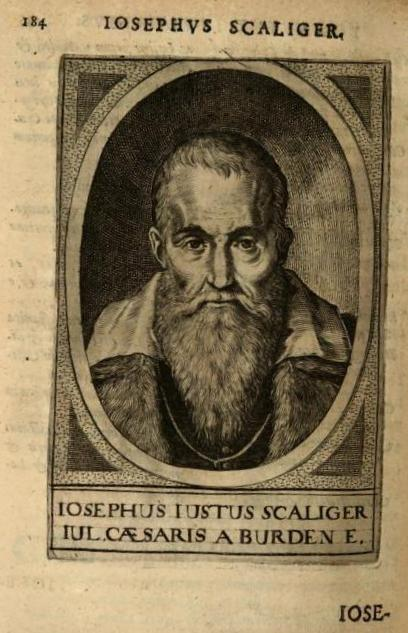
Josephus Justus Scaliger

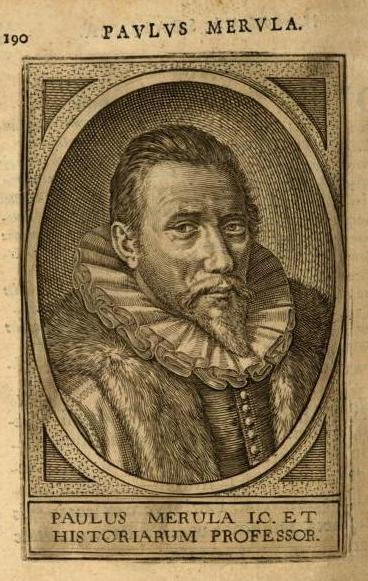
Paulus Merula

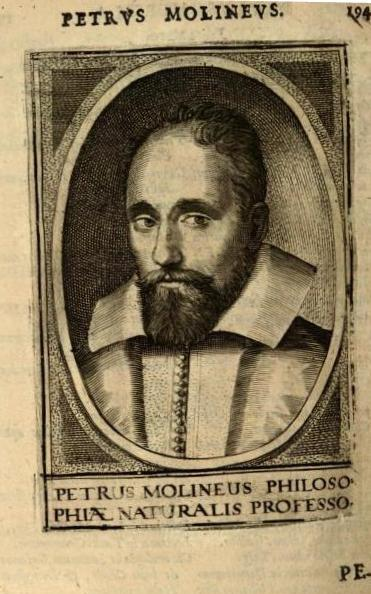
Petrus Molineus

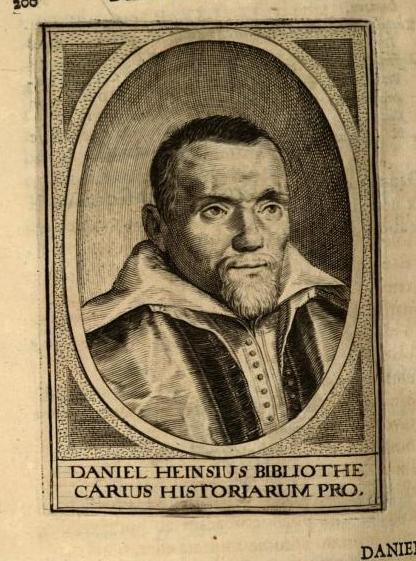
Daniel Heinsius

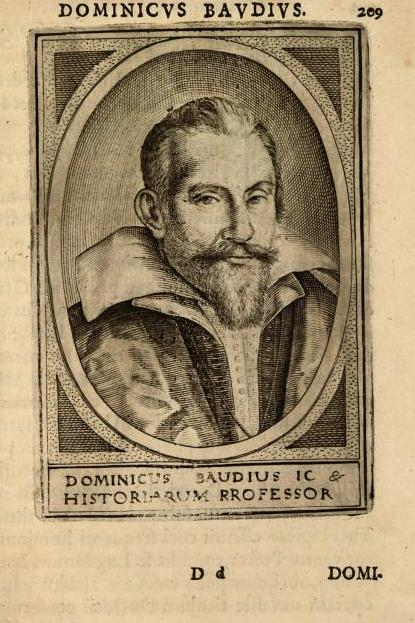
Dominicus Baudius

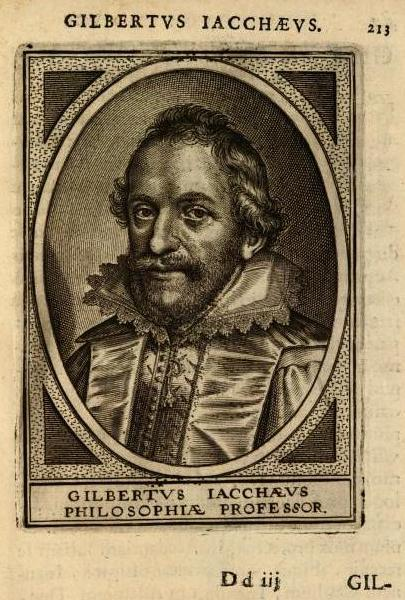
Gilbertus Jacchaeus

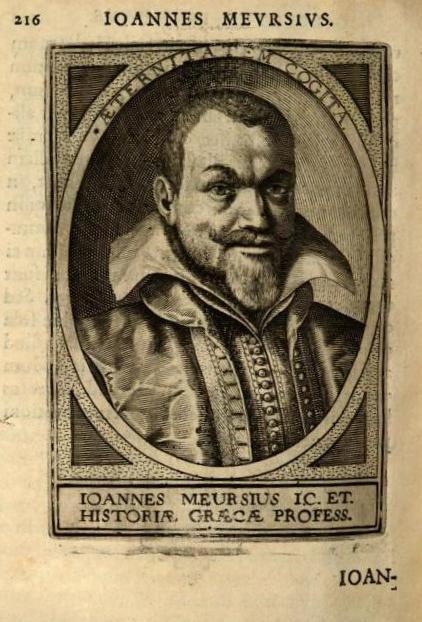
Johannes Meursius

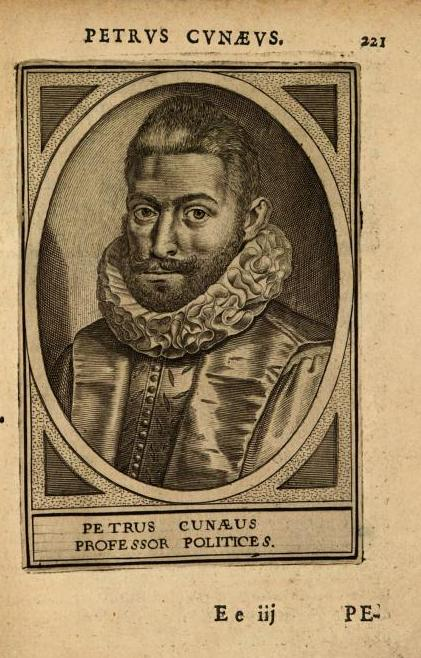
Petrus Cunaeus

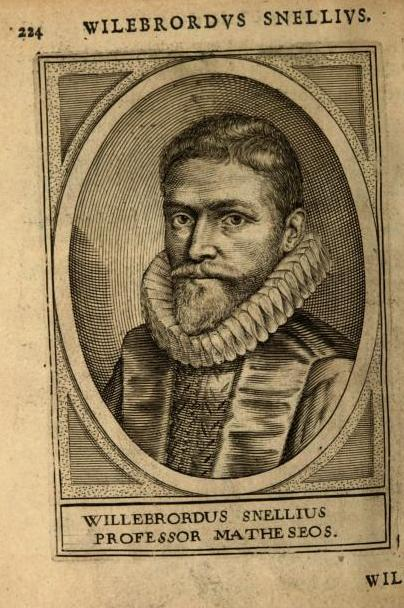
Willibrordus Snellius

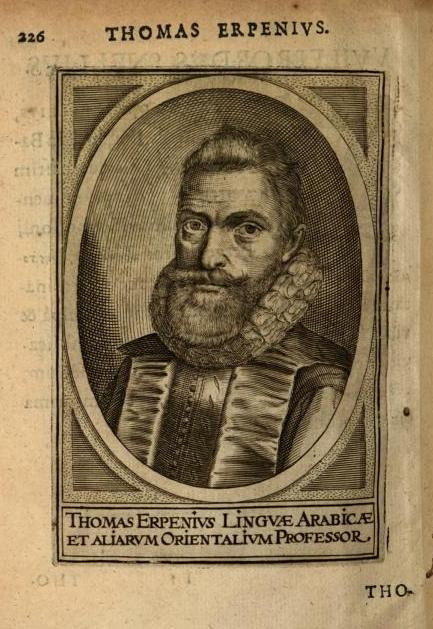
Thomas Erpenius

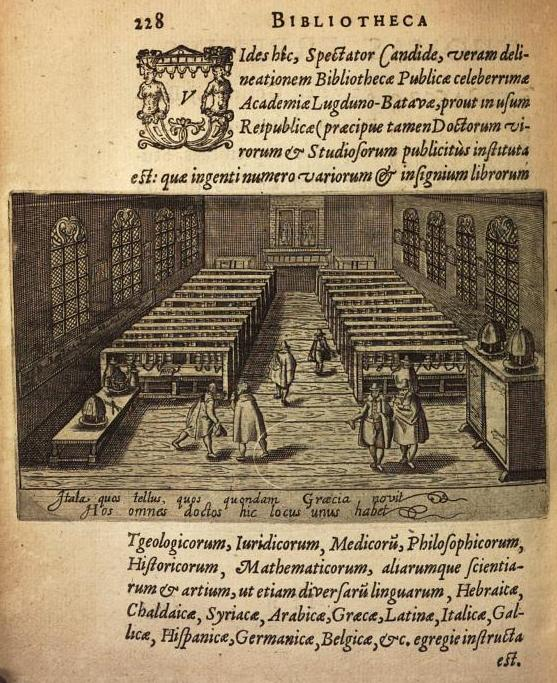
Bibliotheca

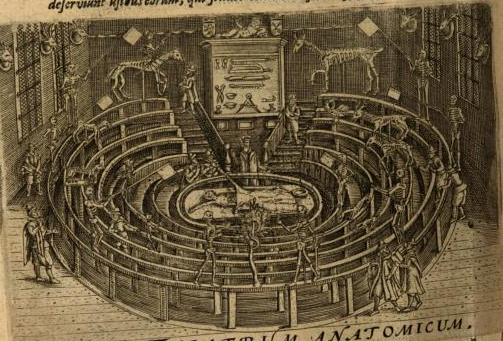
Theatrum Anatomicum

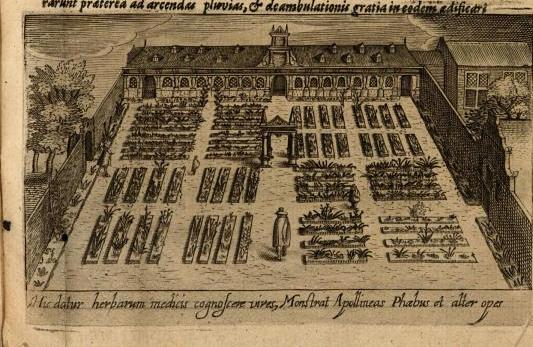
Hortus Botanicus Leiden
