= Carolus (name) =

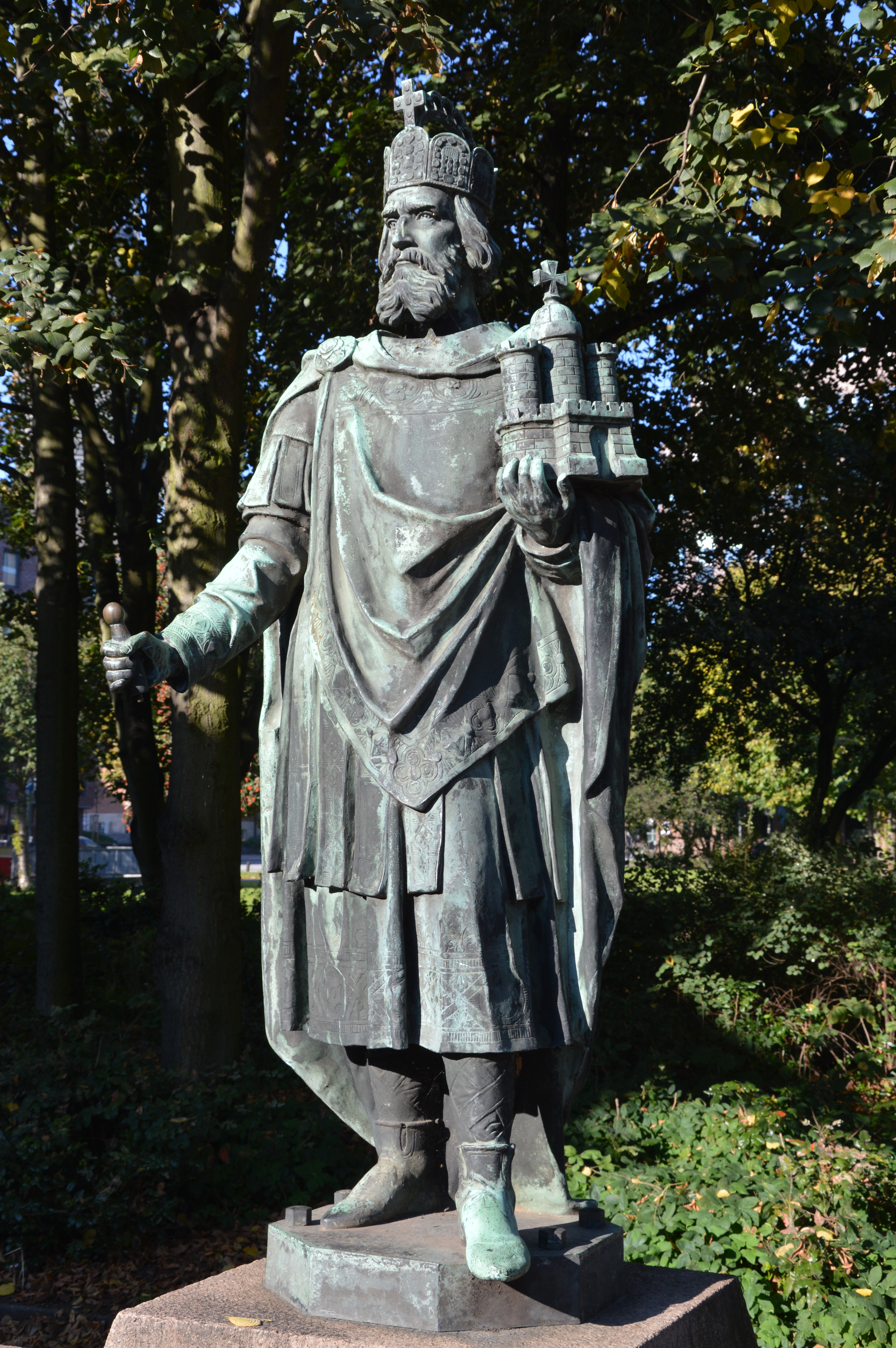
Bronze statue of Charlemagne by Engelbert Peiffer, 1889

Carolus is the medieval Latin form of the name Charles. It was the name of various Frankish rulers, most notably of Charlemagne (742–814).

The given name also gave rise to a surname in the 17th century.

== People ==
=== First name or title ===
- Carolus Andriamatsinoro (born 1989), Malagasy footballer
- Carolus Arretinus or Carlo Marsuppini (1399–1453), Italian humanist and chancellor
- Carolus Clusius (Charles de l'Écluse), Flemish doctor and botanist
- Carolus de Tilly (1642–1698), French Roman Catholic prelate
- Carolus-Duran (Charles Auguste Émile Durand), French painter
- Carolus Fernández de Velasco (1596–1665) Belgian Roman Catholic clergy
- Carolus Antonius Fodor or Carel Anton Fodor (1768–1846), Dutch composer
- Carolus Gallus (1530–1616), Dutch minister and polemicist
- Carolus Hacquart (c. 1640 – after 1686), Flemish composer
- Carolus Magnus Hutschenreuther (1794–1845), German industrialist
- Carolus Adrianus Johannes Kreutz (born 1954), Dutch orchidologist, botanical writer and taxonomist
- Carolus Lassila (1922–1987), Finnish diplomat
- Carolus Luython (1557–1620), Belgian composer
- Carolus Linnaeus (Carl Linnaeus or Carl von Linné), Swedish botanist and physician
- Carolus Linnaeus the Younger (Carl Linnaeus the Younger), Swedish naturalist
- Carolus Luython, 17th-century composer
- Carolus Magnus (Charlemagne), Holy Roman Emperor
- Carolus Maneken (1419–1493), professor
- Carolus Mulerius (1601–1638), Dutch Hispanist and grammarian
- Carolus Niellius (1576–1652), Dutch Remonstrant minister
- Carolus Nolet (born 1940/41), Dutch businessman
- Carolus Polodig (1671–1714), Czech Roman Catholic prelate
- Carolus Johannes Reinecke (born 1941), South African rector
- Carolus Rex (Charles XII of Sweden), King of Sweden
- Carolus Sigonius (c. 1524 – 1584), Italian humanist
- Carolus Souliaert (died 1540), 16th-century composer
- Carolus Stoffels (1893–1957), Dutch modern pentathlete
- Carolus Wimmer (born 1948), German politician
- Carolus Wrede (1860–1927), Finnish industrialist

=== Middle name ===
- Christianus Carolus Henricus van der Aa (1718–1793), Dutch Lutheran pastor
- Francis Carolus Eeles (1876–1954), English liturgical scholar and ecclesiastical historian

=== Surname ===
- Cheryl Carolus, South African politician
- Jean Carolus, 19th-century Belgian artist
- Johann Carolus, 17th-century newspaper publisher
- Joris Carolus, 17th-century Dutch cartographer
- Louis Carolus-Barré (1910–1993), French librarian and medievalist
- Charles C. Carolus, United States Navy Hospital Corpsman
