= Willem van der Codde =

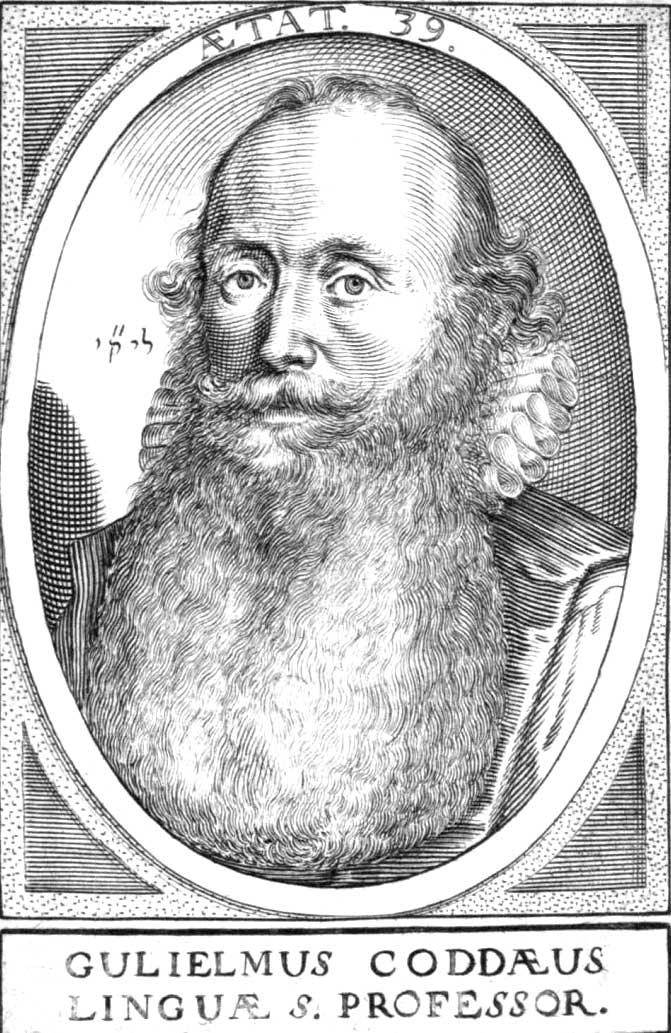
Willem van der Codde

Willem van der Codde or Coddaeus (1574 – after 1625), was a theologian and writer from the Northern Netherlands.

== Biography ==
He was born in Leiden as the son of Jacob van der Codde during the siege of Leiden, when his father was away in Delft. He was taught in Leiden by the professors Franciscus Raphelengius, Franciscus Junius, Lucas Trelcatius, and Franciscus Gomarus. He became a professor there himself and taught Hebrew in Leiden to Gisbertus Voetius and Caspar Sibelius, among others. He was dismissed in 1619 for siding with Remonstrants, and imprisoned briefly in 1623 for the same reason. He was still alive in 1625 and probably died in Leiden.

== Works ==
- Declaratio D. Jacobi Arminii, quâ coram potentissimis Hollandiae et Westfrisiae Ordinibus sententiam suam explicuil de Praedestinatione, Providentia Dei, et id genus spectantibus aliis doctrinae capitibus, in linguam Latinam conversa, Lugd. Batavorum [Leiden], 1608
- Notae ad Grammaticam Hebraeam Martini Navarri Morentini, Lugd. Bat., 1612
- Oratio funebris in laudem celeberrimi Mathematici D. Rudolphi Snellii, Lugd. Bat., 1613
- Hoseas Propheta Ebraicè et Chaldaicè cum duplici versione Latina et Commentariis Ebraicis trium doctissimorum Judaeorum, Salomonis Jarchi, Aben Ezrae et Davidis Kimchi, Masora item parva, ejusque et Commentariorum Latina quoque interpretatione; accedunt in fine succinctae annotariones Guil. Coddaei, Lugd. Bat., 1621
- Sylloge vocum versuumque proverbialium, Lugd. Bat., 1623
- Fragmenta Comoediarum Aristophanis, Lugd. Bat., 1623
