= Grimbergen Abbey =

Premonstratensian monastery in Flemish Brabant, Belgium

Coordinates: 50°56′02″N 4°22′15″E

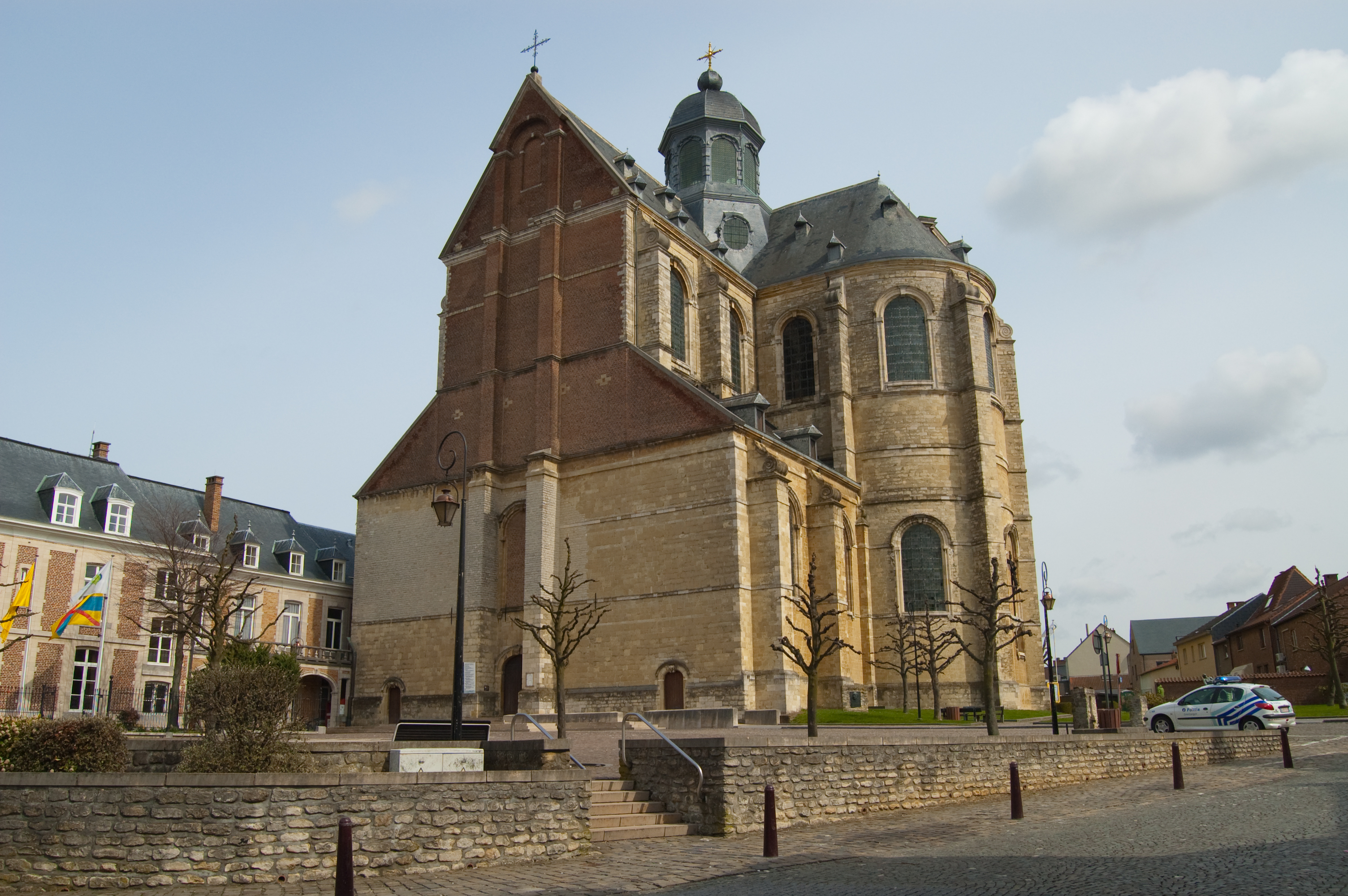
Grimbergen Abbey church.

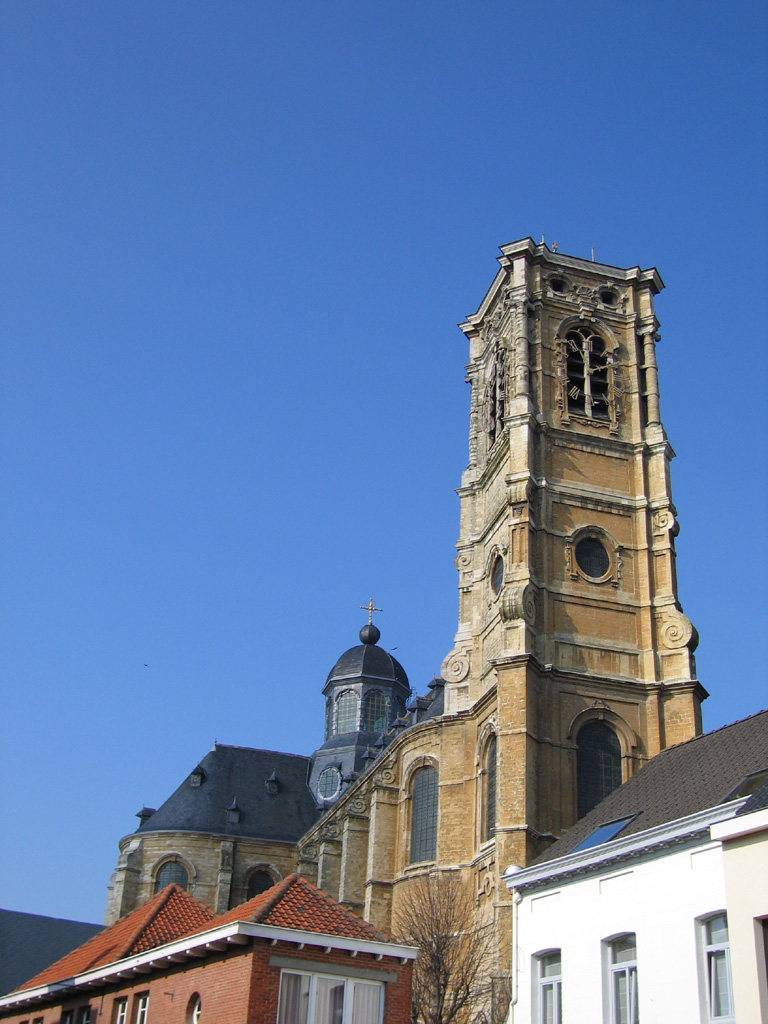
Grimbergen Abbey belltower.

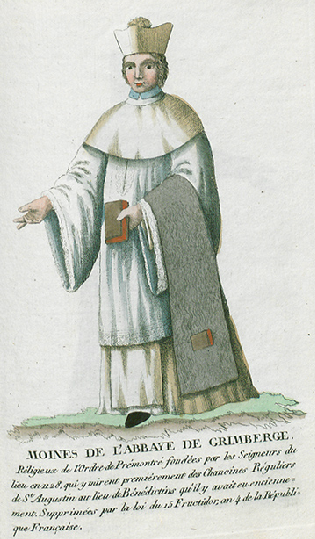
Monk of Grimberghen Abbey

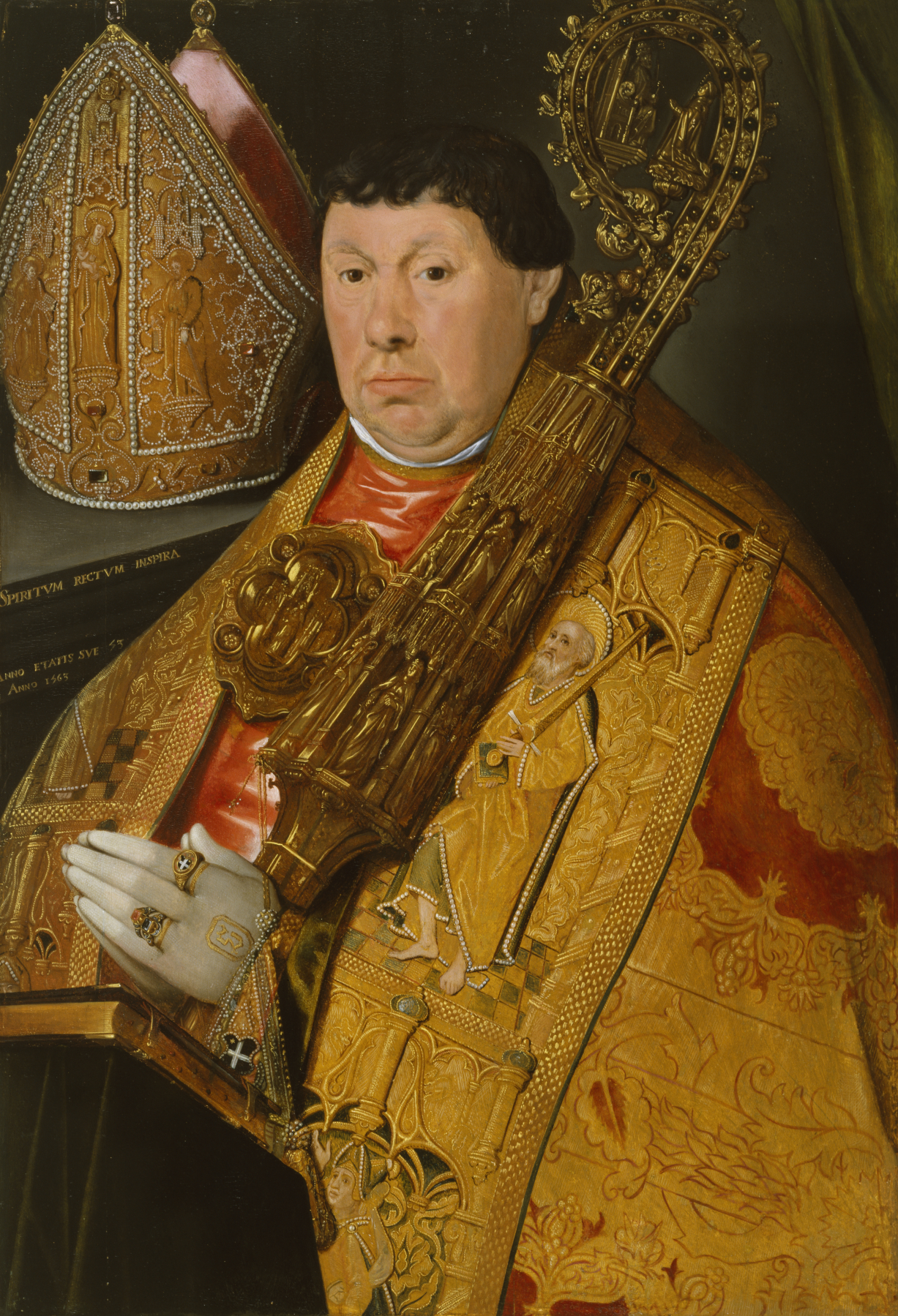
Nicolaus a Spira, abbot between 1543 and 1568

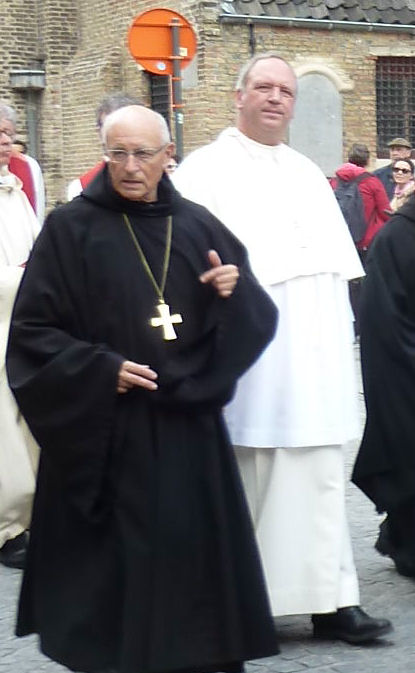
Erik de Sutter, right, current Abbot

Grimbergen Abbey is a Premonstratensian monastery in Grimbergen, Flemish Brabant, Belgium, established in 1128 in the place of an earlier foundation of Augustinian Canons.

The abbey itself was dissolved in 1796 in the aftermath of the French Revolution, but the abbey church of Saint Servatius survived as the parish church of Grimbergen. After the French Revolution the abbey was reinstated. The building in its present form dates from 1660. It was elevated to the status of basilica minor in 1999.

== Abbots ==
- 1. Humbertus (–1148 of 1149) († 1148)
- 2. Diederik of Theodoricus (–1170) (†1178)
- 3. Egbertus († 1179 of 1182)
- 4. Simon († 1196)
- 5. Ioannes († 1208)
- 6. Jan van Merchtem (–1214) (†1214)
- 7. Hescelo (1200–1223) (†1223)
- 8. Willem (1223–1228) (†1229)
- 10. Franco (1228-1244) (†1244)
- 11. Daniël (1247)
- 12. Walterus de Roesbeke († 1249)
- 13. Gosuinus († 1270)
- 14. Walterus († 1303)
- 15. Anselmus († 1314)
- 16. Jan van Poddegem (†1325)
- 17. Geeraard van Overijse († 1330)
- 18. Wouter van Marck († 1354)
- 19. Godefridus de Vos († 1371)
- 20. Jan van den Hove († 1392)
- 21. Aegidius de Paepe († 1396)
- 22. Radulphus de Busingem (1367-1387) († 1397)
- 23. Boudewijn de Prickere (1396-1400) († 1403)
- 24. Aegidius de Boeckhout (1400-1416) († 1416)
- 25. Cornelius de Kempenaer (1416-1446) († 1446)
- 26. Ioannes (Jan) Vranckx (1446–1465) († 1465)
- 27. Jan van Mechelen (1465–1474) († 1474)
- 28. Jan van der Molen (1468/69–1477) († 1477)
- 29. Mark van der Straeten (1477–1489) († 1489)
- 30. Arnoldus Persoens (1489- 1505) († 1509) Disce pati
- 31. Petrus van Wayenberghe (1505–1540)(† 1540)
- 32. Franciscus du Blioul (1540–1542) († 1542)
- 33. Nicolaus a Spira (1543–1568) († 1568) Spiritum rectum inspira
- 34. Geraard van Campenhout (1569–1577) († 1577)
- 35. Antoon van Oyenbrugge (1577–1594) († 1594)
- 36. Filip van Raubergen (1594–1613) († 1613)
- 37. Christophorus Outers (1613–1647) (+ 1647)
- 38. Carolus Fernández de Velasco (1647–1665) († 1665) Illumina
- 39. Iudocus (Joost) vander Elst (1665–1670)(† 1670)
- 40. Laurentius Bogaerts (1670–1692) († 1692)
- 41. Judocus Bassery (1692–1698) (- † 1698)
- 42. Herman de Munck (1698–1712) († 1712)
- 43. Augustinus van Eeckhout (1716–1747) (+1747)
- 44. Franciscus Casens (1747–1755): Fortitudo mea Deus
- 45. Jan-Baptist Sophie (1755–1775): Super astra sophia
- 46. Ignatius Josephus du Rondeau (1775–1778): Praesis et prosis
- 47. Nicolas Joseph Maras (1778–1794): Nemo sibi

=== After the French Revolution ===
- 48. Jan-Baptist Van Den Bergen (1834–1851)
- 49. Godfried Van Overstraeten (1851–1870)
- 50. Ludolphus Van Beveren (1870–1876): Cor unum in Deo
- 51. Alexander Van Put (1876–1897) :In dilectione et patientia
- 52. Evermodus Lahaise of Lahaize (1897–1915): In te Domine speravi
- 53. Hiëronymus Hoppenbrouwers (1916–1941): Ora et labora
- 54. Augustinus Cantinjaeu (1942–1946) : In de vreugde der liefde
- 55. Hroznata Van Heesch (1946–1957)
- 56. Emiel Louis De Winde (1957–1982)
- 57. Werenfried Petrus Wagenaar (1982–2004): In vinculo pacis .
- 58. Erik De Sutter (2004–current): Illum oportet crescere.

== Other ==
Grimbergen is also known for its cheese, bread and beer, although at present its beer is being produced by the Carlsberg Group.. In May 2021 they announced they are now producing their own beer.
