= Caspar Sibelius =

Dutch Protestant minister

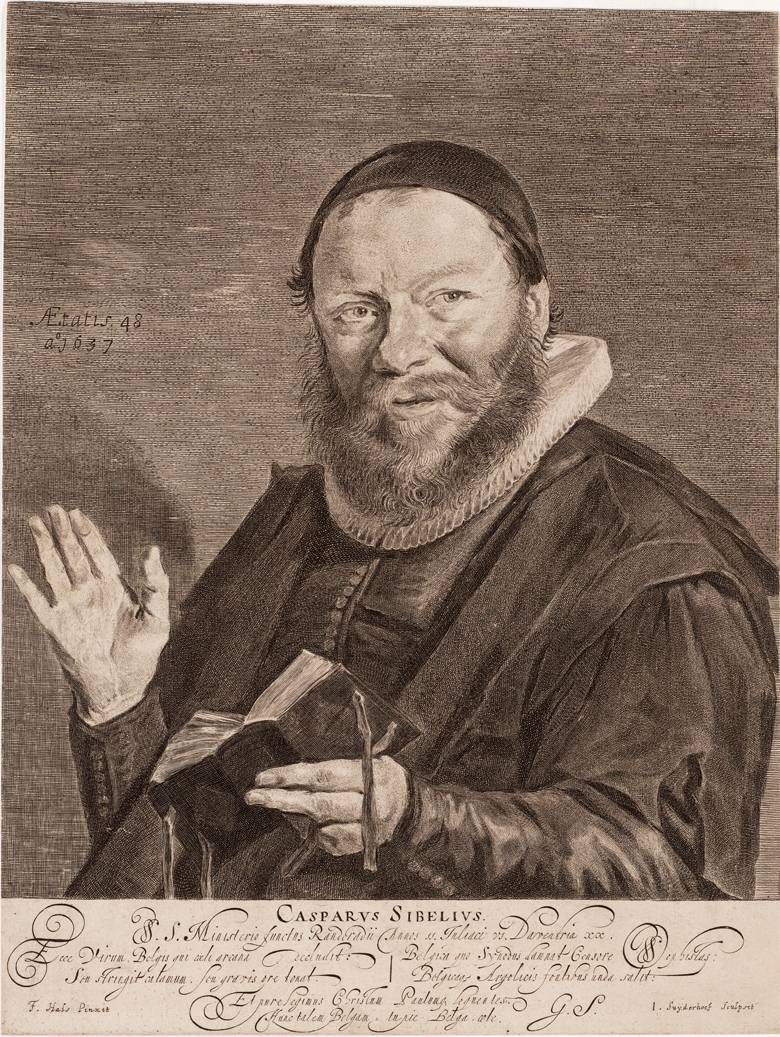
Portrait of Caspar Sibelius by Jonas Suyderhoef after a painting by Frans Hals

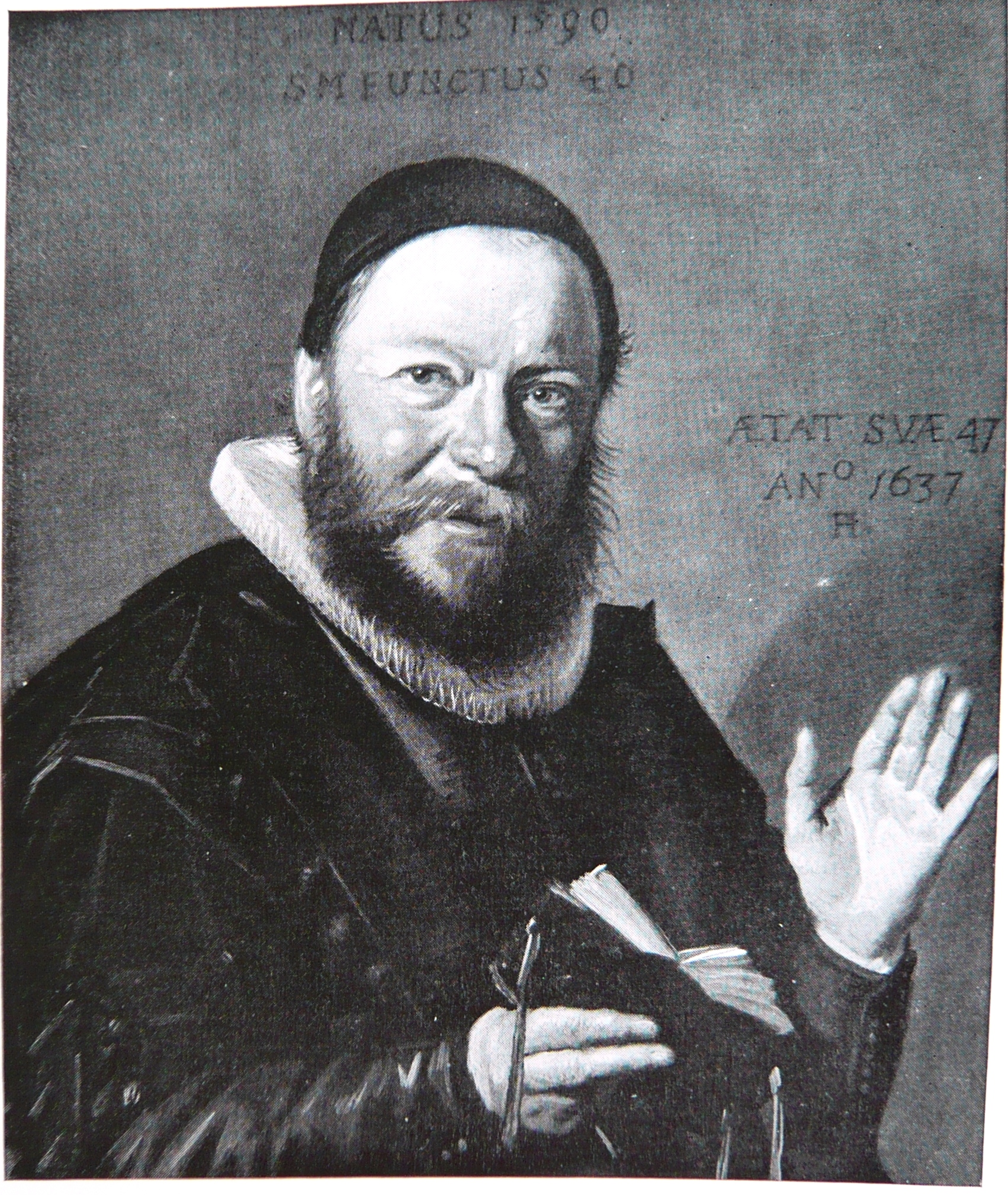
Photo of original painting by Frans Hals. This painting was lost in a fire in Mount Kisco, New York in 1956

Caspar Sibelius (9 June 1590 – 1 January 1658), was a Dutch Protestant minister.

== Biography ==
Sibelius was born in Elberfeld (now part of Wuppertal) and was trained in Herborn and Siegen before attending Leiden University to study theology under Gomarus and Arminius, and Hebrew under Coddaeus. On his return he became minister in Randerode (where he married the mayor's daughter Maria Klock, in 1610), Geilenkirchen and Gulik. In 1617 he was sent to the Hague, where he received a stipend for preaching in Nijmegen. He was called the same year to Deventer, where he stayed for 30 years until leaving service in 1648.

In 1618 he attended the Overijssel Synod in Vollenhove and was chosen there to represent Overijssel in the Synod of Dordrecht, though he returned to Deventer sick with fever in 1619. He was later chosen as revisor of the New Testament and Apocryphal gospels. In 1633–1634, he worked on the translation of the States Bible in the house of Antonius Walaeus, professor of religion, on the Rapenburg in Leiden. He was there along with the original living translators, and the paid observers:

1. as representative of Overijssel with the revisers of the New Testament were Henricus Arnoldi van der Linden, minister at Delft and son of the earlier translator, for South Holland,
2. Willem van Nieuwenhuizen (Guilhelmus Nieuhusius), rector of the school at Haarlem, for North Holland,
3. Karel Dematius (Carolus Dematius), minister at Middelburg, for Zeeland,
4. Ludovicus Gerardus à Renesse, minister at Maarsen, for Utrecht.

Appointed revisors who were unable to come that day:

1. Sebastian Damman, minister at Zutphen, who had also been one of the scribes at the Synod of Dordrecht, for Gelderland, due to imprisonment by the Spanish
2. Henricus Alting, who as professor of divinity at Heidelberg had also been called to the Synod of Dordrecht by the Elector Palatine, but was now professor of divinity at Groningen, for Groningen, due to travel in Germany
3. Bernardus Fullenius, minister at Leeuwarden, who was also one of the revisers of the Old Testament, for Friesland, due to being unable to get permission to travel to Leiden.

Sibelius died in Deventer.

== Works ==
- De sacrificio Abrahami. Daventr, 1624, Amsterdam, 1637
- De monomachiâ Jacobi cum Deo, Deventer, 1630
- Conciones sacrae in D. Judae epistolam, Amsterdam, 1631-1637
  - in Caput 16 Matthaei, Amsterdam, 1633
  - in historiam sanati lunatici, Amsterdam, 1634
- Homiliae 16 in historiam transformationis Christi, Amsterdam, 1634
- Commentarius in Psalmum 16, Amsterdam, 1635
- Mosis ars bellica contra Amalekitos, Amsterdam, 1637
- De dedrachmis et in Canticum Simeonis, Amsterdam, 1639
- Homiliae octo in Canticum Simeonis, Amsterdam, 1641
- In passionem, mortem et sepulturam Christi, Amsterdam, 1642
- Historia Hiskiae, regis Judae, lethaliter aegrotantis, divinitus sanati et erga Deum grati; seu caput 38 Esaiae Prophetae, homiliis 36 explicatum, 1643
- Conciones in 14 priorss versus 18 capitis Matthaei, Deventer, 1647, Amsterdam, 1669
- Schole der Goddelijke versoeckingen in 31 predicatien over de historie van Abrahams offerhande, Deventer, 1655
- Christianae precationes et gratiarum actiones, Deventer, 1658
- Christelycke ghebeden en dankzeggingen, Amsterdam, 1667
- Concionum anniversariarum in dies festos et dominicos tomi tres, Amsterdam, 1665
