= Caspar Coolhaes =

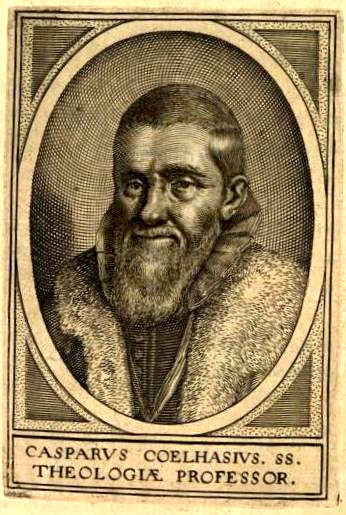
Caspar Janszoon Coelhaes in Alma Academia Leidensis

Caspar Coolhaes, or Koolhaas, (1536–1615) was a Reformed minister in the Netherlands and a libertine opponent of Calvinistic confessionalism.

Caspar Coolhaes was born in Cologne in 1536. He studied at Düsseldorf. In 1566 he joined the Reformation. He pastored in the regions of Zweibruck and Nassau. In 1574 he accepted a professorship at the new University of Leiden.

He became a noted figure in the 16th century in the Netherlands in the conflict between how the church and state should interact. An influx of strict Calvinists into Leiden lobbied for the church's freedom to deal harshly with heretics and impose punishments, while Protestants Coolhaes, Pieter Hackius, and others argued along with Thomas Erastus that it was right for the civil magistrates to maintain control over punishment and order, even in church matters. The dispute was engendered, in part, by the fear that the unfettered church could in theory create an increasingly totalitarian state with its own systems of punishments.

A provincial synod at Haarlem eventually excommunicated Coolhaes on 25 March 1582 when he refused to sign the Belgic Confession. However, the city government of Leiden subsidized Coolhaes until 1586. He eventually resigned the professorship at the University of Leiden, and died a private teacher at Leiden in 1615.

Because of his opposition to the Calvinist governmental model, opposition to the Calvinist doctrine of absolute predestination, Coolhaes' appeal for religious liberty, in combination with his professorship when Jacob Arminius was a student at Leiden, Coolhaes is considered by some as an important forerunner to Arminianism.
