= Carolus Fernández de Velasco =

Abbot of Grimbergen Abbey, 1647-1665

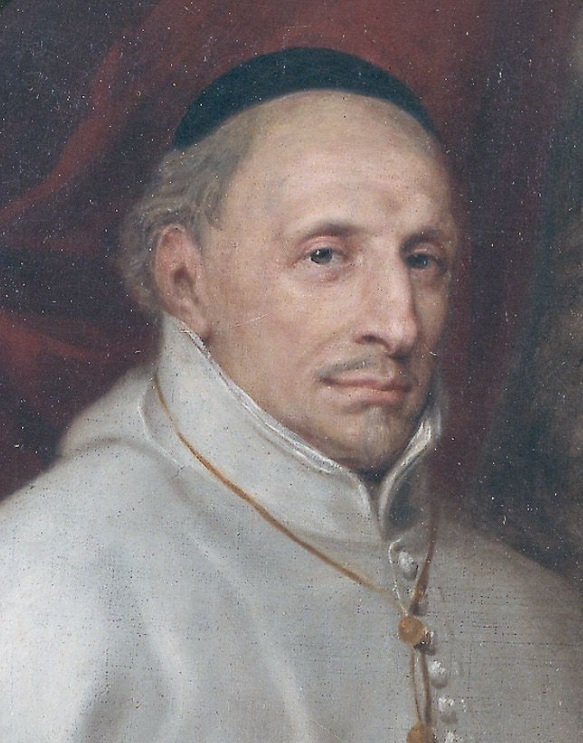
Portrait of Abbot de Velasco

don Carlos (Lat.: Carolus) Fernández de Velasco (1597–1665) was from 1647 to 1665 the 38th abbot of Grimbergen Abbey .

Born in Brussels to a Spanish noble family, the son of Don Santiago Carlos de Velasco and Joanne Gentry. He was related to Bernardino Fernández de Velasco, 6th Duke of Frías.

Abbot de Velasco was elected in 1647, and his election was confirmed by Emperor Leopold II. In 1652 he presided over the election of Norbertus van Couwerven as abbot of St. Michael's Abbey, Antwerp. In 1662 he received the vows of Daniel Bellemans, a monk, poet and missionary.

In 1660 Velasco commissioned a new abbey church for Grimbergen, which was almost completed at his death. During his period as abbot multiple buildings were erected. Sanderus referred to him in a text. He died on 13 October 1665.
