= Lucas Trelcatius =

Dutch theologian (1542–1602)

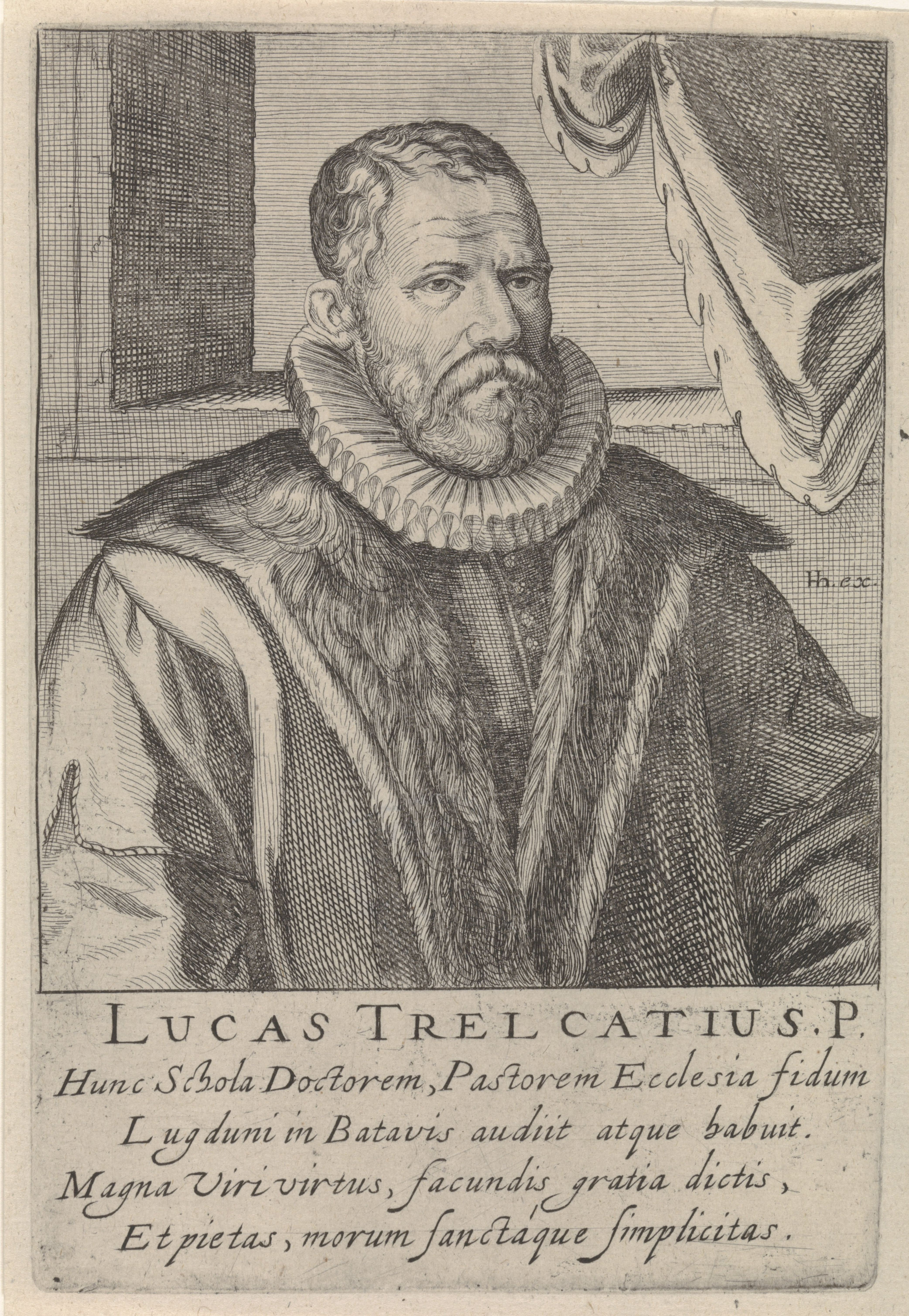
Lucas Trelcatius in Simon Frisius' book on Dutch reformers

Lucas Trelcatius (1542 – 1602), was a theologian and writer from the Northern Netherlands.

== Biography ==
Trelcatius was born in Atrecht (Arras) but raised as a clerical scholar in Douai thanks to his aunt who was mater in a nunnery there. When he came of age, he traveled to France where he studied theology in Paris and Orleans. In Orleans he became disillusioned with corruption in the Catholic church and turned to Protestantism. Losing his stipend from his Catholic aunt, he found aid from some merchants from Rijsel (Lille) who offered to support his studies in return for preaching the Protestant faith in their town. His position as a Protestant scholar became impossible to maintain however, and he felt compelled to leave France altogether and fled to London. There he started a family and became a Latin teacher, but when his former sponsors recalled him to Lille, he became a preacher in Antwerp so that he could serve in Rijsel. He was in Rijsel only for a short period before the troubles of the reformation forced him northwards, and he first moved to Brussels and onwards to Antwerp, and finally fled to the Northern Netherlands in 1585 and settled in Leiden, where he became full professor in 1587, in addition to serving the Walloon community as preacher. He died in the Leiden plague epidemic of 1602. His son Lucas Trelcatius the younger replaced him as preacher and professor in 1603, but died himself in 1607 after publishing Institutiones Theologicae.
