= Carolus Gallus =

Gallus, Carolus (or Karel de Haan) (16 August 1530 in Arnhem – 28 January 1616 in Nijbroek) was a Reformed minister and polemicist against the Anabaptists. Native to the Netherlands, Gallus was raised in a Roman Catholic family, and studied law and theology to become a priest.

== Life ==
As a Roman Catholic preparing to study for the priesthood, and against the warnings of his friend Joannes Visser, Carolus Gallus chose to study theology under John Calvin and Theodore de Beze at the Genevan Academy.

In early 1560, he became a priest at Deventer, though by February 1561, he was sued by dean of Deventer and brought under charges of heresy due to his administration of the Eucharist during a Christmas Mass. The city kept him in his position until June 1561, when he fled to the city of Hamm. He was appointed as Evangelical pastor by the Duke of Cleves and remained in this position until 1576. He moved to Bremen for a brief time and became a bitter opponent to the Anabaptists. He published his first book against the Anabaptists entitled Lehre de Christelicken geloovens in veer boecken tegen den wedertöpern erdömmen (Bremen, 1577 ?). From 1578 to 1581, at the behest of Count Johan Nassau, he was a military chaplain with his friend Johannes Fontanus in Gelderland, where the Reformation was beginning to take hold.

Between the years of 1583 and 1586, he ministered once again in Deventer, but once again had to flee as Roman Catholics from Spain who infiltrated the city. He was appointed as professor of theology at the University of Leiden in 1587 and maintained this position rather shortly, as he took a call to become minister in Oldenbroek in 1592, where he remained until his death.

== Chief works ==
- Lehre de Christelicken geloovens in veer boecken tegen den wedertöpern erdömmen. Bremen, 1577(?).
- Exegetica adversus catabaptistas: effte gruendtlike und uthuqeorlike vorklaringe. 1577.
- Clavis prophetica nova apocatypseos, Joannis apostoli et evangeliographi. 1592.
- Accesserunt theses de antichristo, & tractatus de magistratu. Apoc. 22 vers 10. Lugd. Bat. 1592.
- De febribus pestilentibus, ac malignis, tractatus bipartitus. In quo elegantissima & copiosa alexipharmaca usuque comprobata per eumdem acurate examinantur. Nec non quaestio an venae sectio cucurbitule hyrudines vel scarificationes conveniant in dictis febribus authoritatib. eximiorum virorum absolvitur. Ferrariae, Apud Victorium Baldinum, 1600.
- Malleus Anabaptistarum Een hamer op dat hoeft aller Wederdoperschen secten. Arnhem: Jan Janssen, 1606.
- Brevis responsio ad solutiones ad solutiones datas ad Adversariis ad argumenta Maccovii. Franeker, 1642.
