= Conrad Vorstius =

Dutch theologian (1569–1622)

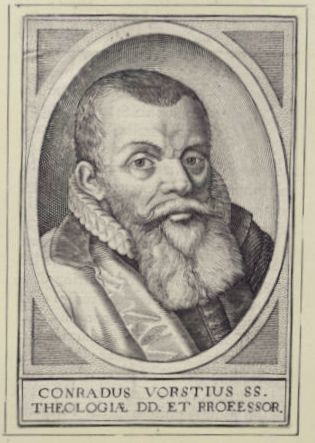
- Vorstius, 1616 engraving
- Born: 19 July 1569; Free Imperial City of Cologne
- Died: 29 September 1622 (aged 53); Tönning, Duchy of Schleswig
- Other names: Konrad von der Vorst, Conradus Vorstius
- Education: University of Heidelberg
- Scientific career
- Workplaces: Leiden University
- Academic advisors: Johannes Piscator
- Doctoral students: Franciscus Sylvius

Conrad Vorstius (German: Konrad von der Vorst; Latin: Conradus Vorstius; 19 July 1569 – 29 September 1622) was a German-Dutch controversial Remonstrant theologian, successor to Jacobus Arminius in the theology chair at Leiden University, and—as a theologian—second to Johannes Uytenbogaert in the Remonstrant Society. His appointment, and the controversy surrounding it, became an international matter in the political and religious affairs of the United Provinces during the Twelve Years' Truce, supplying a pretext for the irregular intervention of King James I of England in those affairs. Vorstius published theological views which were taken by some to show sympathy with the Socinians, and was declared unworthy of his office by the Calvinists at the Synod of Dort in 1619.

== Early life ==
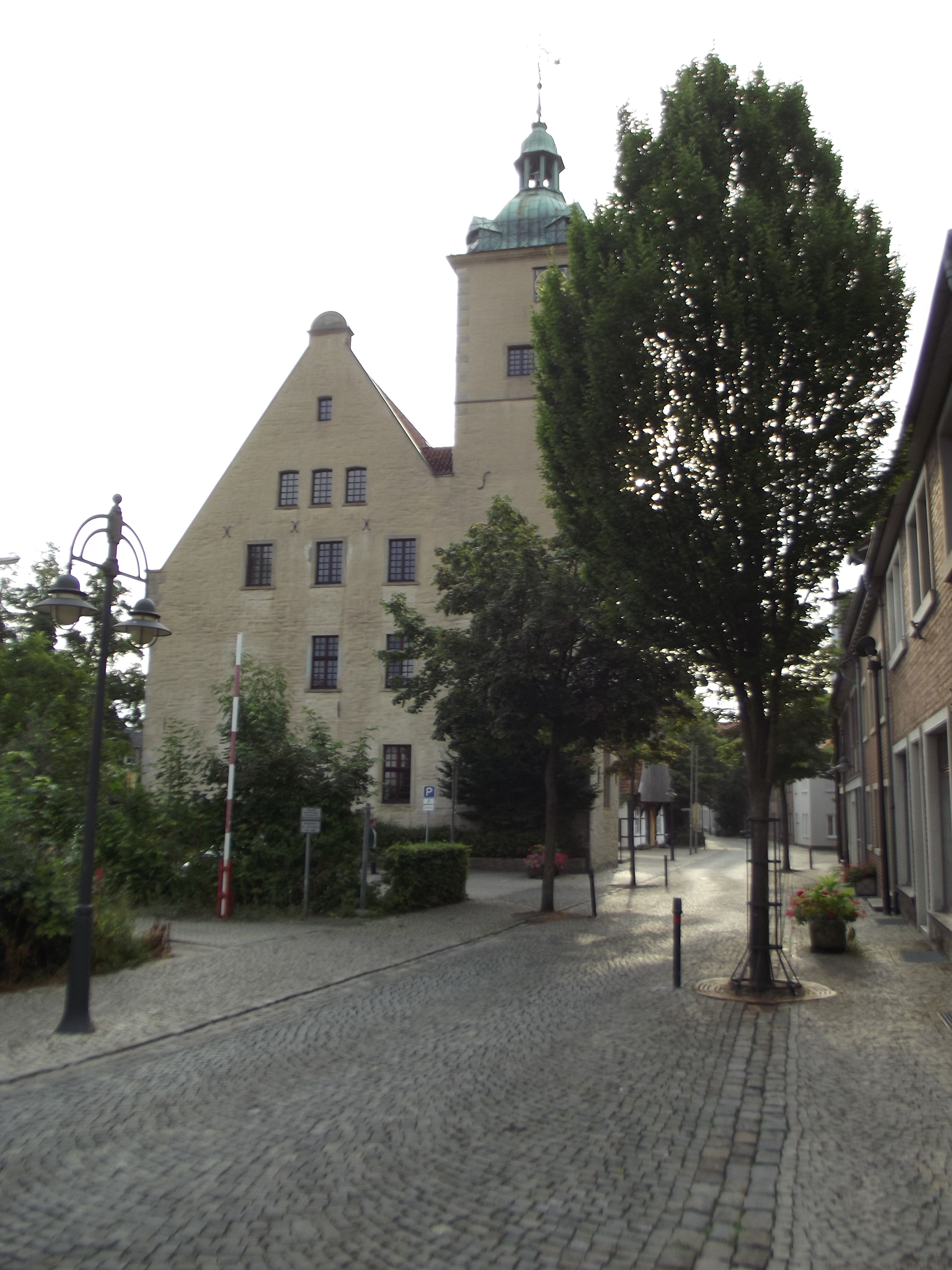
The Hohe Schule in Burgsteinfurt, where Vorstius was a professor before he moved to Leiden

Vorstius was born one of ten children at Cologne on 19 July 1569. His parents Theodor Vorstius and his wife Sophia Starckia were Roman Catholic and wanted him to become a Catholic priest, but the parents converted to Protestant belief before he could undertake these studies. He received the rudiments of his education at Bedburdyck (Jüchen, Germany) for five years, before studying at Düsseldorf from 1583 to 1587, and also at Aix-la-Chapelle. He entered the college of St. Lawrence in Cologne, where he should have taken his Bachelor's and master's degrees, but was unable in conscience to take the required oath of obedience to the decrees of the Council of Trent.

His parents not having much money, he went into practical affairs as a Purchaser for two years, where he learnt to serve the business and acquired skills in reckoning and in French and Italian. In 1589 he took up his studies once more and entered the Herborn Academy from 1589 until 1593, where he devoted himself fully to Theology under Johannes Piscator. He had not neglected his Philosophical studies, however, having often taken part in theological and philosophical disputations there. In 1590-1591 he began to take private pupils, instructing the sons of dignitaries who afterwards held him in friendship. He proceeded to Heidelberg on 12 April 1593, focusing on theology on 12 April 1594, and he was publicly created and declared a Doctor of Theology (SS. Theologiae Doctor) on 4 July 1594.

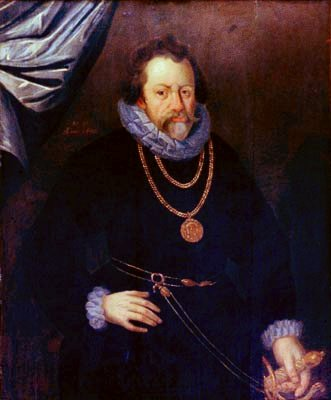
Graf Arnold von Bentheim-Steinfurt (died 1606)

In December 1595 he travelled with two companions to Basel and Geneva, where he attended lectures by Theodore Beza, and earned a considerable reputation for himself. His disputations De Sacramentis (Basel, 1595) and De Causis Salutis (1595) won him the offer of a position as teacher for 120 crowns a year, with the approval of Beza and of Johann Jakob Grynaeus. Vorstius, however, decided to return to his own country, and went instead to Burgsteinfurt in 1596, in the County of Bentheim where, thanks to a recommendation from Beza and David Pareus, he taught at Graf von Bentheim's Hohe Schule for fifteen years. In Burgsteinfurt Vorstius defended the Reformed religion against the Catholic theologian Robert Bellarmine. He also received offers of teaching positions at Saumur and Marburg, but was unable or unwilling to leave the service of the Bentheims.

At about this time, by 1597, Vorstius married and embarked upon fatherhood. It was in Burgsteinfurt that his publications De Praedestinatione (Burgsteinfurt, 1597), De Sancta Trinitate (1597), and De Persona et Officio Christi (1597) brought him under suspicion of Socinianism: his patron advised him to clear himself of the charge, and in 1599 he travelled to Heidelberg for that purpose and successfully defended his orthodoxy before the theological faculty there. After this he was fully reinstated and advanced in Burgsteinfurt, in 1605 receiving the additional appointments of preacher, and Consistorial Assessor.

== At Leiden ==
In the context of the commencement of the Twelve Years' Truce in 1609, Vorstius published a treatise against Cardinal Bellarmine in 1610. Following the death of Arminius, which created a vacancy in the Theology chair at Leiden, in 1610 Vorstius accepted a calling to succeed him. He was "praised enthusiastically by indisputably orthodox divines at Heidelberg and Arnhem as worthy of the post". He was nominated for the chair by moderate members of the Remonstrant party who approved of his support for public freedom of opinion, "having defended the toleration of diverse opinions in his book against Bellarmine." It was hoped he would also be acceptable to some of the Contra-Remonstrants, on account of his orthodox background. His acceptance of the appointment, however, gave offence to the Count of Bentheim, and he made an Apology (a Declaration) to the university concerning his beliefs and practises.

Vorstius was a very troubling kind of academic, who could challenge fundamental tenets of scholastic theology. He presented such arguments without endorsing them as points of belief, for example that the divine essence, if (considered as a body, in the broadest meaning of that term) it had extent and magnitude, could not also be infinite. Similarly (regarding Predestination), whereas future outcomes were conditional upon elective actions in the present, the Deity given to managing human affairs must not also have full fore-knowledge of them: hence the divine will, though essential in itself, in its contingent or arbitrary operations might be mutable, and not uniform in its motions. In 1610 he reprinted his Tractatus Theologicus de Deo, sive de Natura et Attributis Dei: Decem Disputationes, which had first seen the light in 1606, and was dedicated to Maurice, Landgrave of Hesse-Kassel.

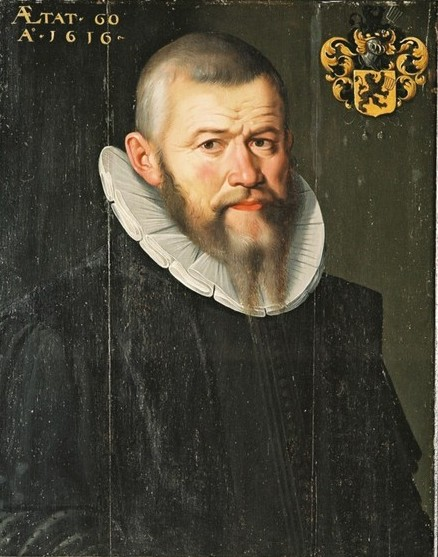
Sibrand Lubbert in 1616

The appointment of Vorstius (a prerogative of the magistrates) gave the opponents of Arminius the opportunity to make a political intervention in the name of the defence of the Christian religion. His teaching appeared heterodox and deeply sceptical, seeming to stray from Christianity, even from Theism altogether. His statements in the Tractatus led the Counter-Remonstrants to accuse him of sympathy for, and encouragement of, the loathed Socinian heterodoxy, a system questioning the Triune and eternal nature of God. In 1611 therefore he gave answer in his Epitome Exegeseos Apologeticae.

The publication of a suppressed work of Socinus, De Auctoritate S. Scripturae, in 1611, in translation into Latin, provoked more severe condemnation, though Vorstius denied having imported Socinian works into the region, and claimed to have been ignorant of its authorship. Christopher Sandius listed this production with its preface among the works of Vorstius. For his part, Vorstius claimed he did not advocate such views, but found it necessary to explain them to students who came to him wishing to understand why teachers such as Sibrandus Lubbertus (Professor of Theology at the University of Franeker 1585–1625) were so agitated against them. Vorstius appealed to freedom of understanding, and rather blamed Lubbertus for arousing interest in these questions by his attempting to suppress discussion of them.

In autumn 1611 Vorstius received glowing testimonials from the Bentheims and from the Senate of the Steinfurt Gymnasium. As the controversy grew, "his appointment became a symbolic cause in the struggle between the two parties [Remonstrants and Contra-Remonstrants] in church and state. Oldenbarnevelt and Uytenbogaert, the leaders of the Remonstrants, were committed to the appointment of Vorstius, which would ensure that an exponent of the Arminian-Remonstrant point of view would continue to be heard at Leiden." Lubbertus, who led the opposition to Vorstius, was described by Simon Episcopius as being of "more than feminine imbecility". Claiming that true religion was under assault, Lubbertus blamed the magistrates for perpetuating religious divisions unhealthy for the States. He lodged official protests with the states of Holland and West-Friesland, and attempted to bring the Anglicans into his cause by communicating with the Archbishop of Canterbury and other English divines, inviting the intervention of King James I of England.

== Intervention of King James I of England ==
In 1612 King James made public a substantial text embodying his various dealings with the United Provinces in the case of Vorstius over the preceding two years. He first outlined the events that had aroused his opposition:

"In Autumne last [1611], about the end of August, ... there came to our hands two bookes of the said Vorstius, the one intituled Tractatus Theologicus de Deo, dedicated to the Lantgraue of Hessen, imprinted in the yeere 1610, the other his Exegesis Apologetica vpon that booke, dedicated to the States, and printed in the yeere 1611. Which books, as soone as we had receiued, ... we stayed not one houre, but dispatched a letter presently to our Ambassadour resident with the States"

Through his ambassador Sir Ralph Winwood, James at once urged the States-General to expel Vorstius as a heretic. He later sought to justify his intervention in this controversy in aliena republica as follows:

"If the subject of Vorstius' Heresies had not been grounded upon Questions of a higher qualitie than the number and nature of the Sacraments, or the points of Iustification, of Merits, of Purgatorie, of the visible head of the Church, or any such matters, as are in controversie at this day betwixt the Papists and us; Nay more, if he had medled onely with the nature and works of GOD ad extra, (as the Schoolemen speake,) If hee had soared no higher pitch; we doe freely professe, that in that case we should never haue troubled ourselues with the businesse in such fashion, and with that fervencie as hitherto we haue done. But this Vorstius, ... confounding infinitie, (one of the proper attributes of God,) and immensitie, (sometime applied to creatures,) the essence and substance, with the hypostasis, disputing of a first and second creation, immediate and mediate, making God to be quale and quantum, changing eternitie, into eviternitie, teaching eternitie to consist of a number of aages, and in the head as a sworne enemie not onely to Divinitie, but even to all Philosophie, both humane and naturall, denying God to be Actus purus, and void of qualities, but having in some sort (with horror be it spoken)... some kind of diversitie or multiplicitie in himselfe, yea even a beginning of a certain mutabilitie; Let the world then iudge whether we had not occasion hereupon, to be moved, ... as a Christian at large; yea, euen as a Theist, or a man that acknowledgeth a GOD, or as a Platonique Philosopher at the least."

=== A matter of State ===
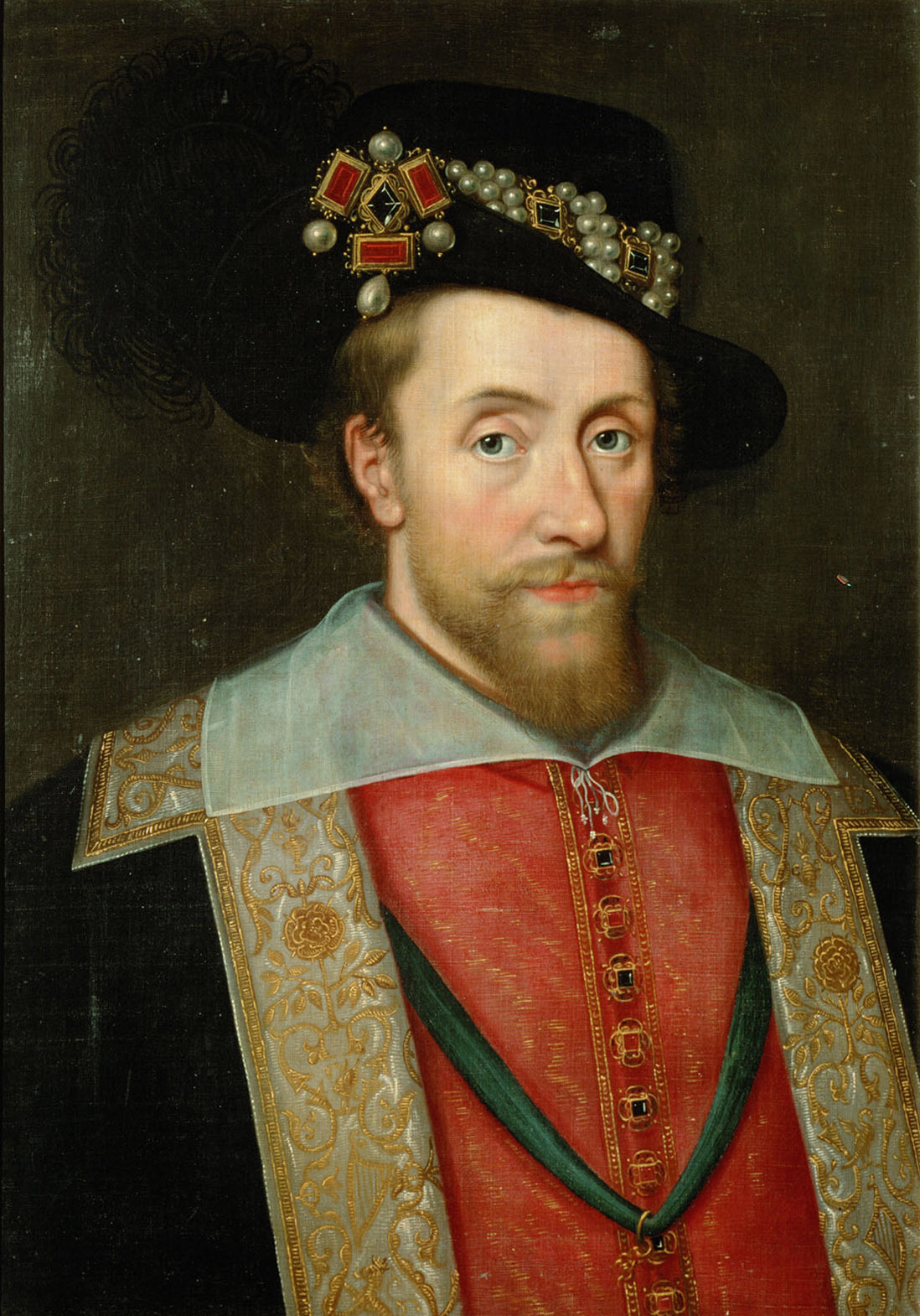
King James I of England and VI of Scotland, 1605

This and other messages formed a series of dispatches that were exchanged between James and the States General. Johan van Oldenbarnevelt thanked the ambassador for the king's "princely affection" and promised the proposal would be considered. The response contained little to appease James, amounting rather to a resolve to conduct their own affairs without the intermeddling of a foreign nation in Dutch religious matters. Their experience of the bloody persecutions inflicted by the Roman Catholics during the Dutch War of Independence was not about to be forgotten. James had Vorstius's books burned at London (at Paul's Cross), and at Oxford and Cambridge. In his own kingdom James showed toleration towards forms of private worship, but allowed no public preaching in opposition to his religious policies.

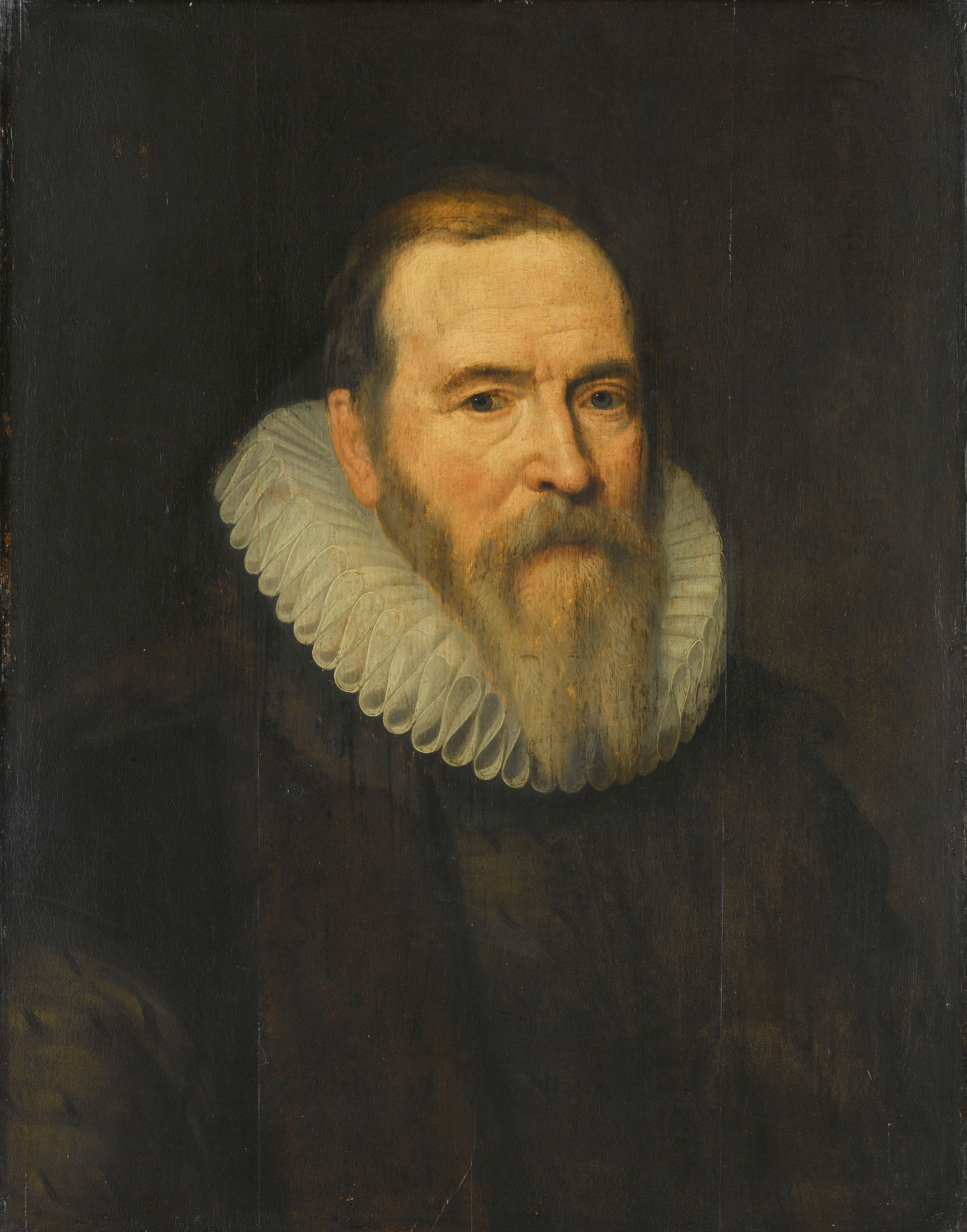
Johan van Oldenbarnevelt (by Mierevelt)

Stung by what he termed the "coldness" of the Assembly's reply, James (calling Vorstius a "Cockatrice egg" and a "snake in the grass") responded that if they did not expel him, the amity between their countries was endangered. In a letter to Robert Cecil, Winwood cast the contest as between those "who sincerely do affectionate, the profession of the one only true religion" and those who hold "that the strength of their state, chiefly does consist, in maintaining Religion to be professed in a certain Latitude, the bounds whereof they enlarge, and restrain, at the humor and appetite of every particular man's fantasy".

Winwood's lengthy address to the Assembly at The Hague argued that the case against Vorstius's appointment was both political and religious: since some authorities (such as Holland) opposed it, the appointment would threaten the unity of the Provinces. It was further urged (or threatened) that the United Provinces had avoided complete suppression by Spain as a mark of divine favour for their part in the advancement of true religion, but that this appointment might incur the loss of that favour. The king sent a list of sentences drawn directly from Vorstius, to exemplify the statements which he found objectionable.

This correspondence between the two nations being made known to the world in 1612, James also recruited the ex-Catholic Richard Sheldon and the Catholic juror William Warmington to write against Vorstius. In 1613 Sir Dudley Carleton asked Paolo Sarpi to assess the views of Vorstius. Sarpi delivered a double-edged report, hitting at all reformers, with barely-veiled criticism of James's interventions and of his mixing of religious and political concerns.

== Opposition and exile ==
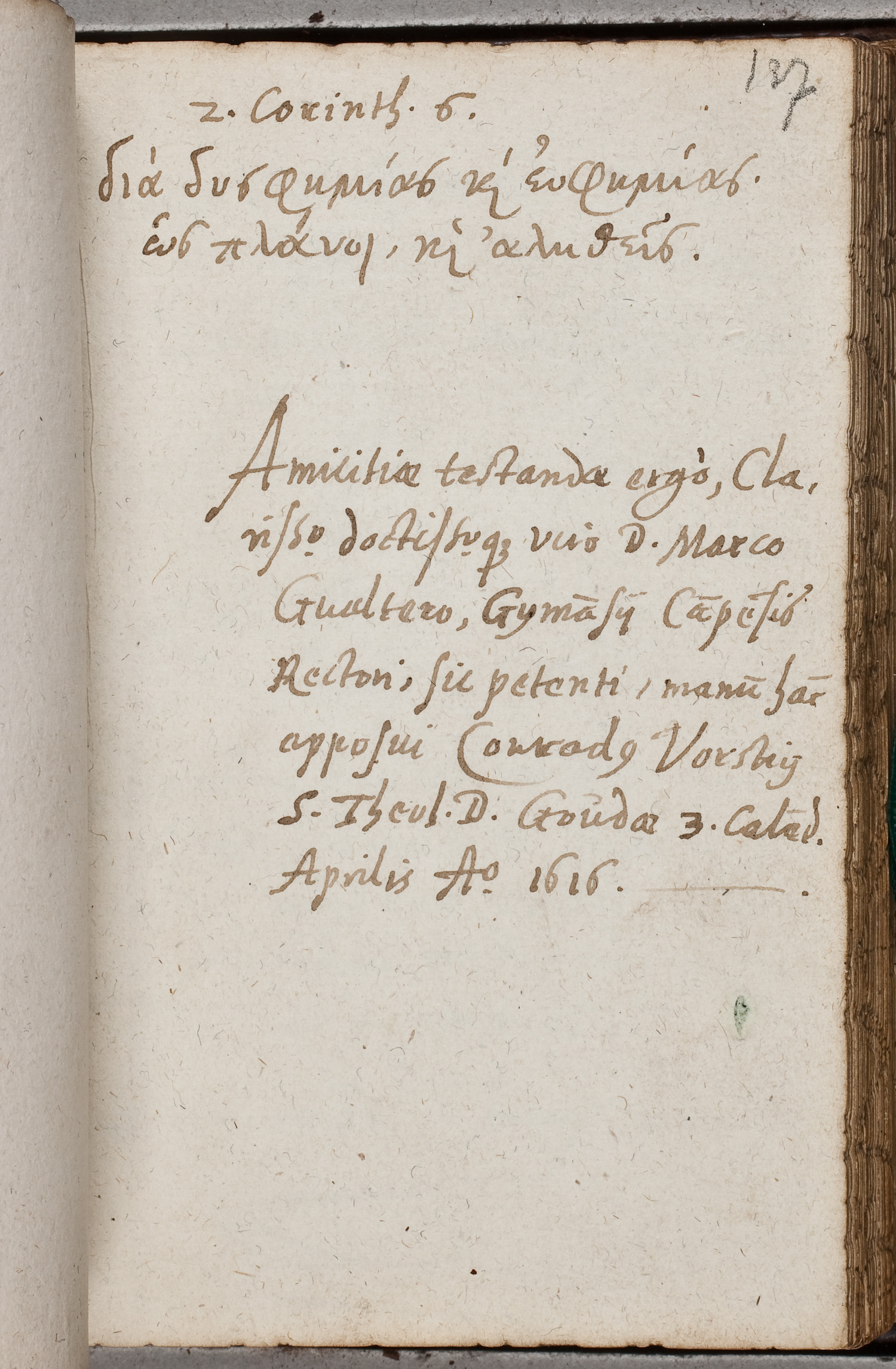
The friendship-book of Marcus Gualtherus: Vorstius in 1616 quotes II Corinthians 6, vs 8, defending their ministry "through evil report and good report; as deceivers, and yet true".

Vorstius responded to the English condemnations in his Christiana ac modesta responsio (1611), but the States-General felt obliged to dismiss him, though continuing his salary, in 1612. He settled as an exile in Gouda, about May 1612. Attacks on Vorstius continued, and he pleaded his own cause in a series of polemics. Piscator addressed an Amica Collatio, a volume of notes, to Vorstius in 1613, taking issue with him "candidly, placidly and modestly" (and extensively). In Piscator's eyes, Vorstius fell from being "his spiritual son" to being "his degenerate son, from whom he experienced nothing but misery." Hugo Grotius, in his Ordinum Hollandiae ac Westfrisiae pietas of 1613, defended the right of the civil authorities to appoint whomsoever they wished to the university faculty: the States could not be organized on religious principles, and their rights were independent of religious learning or beliefs. Vorstius published a response to Piscator from Gouda in 1617, and another to the Contra-Remonstrant Festus Hommius in 1618.

=== Banishment and death ===
The Twelve Years' Truce with Spain agreed in 1609, which had opened the way for these events, was due to expire in 1621. That prospect lent urgency to the settlement of these debates, which reached a culmination in 1619. The assault on Vorstius, still led by Lubbertus, led to his condemnation as a heretic, and the decree of his banishment, issued at the Synod of Dort. King James I again applied considerable pressure through his delegates, and when it appeared that the synod did not intend to banish Vorstius he sent Sir Dudley Carleton in his name to the Prince of Orange in person to demand it.

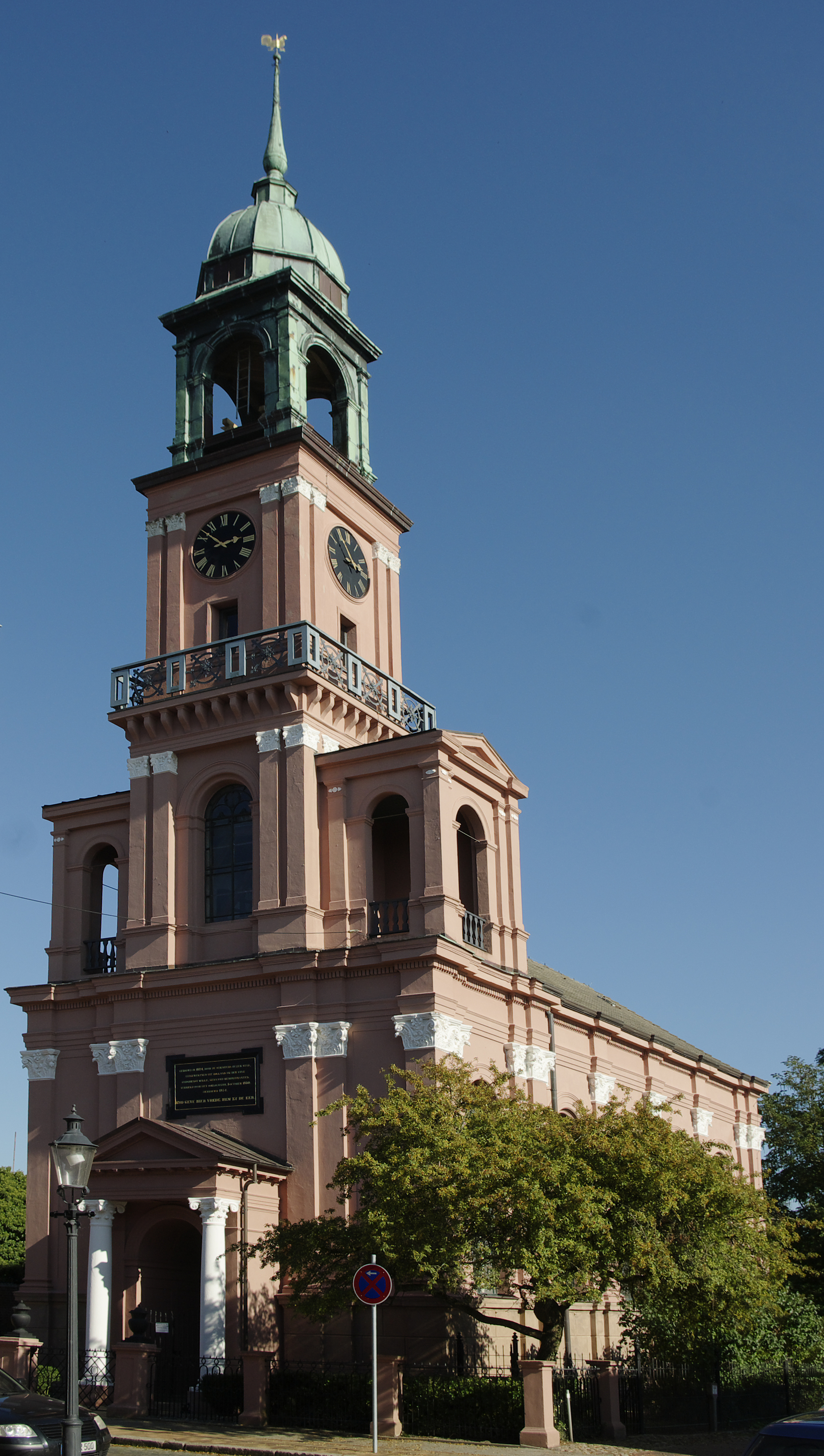
The Remonstrant Church at Friedrichstadt which arose at the site of Vorstius's tomb.

The sentence of the synod, under the presidency of Johannes Bogerman, referred to "his dissolute licence in Scepticall questioning of the principall heads of Christian religion, his slippery, doubtfull and winding maner of teaching... pernicious to Gods Church, ill befitting such high and sacred matter...; his doctrine... in no wise to be tolerated in Churches and Schooles, but to be thence banished and rooted out, with detestation". He was stripped of his professorship and functions in the University of Leiden and given six weeks to leave Holland and West-Friesland. At much the same time, in May 1619, Johan van Oldenbarnevelt was executed at The Hague.

Vorstius left Gouda and remained in hiding, mostly in the area of Utrecht. In 1622 Frederick III, Duke of Holstein-Gottorp offered him a refuge. It is told that on his deathbed he dictated a testament of faith to Herboldus Tombergius, which was afterwards held by the Socinians to show his adherence to their beliefs. The controversial sections of his alleged statement read as follows: “…I acknowledge His only-begotten Son, Jesus Christ, as that same Creator and Saviour, whom we ought to adore and worship with the highest and most perfect reverence, as Him to whom all authority in heaven and on earth has been given, and under whose feet God, His heavenly Father, has placed all things—excluding only Him who subjected all things to Him. Accordingly, there is nothing in all creation that is not bound to adore Him with the highest divine honor imaginable…If now anyone should attempt to misuse my modest authority, I hereby solemnly declare, as I have done before, that I distinguish between the Lord Jesus, the Son of God, our only and eternal Saviour, and Him who is the only true and almighty God—this in full accord with the words and meaning of the Holy Spirit, as so frequently expressed in the New Testament.” Despite accusations of Socinianism both during his life and after, Vorstius continually stated that whatever was contained in the Remonstrant Confession—an explicitly trinitarian confession—was true, even during his banishment, and presumably on his deathbed, as he explicitly stated that his beliefs there were ones which he had “solemnly declared before.” Though said to be a Socinian, a semi-Arian, or even a full blown adoptionist by some scholars, his own words say otherwise. In his Tractatus de Deo, he said "These things, therefore, concerning the person of the Mediator, concerning His kingdom and mediatorial dominion (so to speak), must be understood. For God as God [the Father], that is, considered in His own absolute majesty, neither receives His dominion from anyone, nor does He acquire it as a reward, namely, on account of preceding obedience, nor can He return or relinquish it to anyone. For by His very nature, He is both God and the supreme Lord of all, and entirely independent-even of Christ Himself, as Christ, who is God and Lord, the head: just as it is written in Eph. 1:17, 1 Cor. 3:21, 11:3, Matt. 12:19, Acts 4:27, and other Scriptures. Meanwhile, the true and eternal divinity of Christ is not diminished; but rather, it [that is, Christ's subordination] is only a matter of speech in Scripture about the Mediator Himself, where His subordination to God the Father is more fully explained, in order that the mystery of our salvation, accomplished through Christ, may be made clearer to us." Further, in his 1620 work (publ. 1632) Fidei Christianae Delineatio Brevis, vol. 1, he says "God is distinctly one in three hypostases, namely, the Father, the Son, and the Holy Spirit. Of these, the Father, being unbegotten, communicates His deity to the others; the only-begotten Son receives the same wholly from the Father through an ineffable generation; and the Holy Spirit, proceeding from both, obtains the same from both." In spite of his clear trinitarianism, his opponents were not satisfied. Vorstius often employed distinctions within the Godhead that even some Remonstrants, like Uytenbogaert, thought were too speculative. One of the most controversial ones was his view of “essences.” He posited a distinction between the divine essence as such and proper essences that are constitutive of each person. He also, as seen in both his 1610 Tractatus and his alleged deathbed confession, affirmed a sort of functional subordination of the personal, proper essences within the Godhead (with the Father alone being autotheos and the source of all divinity). Further, his view on Christ’s satisfaction was also a source of trouble for many. He denied the strict Reformed penal substitutionary model and instead opted for one in which Christ suffered only an approximate similarity to the universal debt of guilt for sins, and not necessarily as a punishment. Things like these were seen as troubling tendencies to both the Reformed of his day and some of the Remonstrants. Even so, his turbulent life ended as he died at Tönning on 29 September 1622.

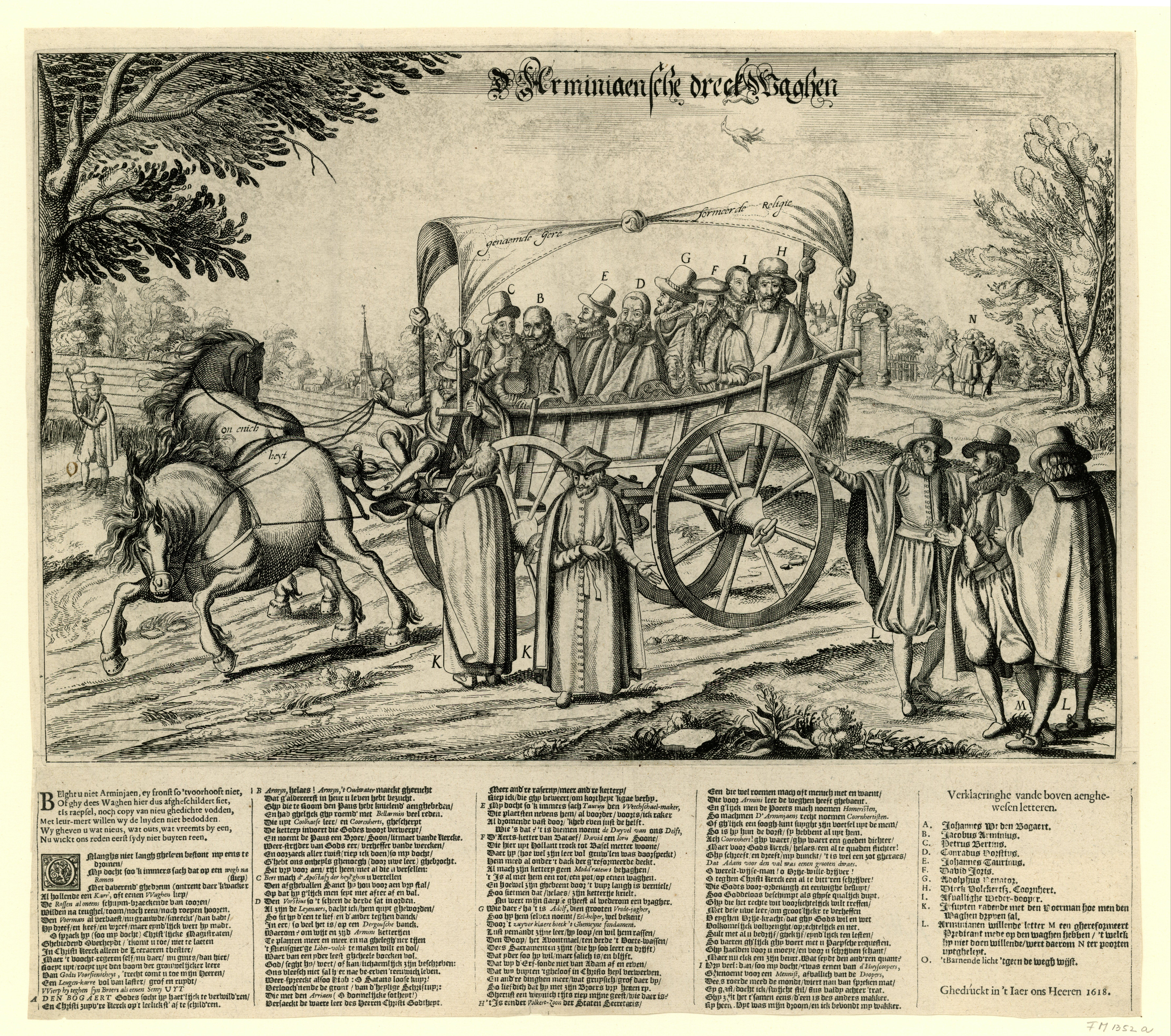
"The Arminians' Muck-Cart" (Print, 1618). Vorstius is shown at letter "D".

At his funeral in Friedrichstadt (Frederiksstad) the oration was read by Marcus Gualtherus, whose Book of Friendship Vorstius had inscribed in 1616. He said of Vorstius's last years, that they were passed in constant moving from house to house to avoid discovery by his persecutors, always having to make sure there was a ladder so that he could escape through the upstairs windows. Gualtherus himself, Rector of Kampen in Overijssel, had been obliged to leave that town in 1621 on account of his friendly contacts with Vorstius and Episcopius. The Oration was published in 1624. The Remonstrant Church in Friedrichstadt arose on the site of his grave.

== Family ==
The marriage of Vorstius is referred to as having recently occurred, in a letter of 14 January 1599 from his friend Christoph Pezelius.

- His son Adolph Vorstius (Delft, 1597 – Leiden, 1663) became professor in medicine at the Leiden University in 1636.
- His son Willem Hendrijk Vorstius (d. 1 October 1652), who studied rabbinical literature, was Remonstrant preacher at Leiden after 1642, and was also suspected of Socinianism. (Adolph and Wilhelm Heinrich were Bentheim names.)
- Another son, Guernerus (died March 1682), was also a Remonstrant preacher at Dokkum in 1632, but was banished for five years in 1634. In the following year he returned, only to be arrested and banished again, after which he was a preacher at Hoorn (1641), Leiden (1653), and Rotterdam (1658), where he became pastor emeritus in 1680. Guernerus edited his father's Doodsteek der Calvinistische prasdestinate.
  - Descendants of Vorstius were preachers in Dutch Remonstrant churches for a century.

== Notes ==
Academic offices
Preceded by Jacobus Arminius	Chair of theology at the University of Leiden; 1611–1612	Succeeded by Simon Episcopius
