= Richard Sheldon =

Richard Sheldon may refer to:

- Richard Sheldon (athlete) (1878–1935), American athlete and Olympian
- Richard Sheldon (controversialist) (died 1642), English clergyman

== See also ==
- Richard Sheldon Palais (born 1931), American mathematician
