= Eduard Alberti =

German literary historian and philosopher

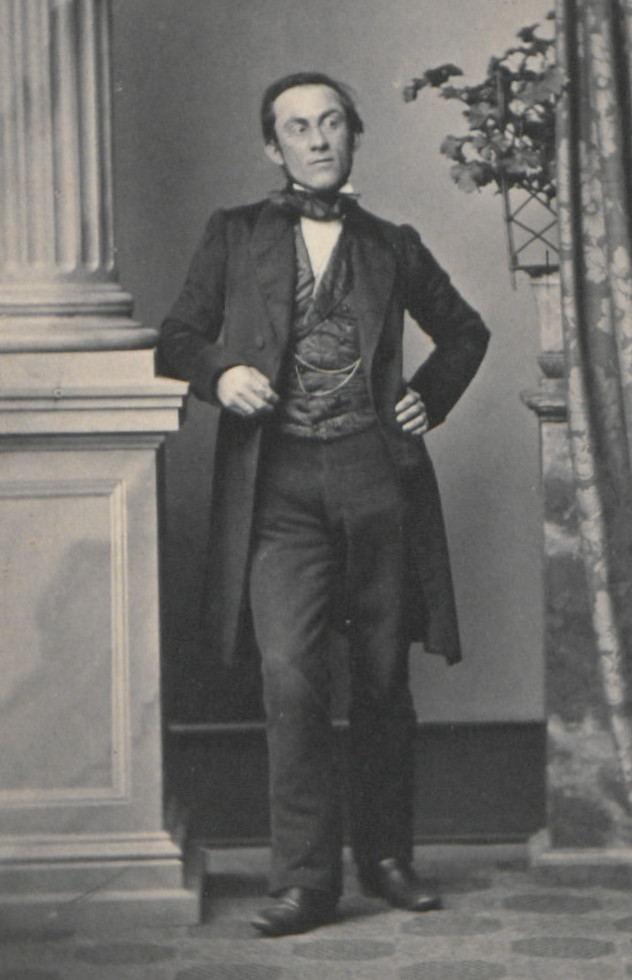
Portrait photo of Eduard Alberti

Eduard Alberti (11 March 1827 – 28 February 1898) was a German literary historian and philosopher. His surviving published output includes approximately twenty biographical entries in Allgemeine Deutsche Biographie.

== Life ==
Eduard Christian Scharlau Alberti was born in Friedrichstadt, at that time in the Duchy of Schleswig, then part of Denmark. He attended school in his hometown and then, between 1844 and Easter 1848, undertook a training in printing and book production ("Buchdruck"). He then returned to school, switching to a Gelehrtenschule (Pre-university academy) in nearby Husum. In 1850, in further pursuit of his academic objectives, he enrolled at the University of Kiel where, primarily under the supervision of Peter Wilhelm Forchhammer, he studied classical philology, passing his final exams in the first part of 1854.

After this, till 1856 Alberti worked as a home tutor in Schwansen, employed by the family of the jurist-politician Magnus von Moltke. At the same time he worked on his doctorate (PhD) which he received in July 1856. In 1857, after a lengthy stay in Copenhagen, he received his habilitation (higher academic qualification), still from Kiel University. At the same time he was working as an assistant at the university library, where in 1868 he was promoted to the position of "deputy custos".

After receiving a "professor" title in 1893, Eduard Alberti entered retirement with effect from 1 April 1894. He lived his final few years in Voorde (Flintbek), just outside Kiel. He died at Voorde on 28 February 1898, a couple of weeks short of what would have been his seventy-first birthday.

Alberti's more enduring footprint on history results from his published output, notably a new edition of Lexicon of Writers in Schleswig-Holstein-Lauenburg and Eutin (German: Lexikons der Schleswig-Holstein-Lauenburgischen und Eutinischen Schriftsteller). He worked on Allgemeine Deutsche Biographie, to which he contributed approximately twenty articles for the volumes covering the letters B to E. He also wrote on his own account: his final work, produced jointly with his brother Leopold Alberti, was entitled Poems of Two Brothers (German: Gedichte zweier Brüder) and appeared in 1898 very shortly before his death.
