= Richard Sheldon (controversialist) =

Richard Sheldon (died 1642?) was a Church of England clergyman, a convert from Catholicism, known as a polemical writer.

== Life ==
From a Catholic family, and destined for the priesthood, he was sent during the pontificate of Pope Clement VIII to the English College, Rome. He returned to England, via Spain, and about 1610 he was imprisoned as a Jesuit. He then professed himself a Protestant, and was released. He was immediately employed by King James, together with William Warmington, another convert, to write a book against Conrad Vorstius. Subsequently he published several works against Catholicism on his own account.

For a time Sheldon enjoyed the royal favour. He was appointed a royal chaplain, and received the honorary degree of D.D. from Cambridge University. The negotiations for the Spanish match, however, inclined James to tolerance, and Sheldon's views on his old faith became distasteful. In 1622 he preached a sermon against those bearing the mark of the beast, for which he received a severe reprimand. He never regained his former position, though he endeavoured to propitiate Charles I by writing in defence of the royal prerogative. He died soon after 1641.

== Works ==
He published in 1611 The Lawfulness of the Oath of Allegiance, a moderate Catholic work on the oath of allegiance.

Besides sermons, he also published:

- 'Motives of R. S. for his Renunciation of Communion with the Bishop of Rome,' London, 1612.
- 'A Survey of the Miracles of the Church of Rome,' London, 1616.
- 'Man's Last End, or the Glorious Vision and Fruition of God,' London, 1634.
