= Friedrichstadt =

Friedrichstadt Frederiksstad
- Town
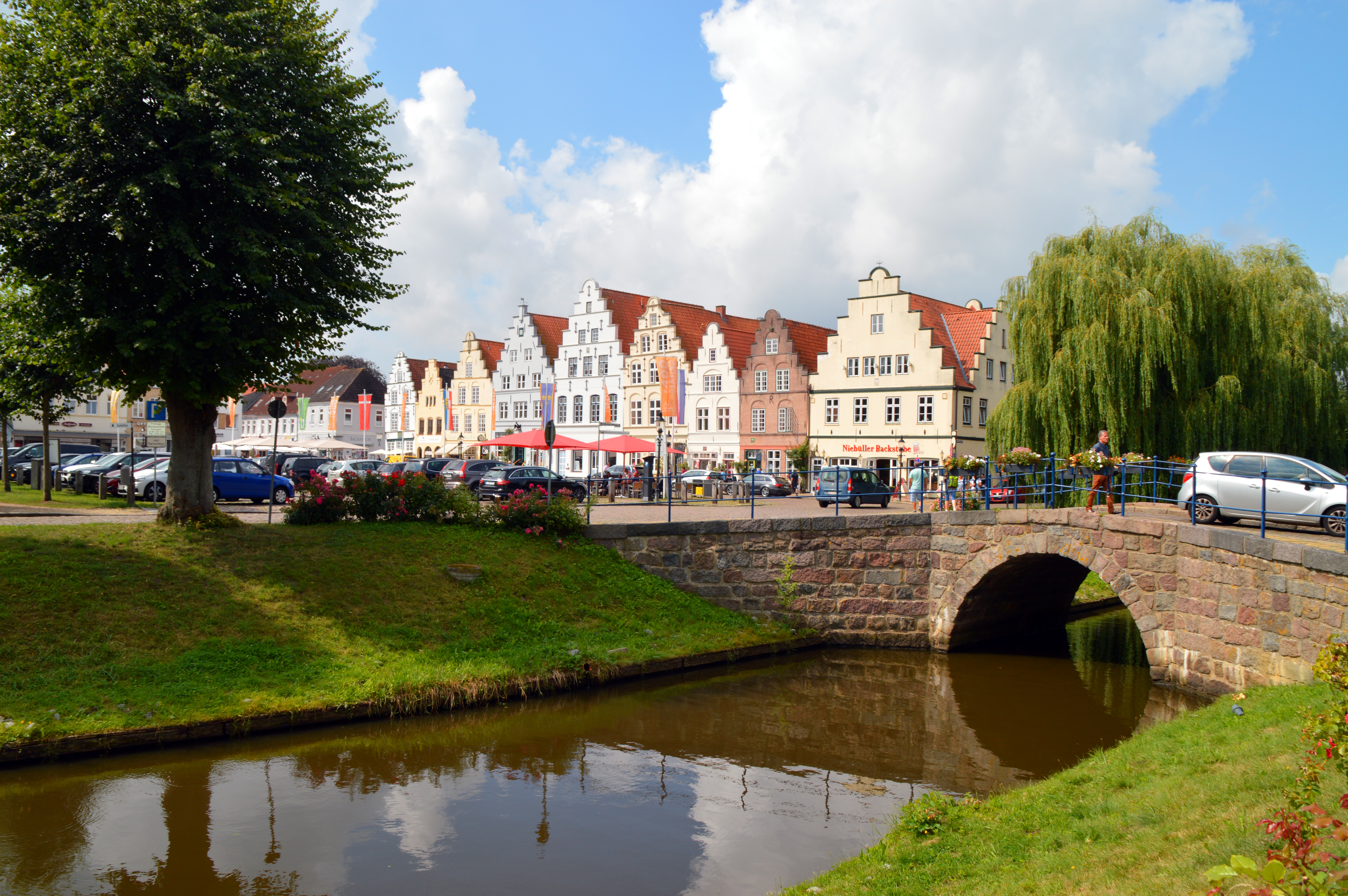
- Ensemble of all 9 houses with stepped gables ("Holländerhäuser") on the west side of the market place

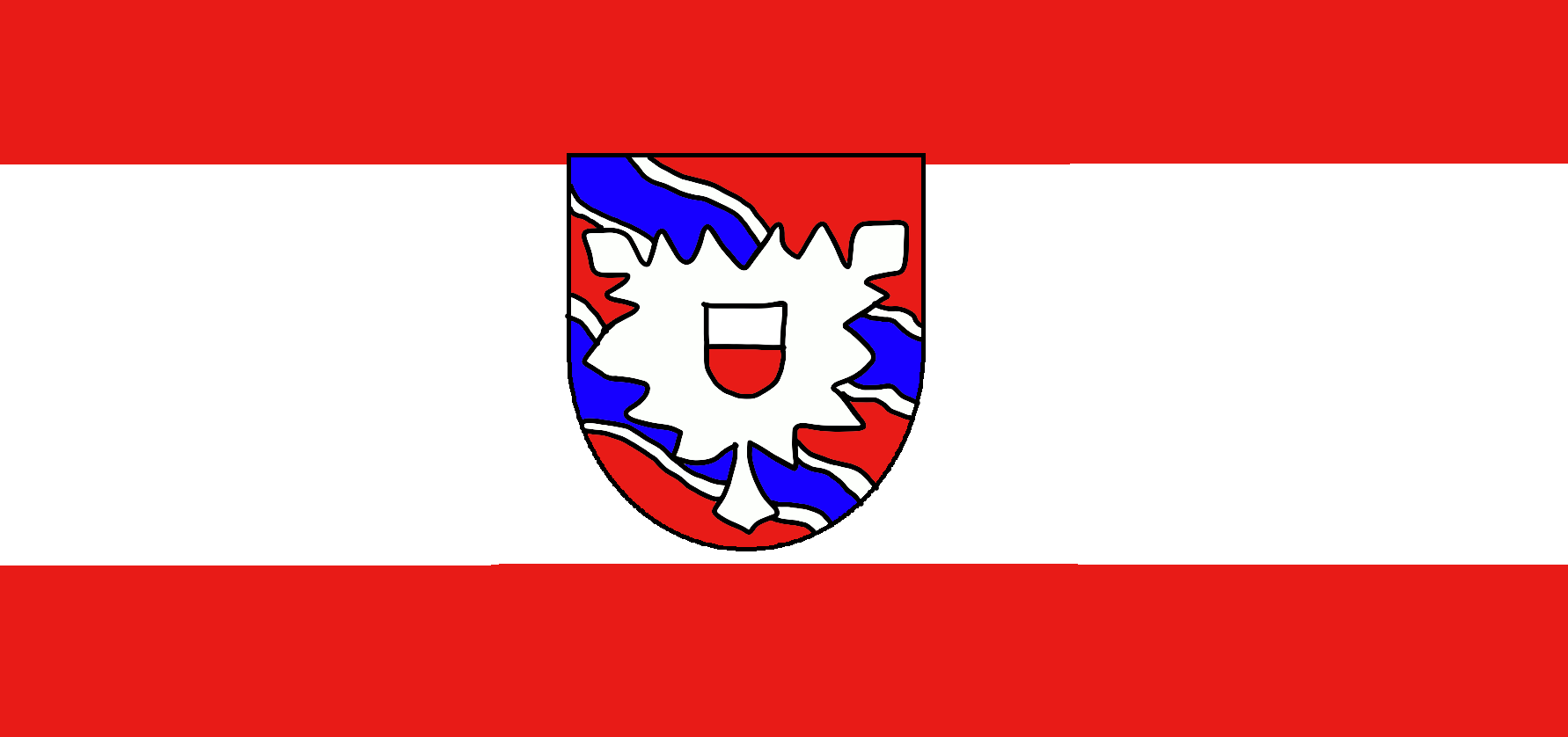
- Flag Coat of arms

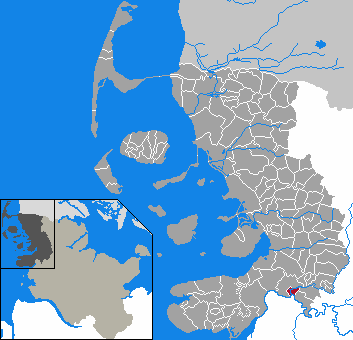
- Location of Friedrichstadt; Frederiksstad within Nordfriesland district
- Interactive map of Friedrichstadt; Frederiksstad
- Location within Germany Location within Schleswig-Holstein
- Coordinates: 54°22′N 9°04′E
- Country: Germany
- State: Schleswig-Holstein
- District: Nordfriesland

Government
  - Mayor: Peter Hofmann

Area
  - Total: 4.02 km^{2} (1.55 sq mi)
- Elevation: 6 m (20 ft)

Population (2025-12-31)
  - Total: 2,527
  - Density: 629/km^{2} (1,630/sq mi)
- Time zone: UTC+01:00 (CET)
  - Summer (DST): UTC+02:00 (CEST)
- Postal codes: 25840
- Dialling codes: 04881
- Vehicle registration: NF

Friedrichstadt (German: [ˈfʁiːdʁɪçˌʃtat]; Low German: Frieestadt; Danish: Frederiksstad; North Frisian: Fräärstää; Dutch: Frederikstad aan de Eider) is a town in the district of Nordfriesland, in Schleswig-Holstein, Germany. It is situated on the river Eider approx. 12 km (7 miles) south of Husum.

== History ==
The town was founded in 1621 by Dutch settlers. Duke Friedrich III of Holstein-Gottorp persuaded them to invest capital and knowledge in this region in turn for freedom of their Mennonite and Remonstrant religions (see: Arminianism) and opportunities to reclaim fen and marsh land in the vicinity of the town. One of them was Johannes Narssius. Dutch became an official language. The town was named after Duke Frederick.

By 1630, many Arminians had already returned to the Netherlands. Between 1633 and 1637 Frederick III sent an embassy to Tsar Michael I of Russia and to Shah Safi of Persia with a view to setting up Friedrichstadt as a European trade terminus. The delegation was led by the jurisconsult Philip Crusius and the merchant Otto Bruggemann or Brugman; their secretary, the scholar Adam Olearius, later wrote a book documenting the mission. The aim of creating a regular trading route that did not need to pass around Africa was not achieved, the delegation proved fruitless and the town did not become as successful as anticipated.

Beside the Remonstrants and Mennonites, other faith communities which settled in the town included Unitarians, Quakers, Catholics and Jews.

== Notable people ==
=== Sons and daughters of the city ===
- Johannes Thedens (1680–1748), Governor-general of the Dutch East Indies 1741/1743.
- Benjamin Calau (1724–1785), visual artist who used who used an encaustic technique.
- Eduard Alberti (1827–1898), literary historian and philosopher.
- Wilhelm Mannhardt (1831–1880), scholar and folklorist
- William Thordsen (1879–1932), US Navy Medal of Honor recipient
- Norbert Masur (1901–1971), subcontractor of the Jewish World Congress

=== Connected to Friedrichstadt ===
- Wolfgang Marcus Gualtherus, (ca.1580-1642 in Friedrichstadt), rector in Kampen and, city secretary in Friedrichstadt.
- Jürgen Ovens (1623–1678), Rembrandt pupil and court painter of the dukes of Schleswig-Holstein-Gottorf, lived here and is buried in St. Christophorus Church
- Louis Philippe I (1773–1850) lived a few months in the flight from the French Revolution, worked under a blanket as a home teacher.
- Hjalmar Schacht (1877–1970), German politician, banker, Reichsbank president and Reichswirtschaftsminister, his grandparents lived here

== Images ==
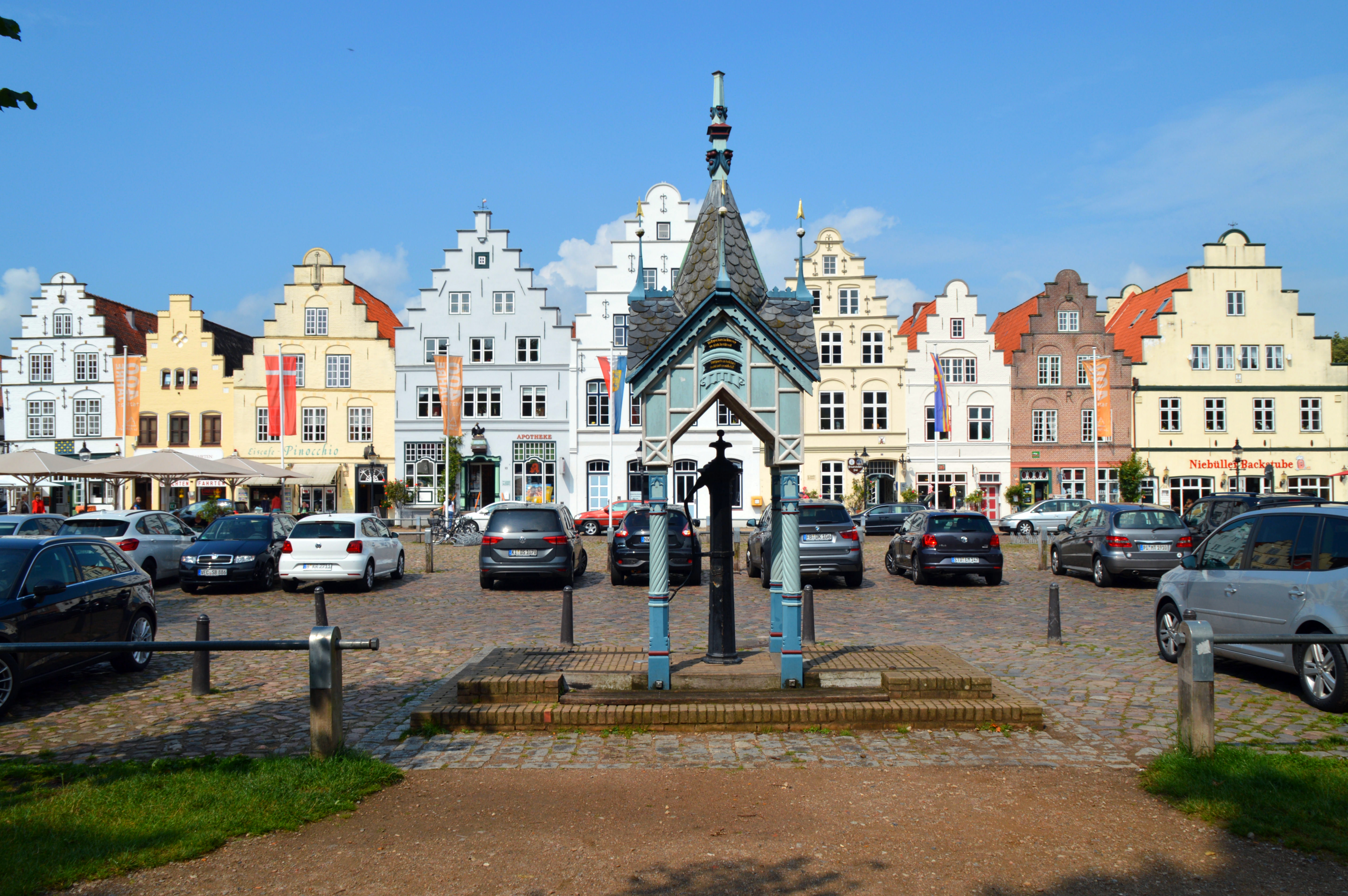
Waterpump from 1879

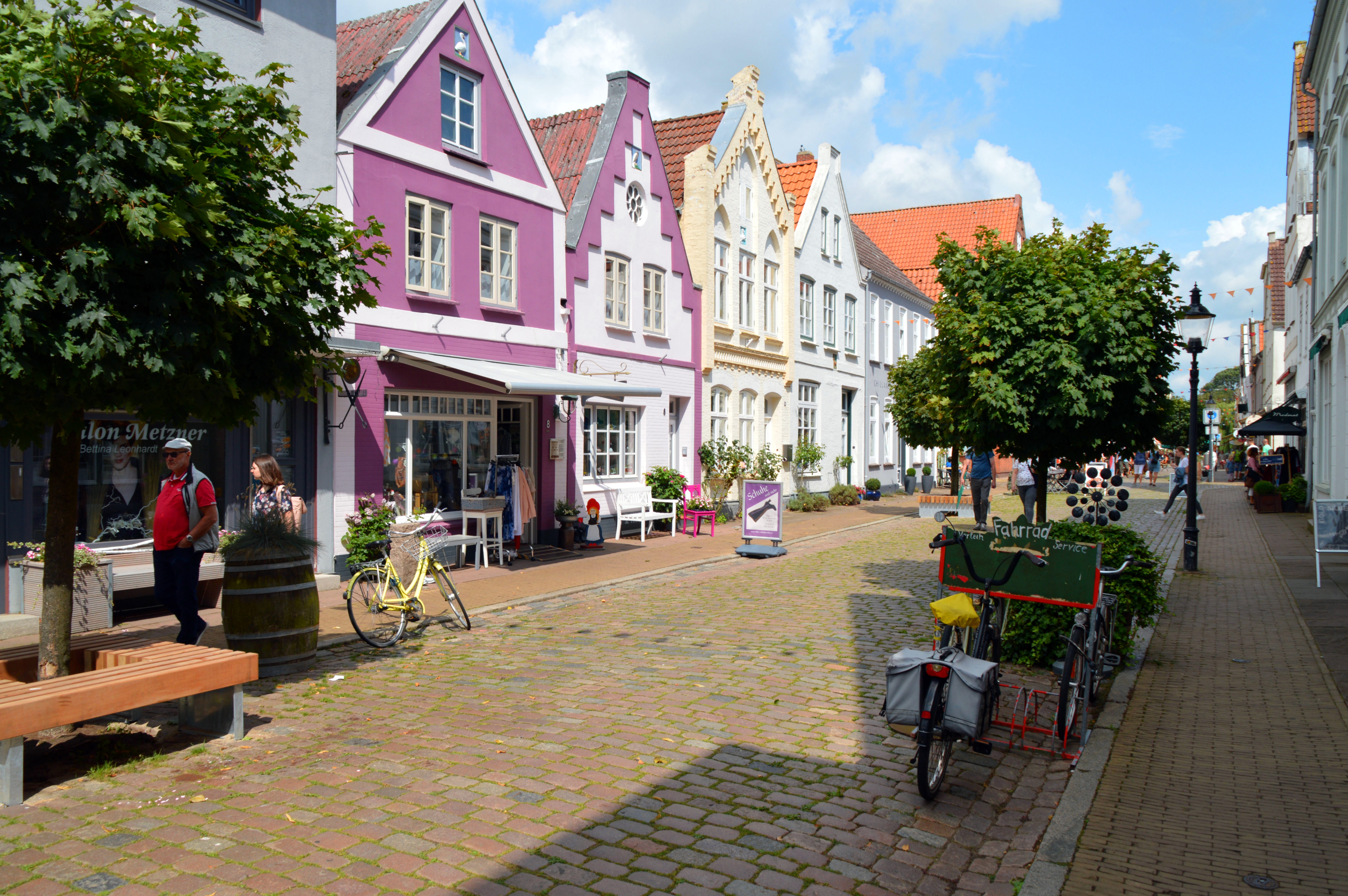
Streetview with Dutch architecture

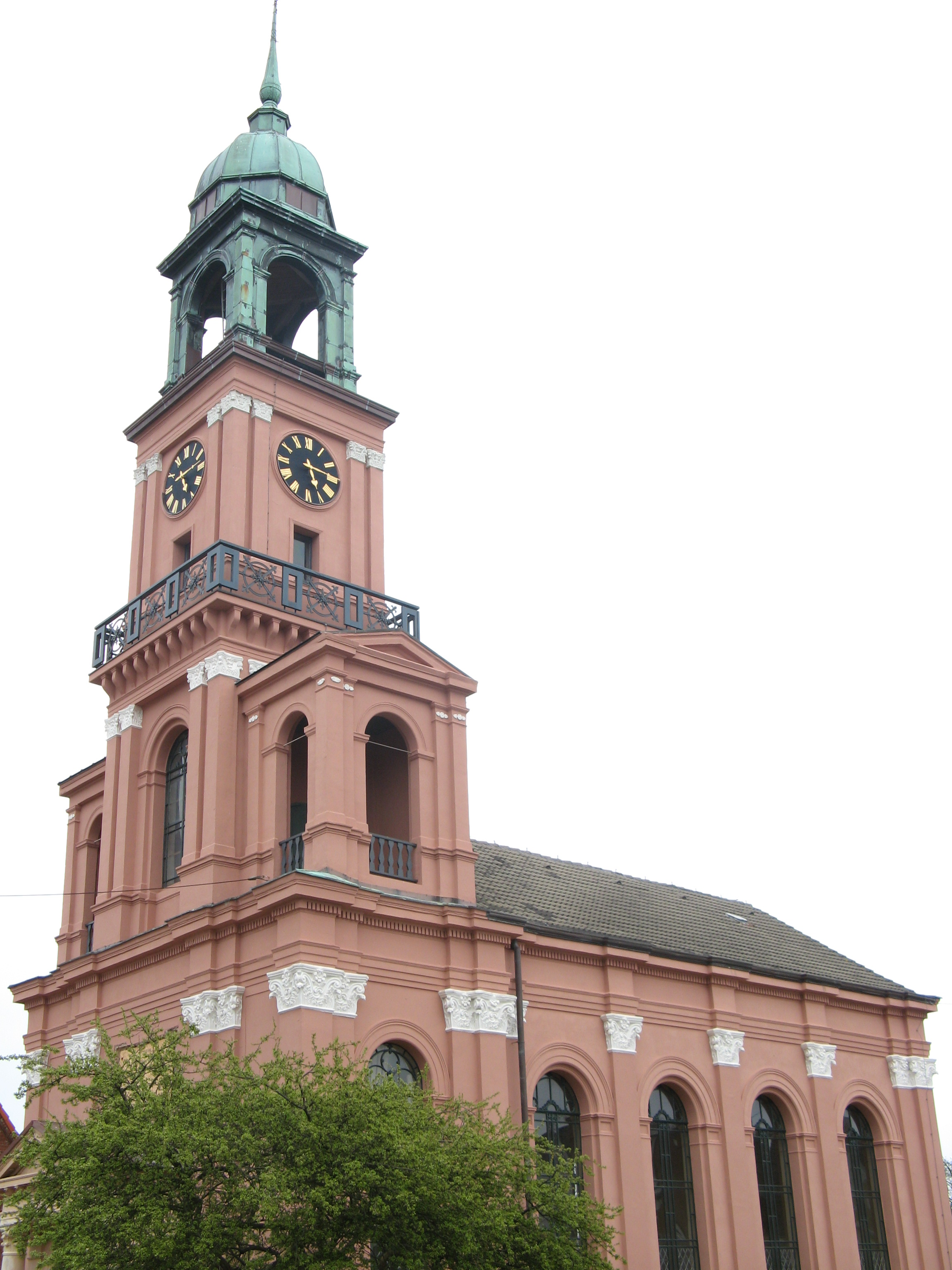
Remonstrant church

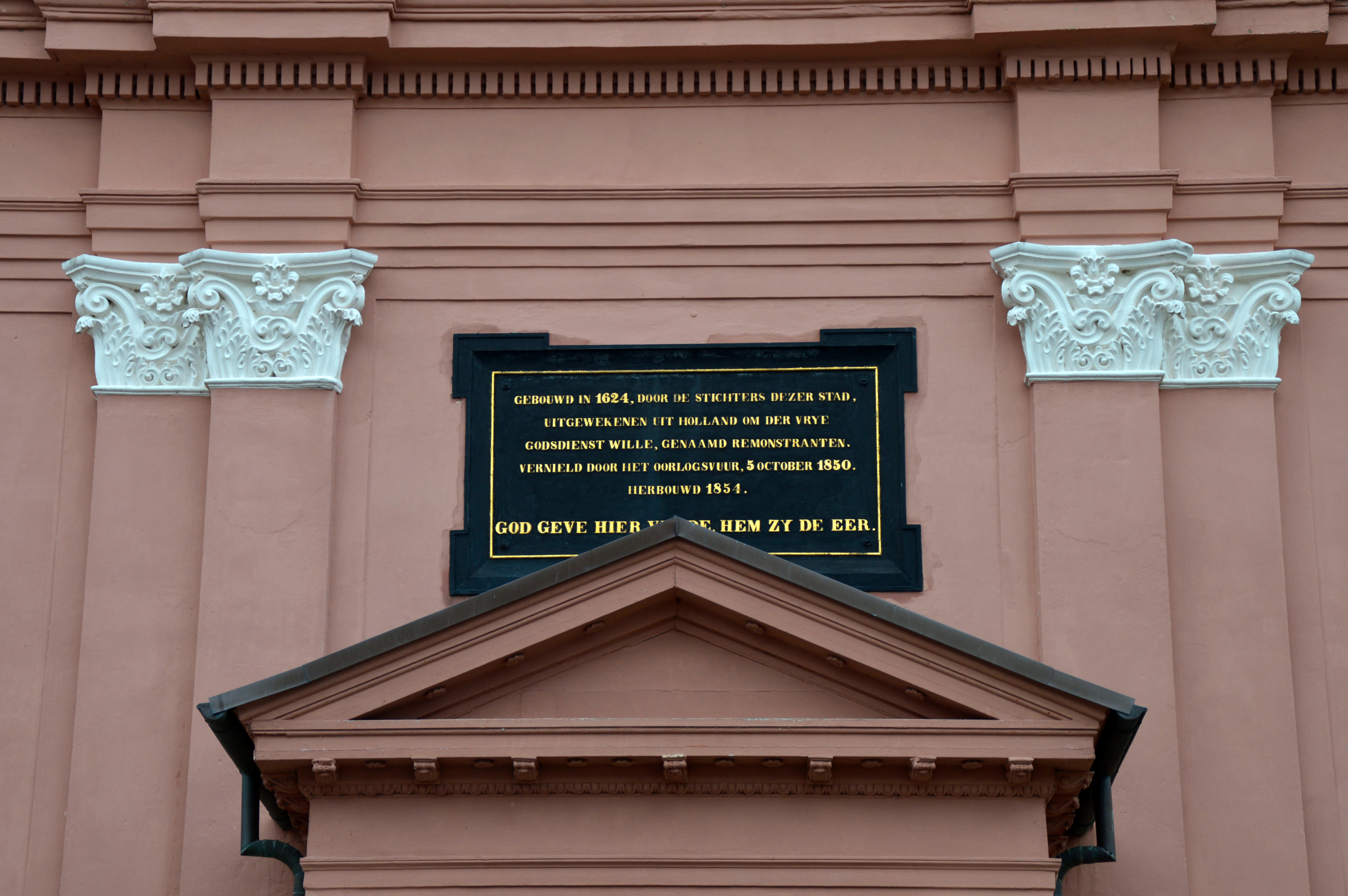
Detail Remonstrant church

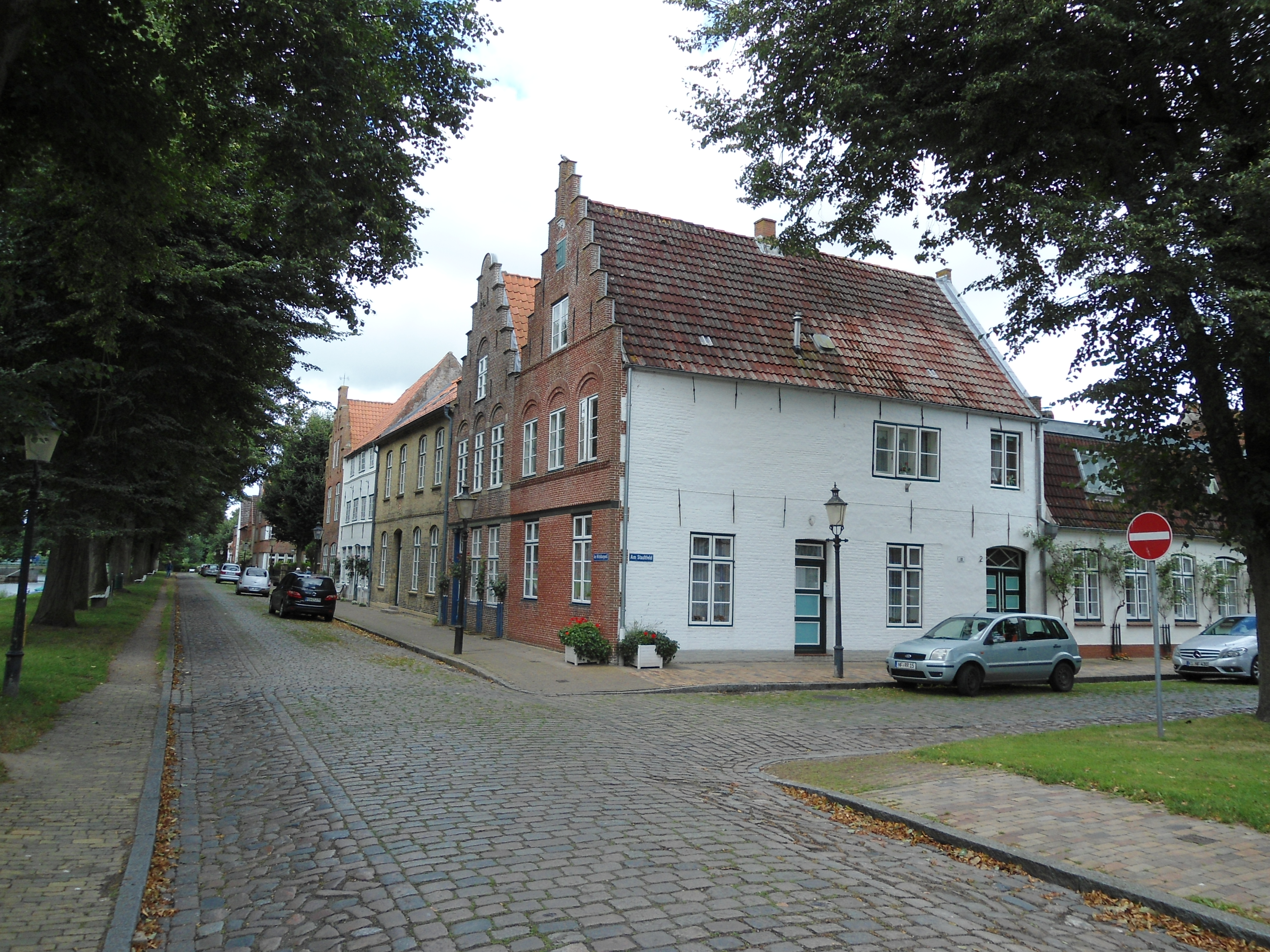
Streetview Friedrichstadt

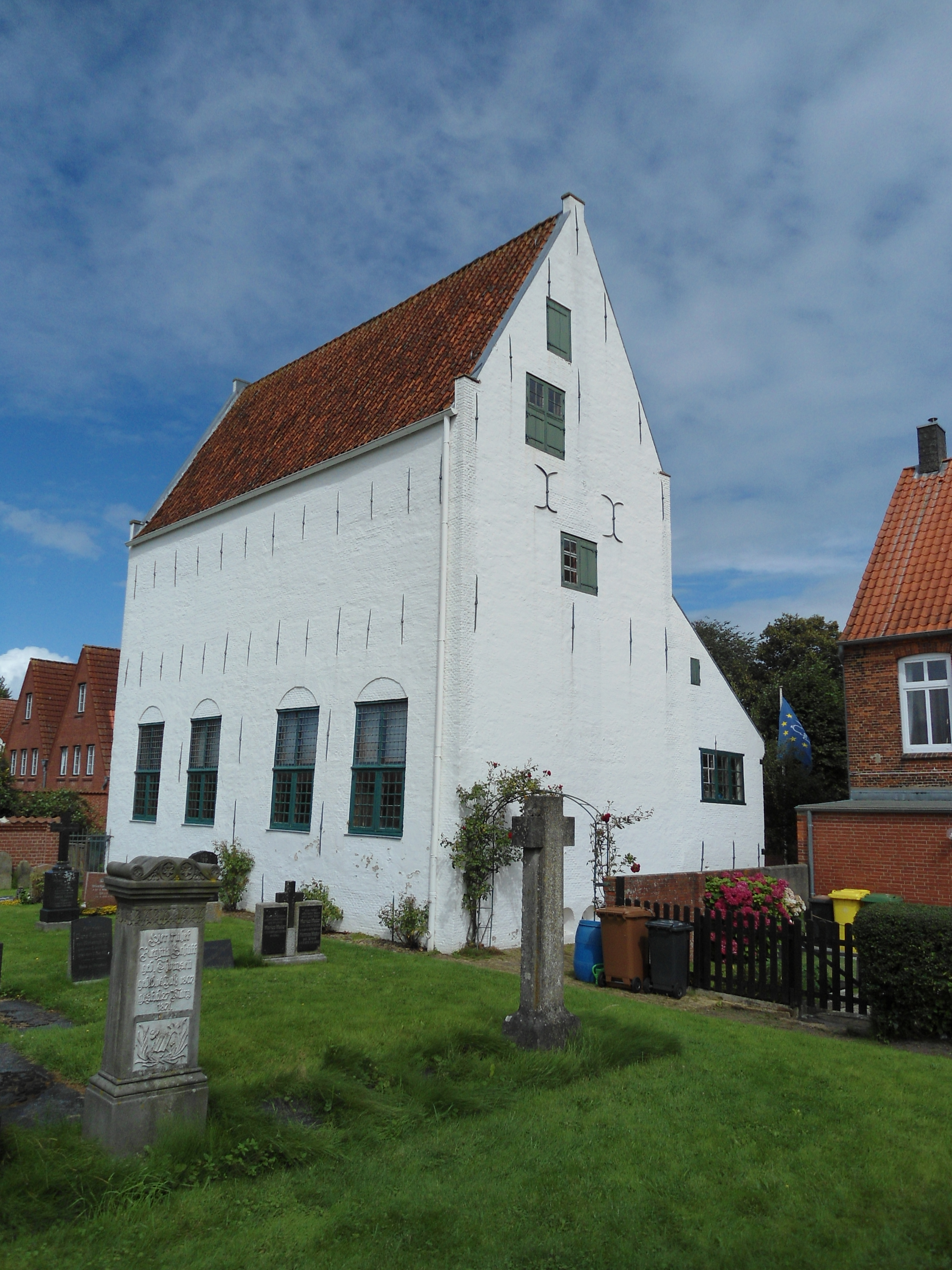
Mennonites church Friedrichstadt

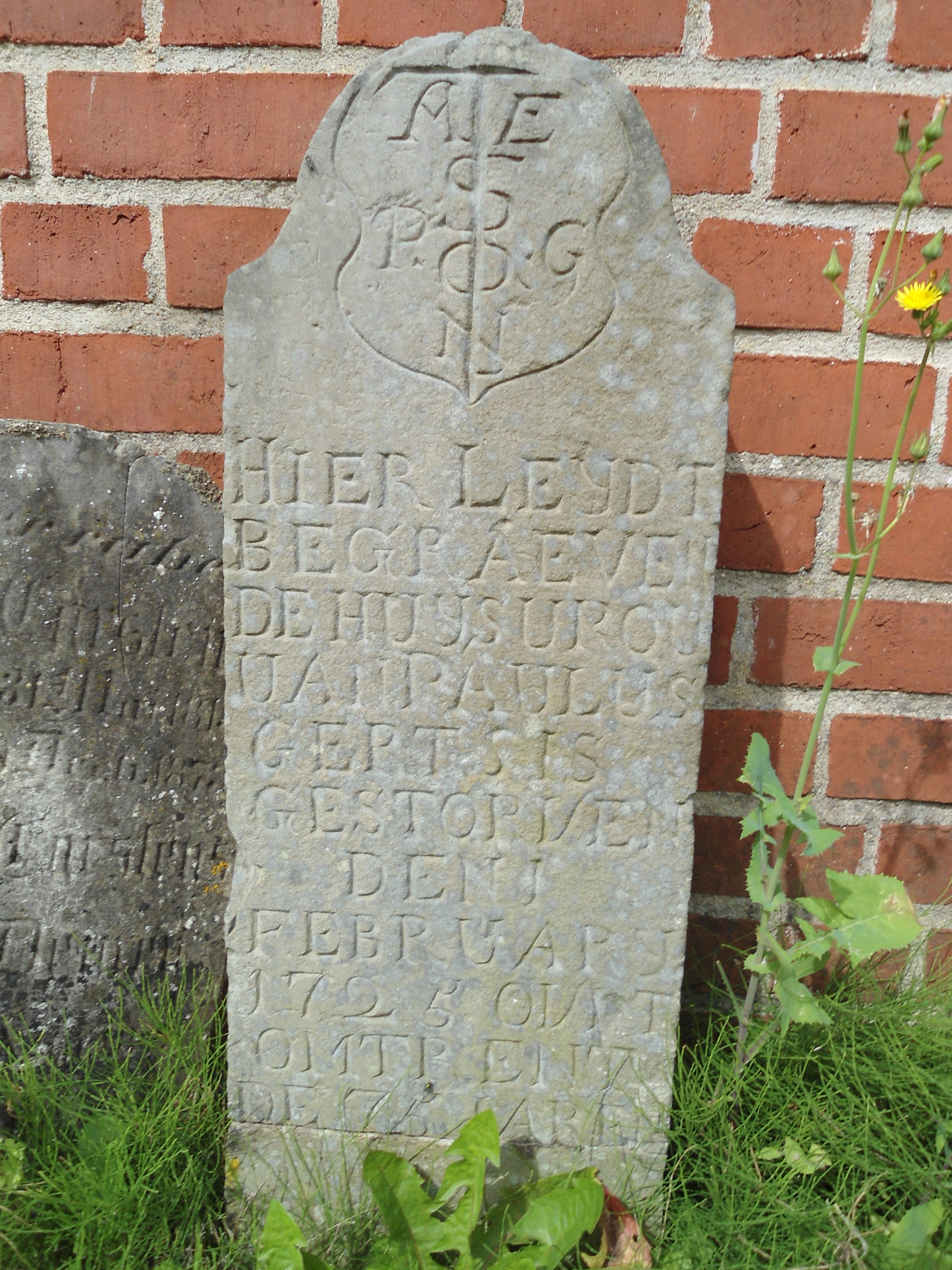
Dutch gravestone 1725 in the Mennonite cemetery

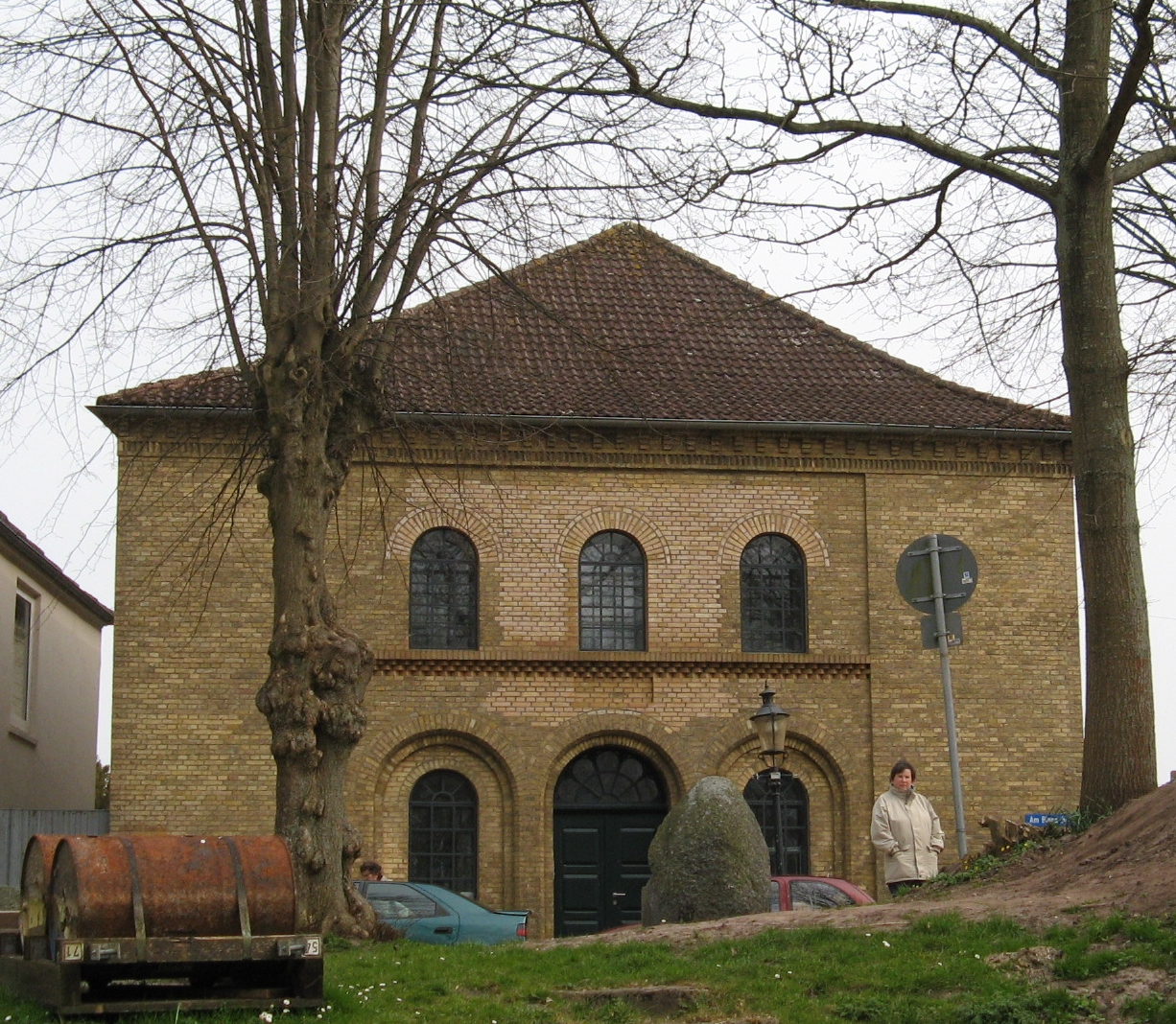
Former synagogue

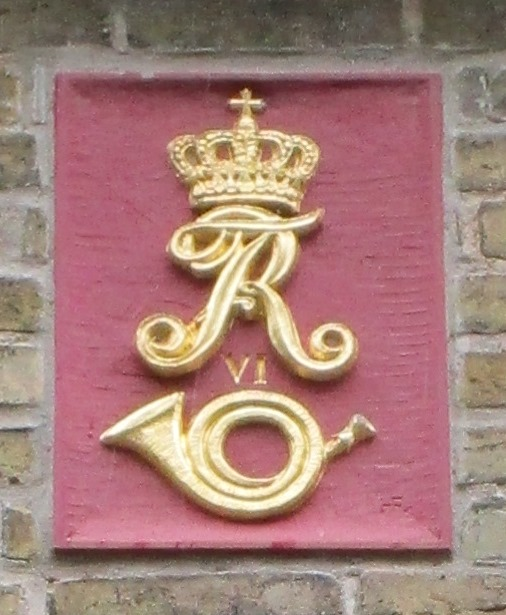
House brand with the monogram of the Danish king

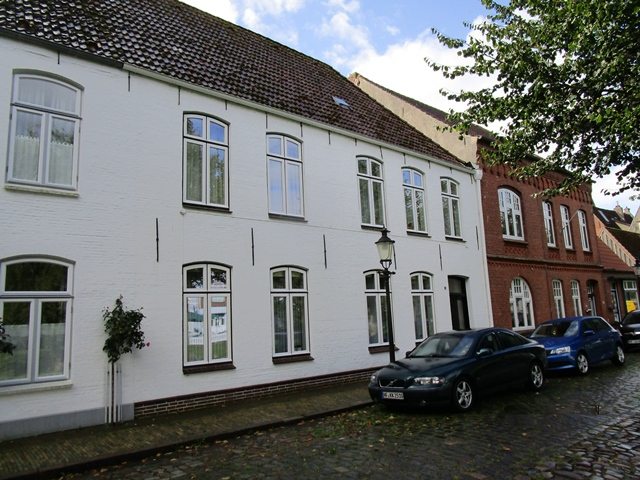
Building used by the Unitarians
