= Wolfgang Marcus Gualtherus =

Wolfgang Marcus Gualtherus, Latinized from Walther (c. 1580, in Weinheim – buried April 22, 1642, in Friedrichstadt ) was rector in Kampen and, as a religious refugee, city secretary in Friedrichstadt.

== Life ==
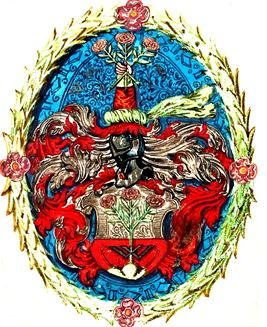
Coat of arms of Wolfgang Marcus Gualtherus from Weinheim, drawing in his family book (1600)

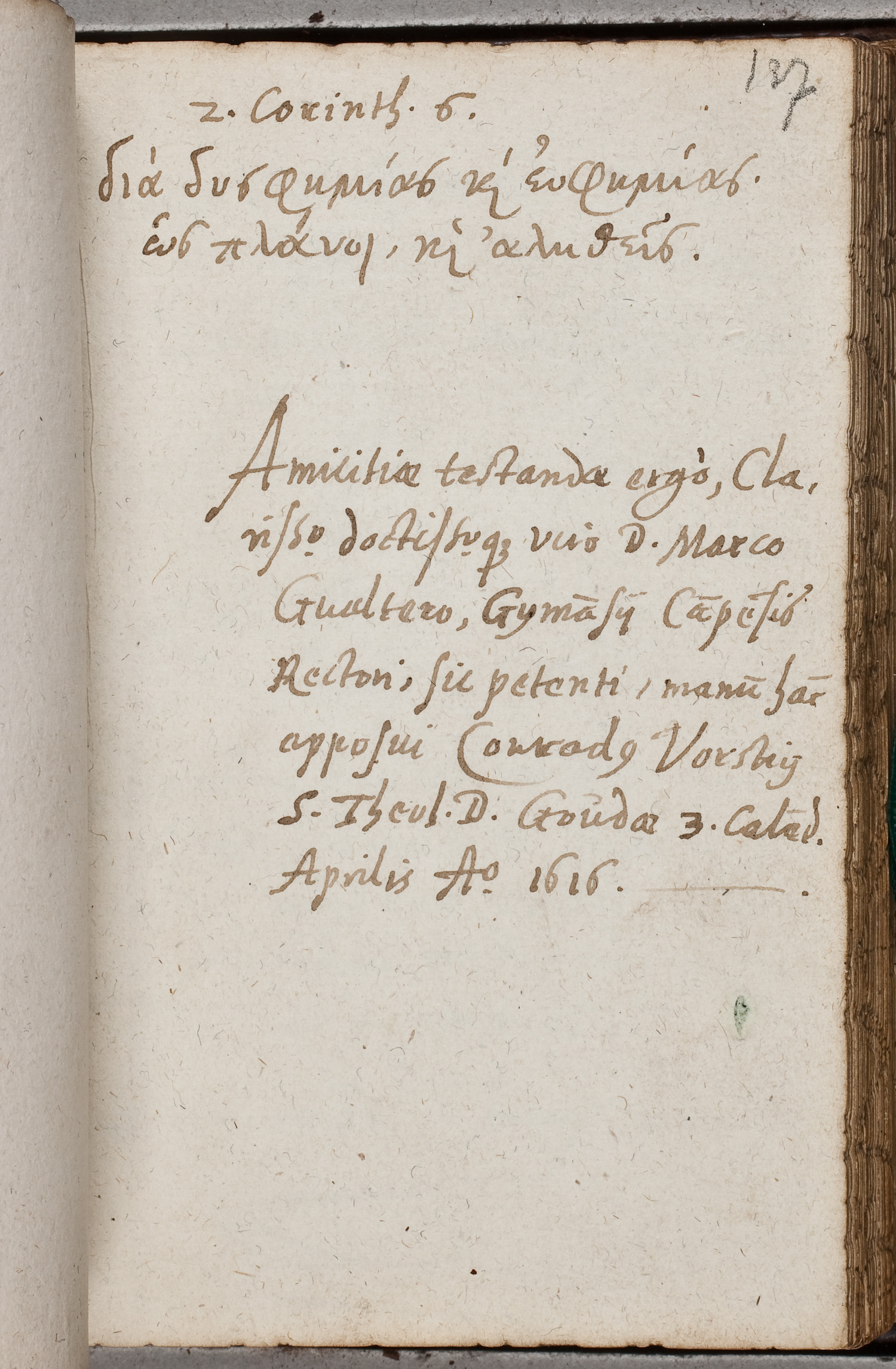
Entry of Konrad von der Vorst in the Gualtherus family book. Vorst died in 1622 while emigrating to Tönning.

Wolfgang Marcus Gualtherus was a son of Franciscus Walter. His mother's name is not known. On April 20, 1593, he was accepted among the scholarship holders of the Gymnasium in Hornbach. Since the end of 1598 he can be proven in Heidelberg. On December 11, 1599 he received his doctorate from the University of Heidelberg to become a baccalaureate. According to the entries in his family book he studied at the University of Heidelberg until the fall of 1602, presumably theology. In 1604 he lived in Kampen for the first time. On October 7, 1604 he received a position as vice principal in the latin school. In 1606 he was promoted to rector of the school.

In April 1608, in Vollenhove, Gualtherus married Aeltjen (Aelke, Aleijda) Wolfsen (baptized 8 August 1583 in Zwolle), who was alive in 1639. She was a daughter of Rentmeister Johan Wolfsen and his wife Helena Vos. The Gualtherus couple had six children. Due to the high reputation of the father of the family, the Kampen magistrate granted the entire family citizenship in 1617.

As a Remonstrant, Gualtherus conducted a written debate about predestination with his fellow student Johannes Urbanus, among others. The community of Kampen, which at the time was considered a stronghold of the Remonstrants, elected him community elder in 1617. As such, he attended the provincial synod in Vollenhove in 1618. After the counter-remonstrants had prevailed at the Dordrecht synod, Gualtherus had to give up his church offices in August 1619. At the end of the same year, against the will of the residents, he was also dismissed as rector of the school. He then continued to live in Kampen, but was taken prisoner in 1621. The reason for this was an overthrow of the Kampens government due to probably correct accusations, secret contacts to the banned Remonstrant leaders Johannes Wtenbogaert, Conrad Vorstius and Simon Episcopius to have entertained. Because of alleged blasphemy Gualtherus had to leave the city.

Gualtherus then moved to Elburg. The Kamper magistrate continued to put pressure on him, but could not prevent him from living there in seclusion for a long time. He tried unsuccessfully to get his papers confiscated in Kampen and was living in Hoorn in June 1622. A short time later he moved to Friedrichstadt, which had been founded in 1621 as a free town, especially for Remonstrants. At the funeral of Conrad Vorstius, who, like him, had emigrated to the Duchy of Schleswig-Holstein-Gottorf after the Dordrecht Synod, he delivered the eulogy. The Remonstrant Church in Friedrichstadt was built over his grave.

Gualtherus was appointed rector of the probably not large Latin school in Friedrichstadt and received his first salary on July 29, 1624. He represented a consortium that wanted to dyke a piece of foreland on the island of Nordstrand. Duke Friedrich III. gave Gualtherus the area for a higher sum of money. However, the project was never realized. On April 4, 1625, Gualtherus became city and court secretary of Friedrichstadt. In addition, he continued to direct the Latin school. On July 23, 1628, he also took over the postmaster's office and dispatched the messengers to Hamburg.

In June 1631 a magistrate came into force in Friedrichstadt. Gualtherus was then to draw up a draft of a town charter. He should combine Dutch and domestic law. The reason for this were concessions to the largely Dutch settlers that the law they were familiar with was applied in Friedrichstadt. In October 1631, Gualtherus presented a first version in High German, which the ducal chancellery was to revise and confirm. The city charter drafted by Gualtherus became effective on March 22, 1633 and appeared in print in 1635 in a Dutch version. It was the largest codificationa municipal law of the duchies with the complete civil, commercial, criminal and procedural law and the municipal constitutional and administrative law. In comparison to numerous legal texts of this time, in which the author is not named, the work known by Gualtherus offers the possibility to follow his work steps in detail based on the source information. He used the municipal rights of Amsterdam, Leiden, Lübeck, Hamburg and Husum, the case law of the provisional government of Friedrichstadt, literature of Roman law and numerous other legal literature.

Gualtherus' son Johannes succeeded his father in office in 1642 and died in 1652.

== Works ==
- Album Amicorum, Manuskript, mit Einträgen aus den Jahren 1593–1624 und 1649. Das Stammbuch, umfassend 194 Einträge mit 23 farbigen Wappenzeichnungen, gelangte im Jahr 1937 durch Ankauf aus dem Antiquariatshandel in die Königliche Bibliothek der Niederlande, Signatur 133 L 8
- De Vita Et Obitu Reverendi, Clarissimi & doctissimi viri, Dn. Conradi Vorstii SS. Theologiae Doctoris, qui pie & placide expiravit Tonningae, 29 Septemb: Anni 1622. & postridie Calend. Octobr. honorifice in nova Holsatiae Fridericopoli terrae mandatus est. 1624
- Policy Gerichts-Ordeninghe Ende Stadts-recht: Het welcke Van Godes genaden, wy Frederick, Erve tot Norwegen, Hertogh tot Sleyswigh, Holsteyn, Stormarn ende der Ditmarschen, Grave tot Oldenborgh ende Delmenhorst, &c. Onse Stadt Fredericks-Stadt, na rijpe overweginge van saecken in genaden gegeven, ende geconfirmeert hebben; [Ghegeven op onser Slot Gottorp, den 20. Martii: Anno 1633.] 1635. Digitalisat der Herzog August Bibliothek

== See also ==
- Willi Schnoor, Dieter Lohmeier: Gualtherus, Marcus. In: Schleswig-holsteinisches biographisches Lexikon. Band 5. Wachholtz, Neumünster 1979, ISBN 3-529-02645-X, S. 100–102.
