= William Warmington =

William Warmington (c. 1556 – 1627 or later) was an English Roman Catholic priest, who sided with James I of England in the allegiance oath controversy.

== Life ==
Born in Dorset about 1556, he matriculated at Hart Hall, Oxford, on 20 December 1577. The Principal, Philip Randall, was a Catholic sympathiser, and under his influence Warmington openly espoused Catholicism. He left Oxford, and studied philosophy and theology at Douai.

After a brief visit to England in 1579, he was ordained sub-deacon at Douai on 24 February 1580, deacon on 19 March, and priest on 25 May. He was again sent to England on 31 January 1581, was apprehended, and in February 1585 transported to Normandy with threats of more severe treatment if he returned. He was appointed chaplain to Cardinal William Allen. After Allen's death in 1594 he returned to England as an oblate of the Congregation of St. Ambrose.

On 24 March 1608, he was apprehended by two pursuivants, and imprisoned in The Clink in Southwark. There he decided to take the oath of allegiance to James I. Set at liberty on swearing, Warmington found himself deserted by former friends, and petitioned James I for an allowance. By the king's direction he was placed in the household of Thomas Bilson, bishop of Winchester.

He survived at least to 1627, remained a Catholic, and was again imprisoned in The Clink.

== Works ==
To justify himself he published his reasons in 1612 under the title, A Moderate Defence of the Oath of Allegiance, wherein the Author proveth the said Oath to be most Lawful, notwithstanding the Pope's Breves (London). With this discourse he published The Oration of Pope Sixtus V in the Consistory of Rome, upon the Murther of King Henry 3, the French King, by a Fryer, and Strange Reports, or News from Rome.
